= Mugumoini =

Part of Kibera, Nairobi, Kenya

Mugumoini is a part of Kibera slum in Nairobi. A Mugumoini Primary School exists. It is part of Langata Constituency. Many residents are Luhyas. Mugumoini has a PCEA church. Other parts of Kibera include Laini Saba, Lindi, Makina, Kianda, Gatwekera, Soweto East, Kisumu Ndogo, Makongeni, Kichinjio and Mashimoni.

== See also ==
- Kambi Muru
- Raila
- Shilanga
- Siranga
