= Sarang'ombe =

Neighborhood in Kibera, Nairobi, Kenya

Sarang'ombe is a part of Kibera in Nairobi. Some parts of Sarang'ombe ward include Ayany Estate. It is part of Kibra Constituency. An Ushirika Health Centre is in Sarang'ombe. Other parts of Kibera include Laini Saba, Lindi, Makina, Kianda, Gatwekera, Soweto East, Kichinjio, Kisumu Ndogo, Makongeni and Mashimoni.

== See also ==
- Raila
- Shilanga
- Siranga
