= Soweto West =

Soweto East is a part of major Kibera slum in Nairobi. A school KidStar Academy is in Soweto West. Other parts of Kibera include Soweto East, Laini Saba Lindi, Makina, Kianda, Mashimoni, Gatuikira, Kisumu Ndogo and Siranga.
