= Kambi Muru =

Kambi Muru is a part of Kibera slum in Nairobi. It borders to Mashimoni, Lindi, Kisumu Ndogo and Makina. Kambi Muru is the site of Kibera Academy. It is also a part of the area of Christ the King Catholic Church. Other parts of Kibera include Laini Saba, Lindi, Makina, Kianda, Gatwekera, Soweto East, Kichinjio, Kisumu Ndogo, Makongeni and Mashimoni.

== See also ==
- Raila
- Sarang'ombe
- Shilanga
- Siranga
