= Kichinjio =

Part of Kibera, Nairobi, Kenya

Kichinjio is a part of Kibera slum in Nairobi. Kichinjio has a New Adventure Secondary School and a Kicoshep Primary School. Furthermore, Kichinjio has a mosque. Other parts of Kibera include Laini Saba, Lindi, Makina, Kianda, Gatwekera, Soweto East, Kisumu Ndogo, Makongeni and Mashimoni.

== See also ==
- Kambi Muru
- Raila
- Sarang'ombe
- Shilanga
- Siranga
