= List of slums in Kenya =

Slums in Nairobi

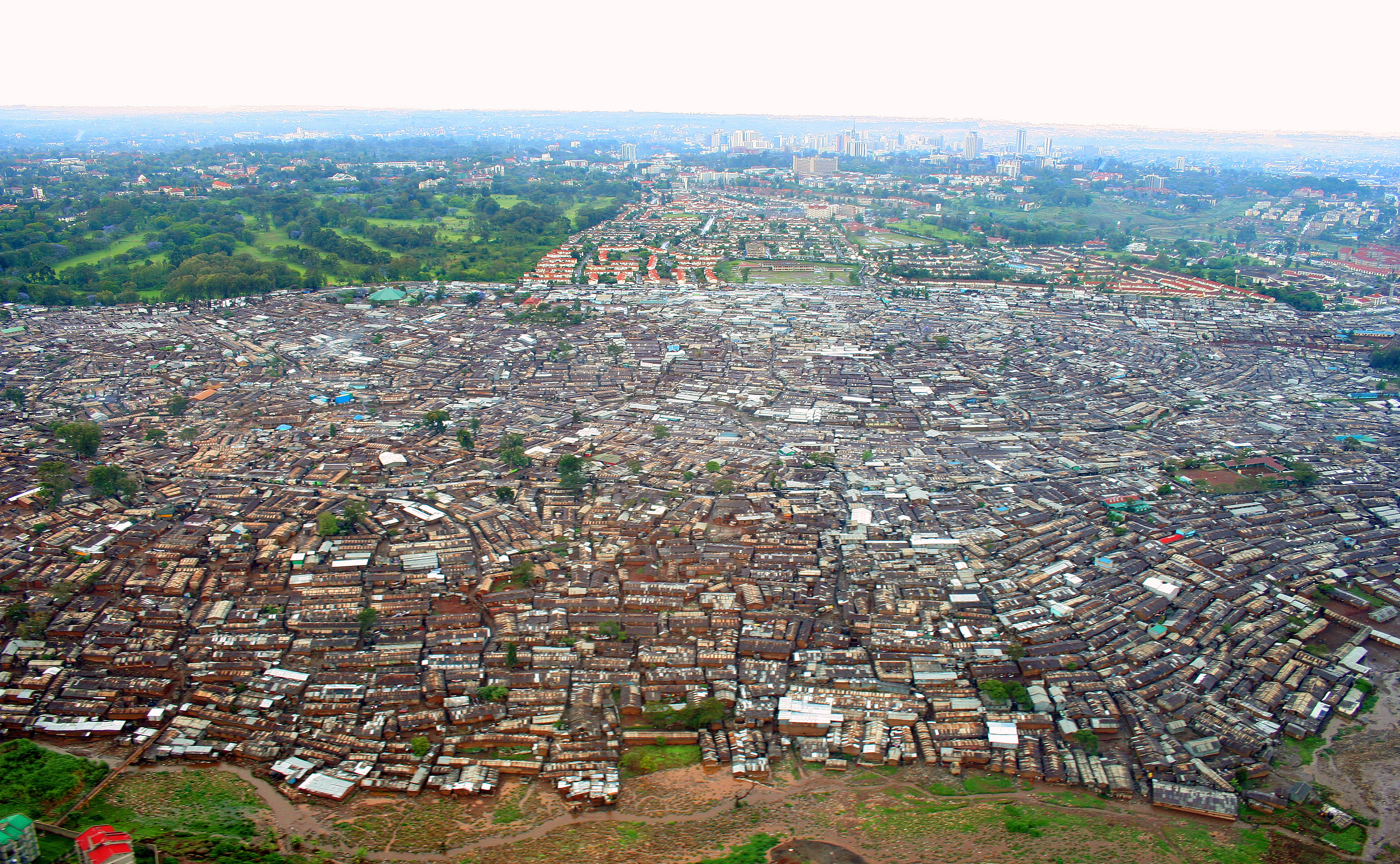
An aerial view of Kibera

There are many slums in Kenya, for example in the cities of Nairobi and Mombasa. According to UN DESA (United Nations Department of Economic and Social Affairs), 55 per cent of Kenya's urban population were slum inhabitants in 2007. In 2019, around two million inhabitants of Nairobi lived in informal settlements.

== Nairobi ==
- Dandora
- Deep Sea
- Huruma
- Kangemi
- Kariobangi
- Kawangware
- Kiambiu
- Kiandutu
- Kibera (including villages of Laini Saba, Lindi and Soweto East)
- Korogocho
- Kware
- Majengo
- Mathare (including settlements of Bondeni, Mathare 4A and Mathare 4B)
- Matopeni
- Mukuru kwa Njenga

== Mombasa ==
- Magongo
- Majengo
- Mzambarauni
- Bangladesh
- Likoni
- Maweni
- Junda
- Kambi Kikuyu
- Kisumu Ndogo

== See also ==
- Squatting in Kenya
