= Raila =

Part of Kibera slum in Nairobi

Raila is a part of Kibera slum in Nairobi, named after the former Prime Minister, the Late Raila Odinga. Other parts of Kibera include Laini Saba, Lindi, Makina, Kianda, Gatwekera, Soweto East, Kichinjio, Kisumu Ndogo, Makongeni and Mashimoni.

== See also ==
- Sarang'ombe
- Shilanga
- Siranga
