= Shilanga =

Nairobi's Kibera slum area

Shilanga is a part of Kibera slum in Nairobi. It has at least one church. It has a major Luo population. Other parts of Kibera include Laini Saba, Lindi, Makina, Kianda, Gatwekera, Soweto East, Kichinjio, Kisumu Ndogo, Makongeni and Mashimoni.

== See also ==
- Raila
- Sarang'ombe
- Siranga
