= Mukuru kwa Njenga =

Informal settlement in Nairobi

- Informal settlement
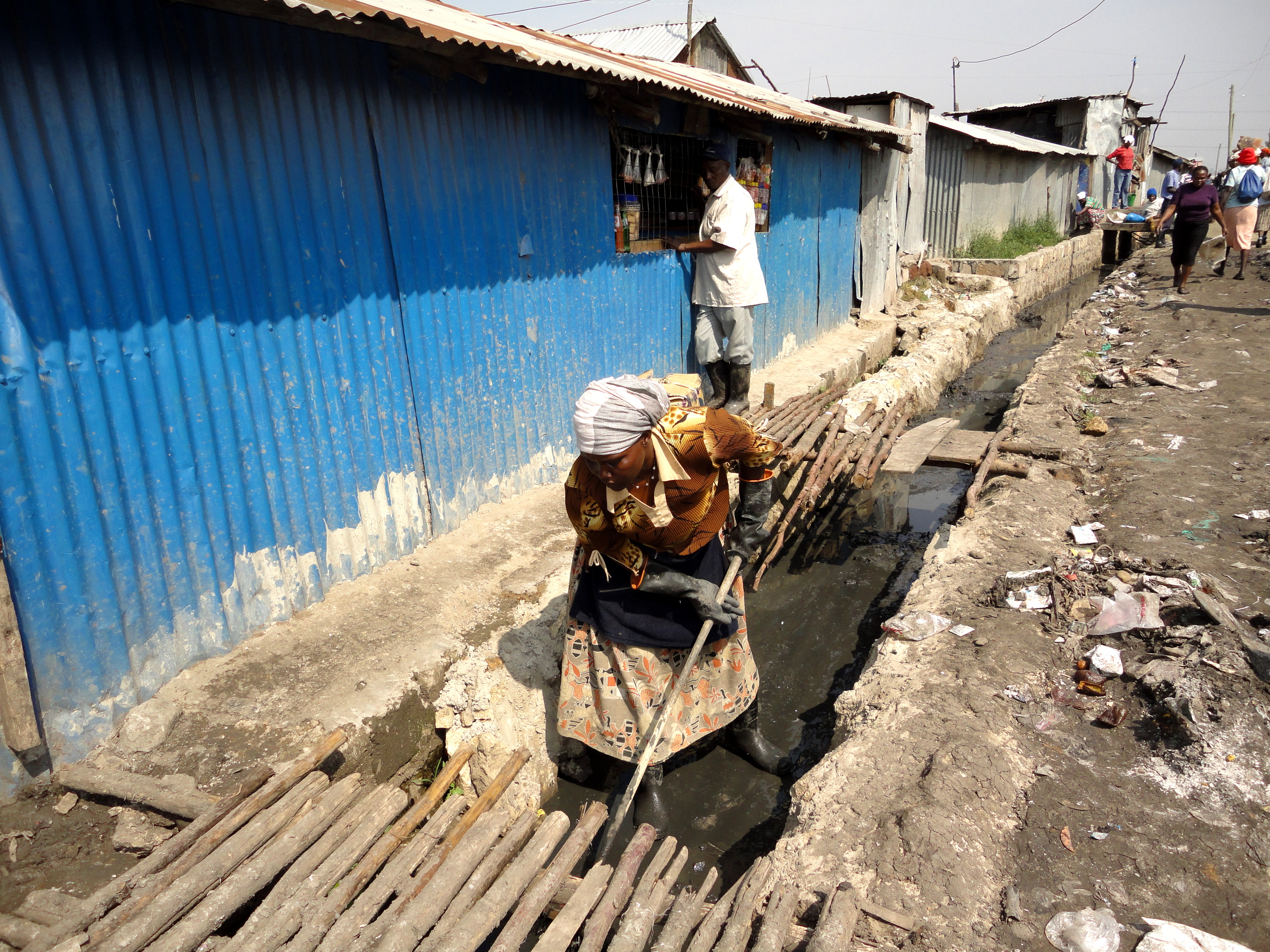
- An Oxfam funded drain cleaning project in Mukuru

- Location of Kwa Njenga in Kenya
- Coordinates: 1°18′17″S 36°53′6″E
- Country: Kenya
- County: Nairobi City
- Sub-county: Embakasi

Mukuru Kwa Njenga is an urban informal settlement or commonly a slum situated in Embakasi South constituency in the southern part of Nairobi, Kenya's capital. Kwa Njenga is among a cluster of villages making up Mukuru slums namely Mukuru kwa Reuben, Sinai, Paradise, Kwa Njenga, Jamaica, Kingstone, Mariguini, Fuata Nyayo and Kayaba.

The Mukuru slum consists of approximately 30 villages and is home to over 700,000 people.

At 2.7km², Mukuru is the largest (in terms of area) of the three large settlements in the city.

== Living conditions ==
94% of Mukuru dwellers are tenants in tiny iron sheet shacks with minimal infrastructure.In the slums, whole families live, in tiny one-roomed corrugated iron shacks, measuring approximately 3 m x 3 m. Very few homes have access to electricity and up to twenty families might share a communal water tap and toilet latrine.

== Details ==
There are two government schools in Mukuru Kwa Njenga, Kwa Njenga Primary School and Our Lady of Nazareth primary school which is partly sponsored by The Society of Mary (Latin: Societas Mariae, abbreviated S.M.) commonly known as the Marianist. The Medical Missionary of Mary and the newly commissioned, Our Lady Of Nazareth Health Center serves the health needs of the community. The Holy Ghost fathers have a big project and a Catholic church. Mukuru kwa Njenga has Anglican churches. Residents of the slum were in fear of a mass eviction of more than 50,000 persons in 2002.

In December of 2021, 40,000 people were displaced to make way for a road construction project

== Settlement profiling ==
The settlement profiling process include identifying the stakeholders, organizing of stakeholder forums for good representation, community mobilization and awareness creation, training of data collectors, and focus group discussions and interviews. The field research was conducted in six designated survey areas: Riara (SEPU), Mukuru Kwa Ruben, Mukuru Kwa Njenga, Viwandani, Kiandumu (Thika, Kiambu County), and selected wards in Nairobi County that do not predominantly feature slums. [This paragraph needs further clarification, but it appears to be drawn from projects of the College of Environmental Design, University of California-Berkeley, described in a series of blog posts.]

The Mukuru settlements have been designated as a Special Planning Area (SPA) due to their unique planning challenges and opportunities.

== Notable residents ==
Kenyan international footballer Patrick Oboya was born in Mukuru Kwa Njenga.

== See also ==
- Kibera
- Kawangware
- Kiambiu
- Korogocho
- Mathare
- Mathare Valley
