= Cannabis in Kenya =

- Location of Kenya (dark green)
- Medicinal: Illegal
- Recreational: Illegal

Cannabis, locally referred to as bhang, is illegal in Kenya under the Narcotic Drugs and Psychotropic Substances (Control) Act, 1994. Despite its prohibition, cannabis is cultivated and consumed in various regions of the country. The United Nations Office on Drugs and Crime (UNODC) has identified Kenya as one of the main producers of cannabis in East Africa, with cultivation reported in areas such as Mount Kenya and around Lake Victoria. In recent years, the subject of cannabis legalization has become part of national debate, particularly in relation to its potential medical and industrial uses.

== History ==
Locally referred to as bhang, banghi, or bangi, cannabis was banned in Kenya during the British colonial East Africa Protectorate under the Opium Ordinance, effective 1 January 1914. However, there have been recent campaigns that have called for its legalization. For instance, a former member of parliament for Kibra Constituency Ken Okoth advocated for its legalization on the basis of its medicinal values. In March 2019, the New York–based company GoIP Global Inc announced that it had obtained a license to grow cannabis, although their claim was denied by the Kenyan government.

== Cultivation ==
Cannabis hotbeds in Kenya include Mount Kenya and Lake Victoria, with cultivation also being observed in the coastal regions of the country. Notable amounts of cannabis are smuggled out of the country by foreign visitors. In 1999, Kenyan authorities reportedly seized 450 acres (180 ha) of cannabis; however, there are no official crop size or yield estimates.

== Consumption ==
Cannabis in Kenya is commonly available in joints that cost anywhere from 10 shillings to 100 shillings. According to a 1991 study, cannabis is the third most abused substance in Kenya, after alcohol and tobacco. According to a 2012 study by the National Agency for the Campaign Against Drug Abuse (NACADA), cannabis consumption was higher among men, the unemployed, and those residing in more urbanized areas, although consumption in rural areas was also increasing. The study also found that the most common users of cannabis in Kenya were aged 18 to 25 years. A section of traditional healers in Kisumu boil cannabis buds, then make a sponge bath for children suffering from measles.

== Legislation ==
Cannabis consumption is illegal in Kenya, with offenders facing up to eight years (formerly fifteen) of imprisonment.
