= Kibra Constituency =

Electoral constituency in Nairobi, Kenya

Kibra
- constituency for the Parliament of Kenya
- Kibra Constituency within Nairobi City County

- Nairobi City County within Kenya
- County: Nairobi City
- Population: 185,777
- Area: 12 km^{2} (4.6 sq mi)

Current constituency
- Created: 2013
- Number of members: One
- Party: ODM
- Member: Peter Orero
- Created from: Dagoretti & Lang'ata
- Wards: 5

Kibra Constituency is an electoral constituency in Nairobi, one of 17 constituencies in the county, and has an area of 12.1 km^{2}. It is located to the southwest of the City of Nairobi, and includes most of the Kibera slum and adjoining estates. The constituency was created prior to the 2013 general election.

Kibra is a Nubian word meaning 'forest' or 'jungle'. The Nubians have lived in what is now Kibra since the end of the Second World War, when they were allocated land by the British colonial government.

The entire constituency is within Nairobi City County. It was part of Lang'ata and Dagoretti constituencies until prior to the 2013 general elections, when it was designated a separate area by the Independent Electoral and Boundaries Commission. It is bordered by Lang'ata Constituency to the south and west, Dagoretti North Constituency to the north, Dagoretti South Constituency to the northwest and Starehe Constituency to the east.

== Members of Parliament ==
Elections	Member of Parliament	Party	Notes
Kibra Constituency created from Dagoretti and Lang'ata
2013	Ken Okoth	ODM	
2019	Benard Otieno Okoth	ODM	By-election. Succeeded his late brother Ken Okoth after his death in July 2019.
2022	Peter Orero	ODM	

== Wards ==
The constituency is made up of five wards, each of which elects a representative to the Nairobi County Assembly.

Ward	Area (km^{2})	Population
Sarang'ombe	0.4	28,182
Woodley/Kenyatta Golf Course	9.5	35,355
Makina	0.7	25,242
Laini Saba	0.4	29,000
Lindi	0.5	35,158
Total	12.1	178,284

== Kibra Sub-county ==
The Sub-county shares the same boundaries with the constituency. The sub-county is Deputy County Commissioner, working under the Ministry of Interior.
