= Editar Adhiambo Ochieng =

Kenyan women's rights activist

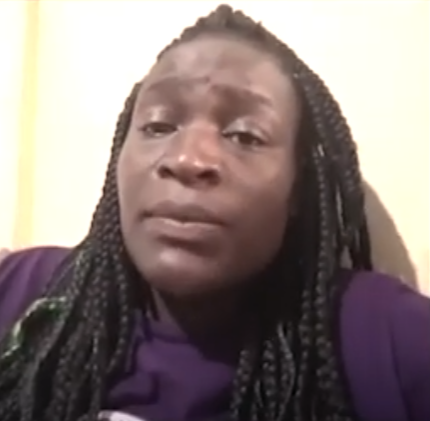
- In a UNOHCHR video in 2021
- Born: Kibera, Nairobi, Kenya
- Citizenship: Kenyan
- Occupations: Activist, feminist
- Organization(s): Feminist for Peace, Rights and Justice Centre
- Known for: Advocacy for women’s rights and support for survivors of sexual violence
- Political party: Ukweli Party
- Awards: Wangari Maathai Award (2020)

Editar Adhiambo Ochieng is a Kenyan activist and feminist who advocates for women's rights and supports survivors of sexual violence. In 2020, Ochieng became the first winner of the Wangari Maathai Award in Kenya for her contribution to curb the spread of COVID-19 pandemic in the Kibera slum.

== Personal life ==
Ochieng was born and raised in Kibera, one of the largest slums in Nairobi. At the age of six, she was raped, and at 16 years old, Ochieng was gang-raped after which her attackers publicly bragged about their crime. Ochieng refers to these personal experiences as examples of the normalized sexual violence against women and highlights the strength of women strength in enduring such crimes. Ochieng states that this obsolete mindset serves as the driving force for her activism.

== Career ==
Ochieng founded the Feminist for Peace, Rights and Justice Centre in Kibera. She is an intersectional feminist. Her centre aims to build leadership among young women, serving as a multi-generational organizing and networking platform. Ochieng encourages women to speak their stories and raise awareness to showcase the commonality of these experiences. The centre she runs serves as a support network for vulnerable women, such as those leaving abusive relationships. According to the government of Kenya, 45% of women and girls ages 15–49 have experienced violence. Many cases go unreported, and few receive medical care or justice.

Ochieng's work addresses a range of issues faced by women in the community. She provides sanitary products to vulnerable women, supports the implementation of United Nations Security Council Resolution 1325 as a way to include women in peace and security plans, and educates women on their constitutional rights. She is also a Toolkit Organiser with Peace Brigades International Kenya, collaborating with other Nairobi women human rights defenders (WHRD). She was among 56+ people arrested during a march on 7 July 2020 against police brutality, as over 100 people had been killed by Kenyan police up to that point in 2020.

=== COVID-19 pandemic ===
During the COVID-19 pandemic, Ochieng coordinated door-to-door services, food donations, and reusable masks for sexual violence survivors and vulnerable women in the community, as well as regularly informing locals about the pandemic. To prioritise food and relief, Ochieng mapped out the most vulnerable areas of the settlement. She is also responsible for the creation of a 'Feminist Library', which seeks to educate children who are unable to attend school due to the health crisis.

Ochieng was a panelist during the annual discussion on the human rights of women held by the UN Human Rights Council, which was centered around the theme of COVID-19 and women's rights.

Ochieng unsuccessfully vied for a parliamentary seat in the Kibra Constituency on the Ukweli party's ticket during the by-election of 7 November 2019, garnering 59 votes out of a total of 41,984 cast. This was after she qualified in primaries and her name was published in the competitive list of politicians who participated in the by-election that was held in 2019 November.

=== Awards ===
In 2020, Ochieng's contributions in Kibera during the COVID-19 pandemic were recognised when she won the Wangari Maathai Award, making her the first recipient of the award.
