= Woodley, Nairobi =

Residential neighbourhood in Nairobi, Kenya

Woodley
- Location of Woodley in Kenya
- Coordinates: 1°18′10″S 36°46′53″E
- Country: Kenya
- County: Nairobi City
- Sub-county: Kibra

Woodley is a residential neighbourhood in the city of Nairobi. It is approximately 4.4 kilometres (2.7 mi) west of the central business district. It generally a low-density suburb that lies north of Africa's largest slum, Kibera. Woodley Estate was completed in 1950 and named after the then mayor of Nairobi, Sir Richard Woodley.

== Location ==
Woodley Estate is located approximately 4.4 kilometres (2.7 mi) west of Nairobi's central business district. Woodley Estate is straddled by Ngong Road to the south. It borders Kilimani Estate to the north, Golf Course to the east and Kibera to the south. Electorally, most of Woodley is placed under Kibra Constituency.

== Overview ==
The estate was actualised by colonial mayor of Nairobi Sir Richard Woodley. Construction of Woodley Estate began in the late 1940s and completed in 1950. Woodley comprised 300 housing units made up of flats, and two and three bed-roomed stand-alone bungalows. It was a whites-only neighbourhood during colonial Kenya, but after independence the white residents left the country or moved out to more upscale neighbourhoods such as Karen, Kitisuru and Westlands. The estate's new residents were the influential African locals who had climbed the social ladder, such as politicians and trade unionists. In 1959, the first phase of a shopping mall of its kind was completed in Woodley: Adams Arcade Shopping Centre was intended to serve the residents of Woodley and its environs. The estate was zoned as a residential neighbourhood with occasional apartments, with a maximum of four storeys, and mainly hosts the middle-income segment of Nairobi residents.

== Points of interest ==
1. Adams Arcade, a shopping mall along Ngong Road, in Woodley.
2. Prestige Plaza, a shopping mall along Ngong Road, in Woodley.
