= Flying toilet =

Plastic bag that is used as a simple toilet substitute

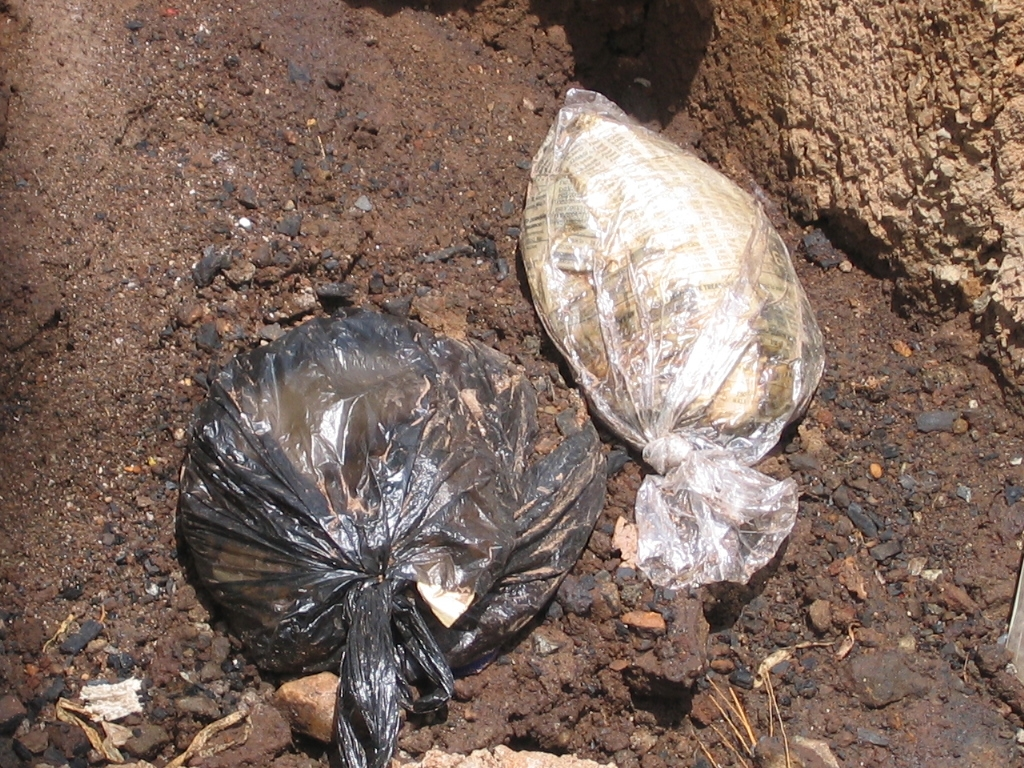
Flying toilets after they have been used (filled) and thrown away in the Kibera slum area in Nairobi, Kenya

A flying toilet is a facetious name for a plastic bag that is used as a simple collection device for human faeces when there is a lack of proper toilets and people are forced to practise open defecation. The filled and tied plastic bags are then discarded in ditches or on the roadside. Associated especially with slums, they are called flying toilets "because when you have filled them, you throw them as far away as you can".

== Usage ==
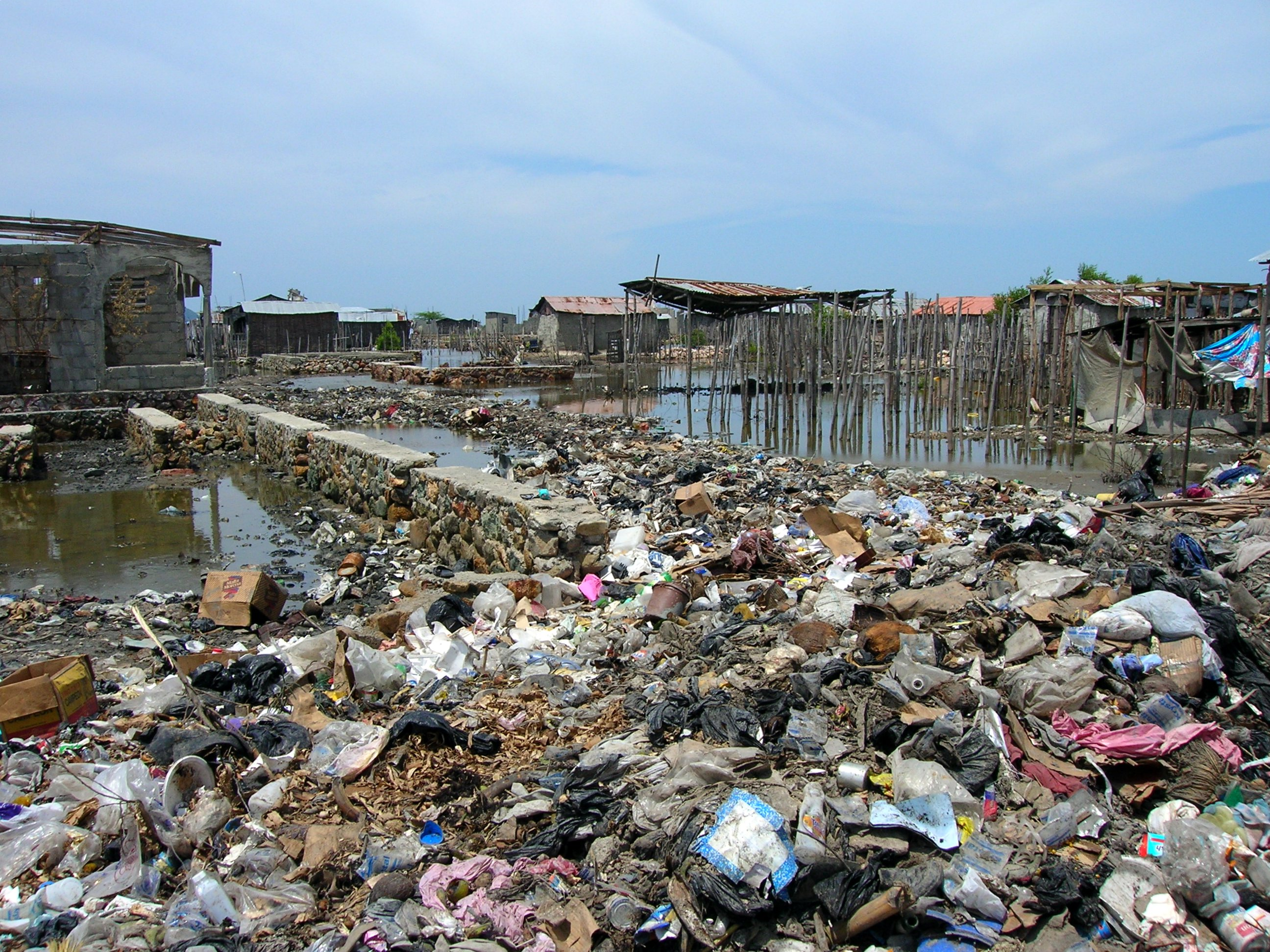
Flying toilet and other waste in a slum in Cap-Haïtien, Haiti.

Flying toilets are particularly associated with slums surrounding Nairobi, Kenya, especially Kibera. According to a report from the United Nations Development Programme launched in Cape Town on 9 November 2006, "two in three people [in Kibera] identify the flying toilet as the primary mode of excreta disposal available to them." This contradicts a Kenyan government report which indicates that 99% of Nairobi residents have access to a sanitation service. The UNDP report blames a taboo against bureaucrats and politicians discussing toilets, while others see a reluctance among the Nairobi authorities to formalise what they characterise as an "illegal settlement".

A related concept in the United States is the "trucker bomb", described in a media report as the trucking industry practice of urinating into plastic bottles and throwing them from the vehicle as an alternative to stopping the truck or using facilities at rest stops.

== Problems ==
Piles of polyethene bags gather on roofs and attract flies. Some of them burst open upon impact and/or clog drainage systems. If they land on fractured water pipes, a drop in water pressure can cause the contents to be sucked into the water system. People can also be hit by the bags if they are blindly tossed. In the rainy season, drainage contaminated with excrement can enter residences; some children even swim in it. Such close contact leads to fears of diseases such as diarrhoea, skin disorders, typhoid fever and malaria.

The practice of defecating outside, away from one's house, especially in the dark, causes concern for one's personal safety as well, especially among girls and women.

In 2009, Rift Valley Railways cited flying toilets thrown at the railway track in Kibera as the cause of a cargo train derailment in which two people were killed.

== Approaches for alternatives ==
=== Community sanitation blocks ===
Several non-profit organisations have launched a "Stop Flying Toilets" campaign in Kenya, using a winged logo and sponsoring races with famous Kenyan marathon runners. The construction of three sanitation blocks (public toilets) in Kiambiu, a Nairobi slum with 40,000 to 50,000 residents, has reduced the use of flying toilets, and thereby reduced clogging in the drainage system and outbreaks of cholera and diarrhoea. The public toilets, constructed by the non-governmental organisation Maji na Ufanisi, based in Nairobi, require a fee to use, but have been quite popular.

=== Biodegradable plastic bags containing sanitising agent ===
A more advanced and safer mobile sanitation solution, which has a similar simplicity to flying toilets and also uses plastic bags, has been developed by the Swedish company Peepoople: their toilet bag is called the "Peepoo bag", and is a "personal, single-use, self-sanitizing, fully biodegradable toilet".

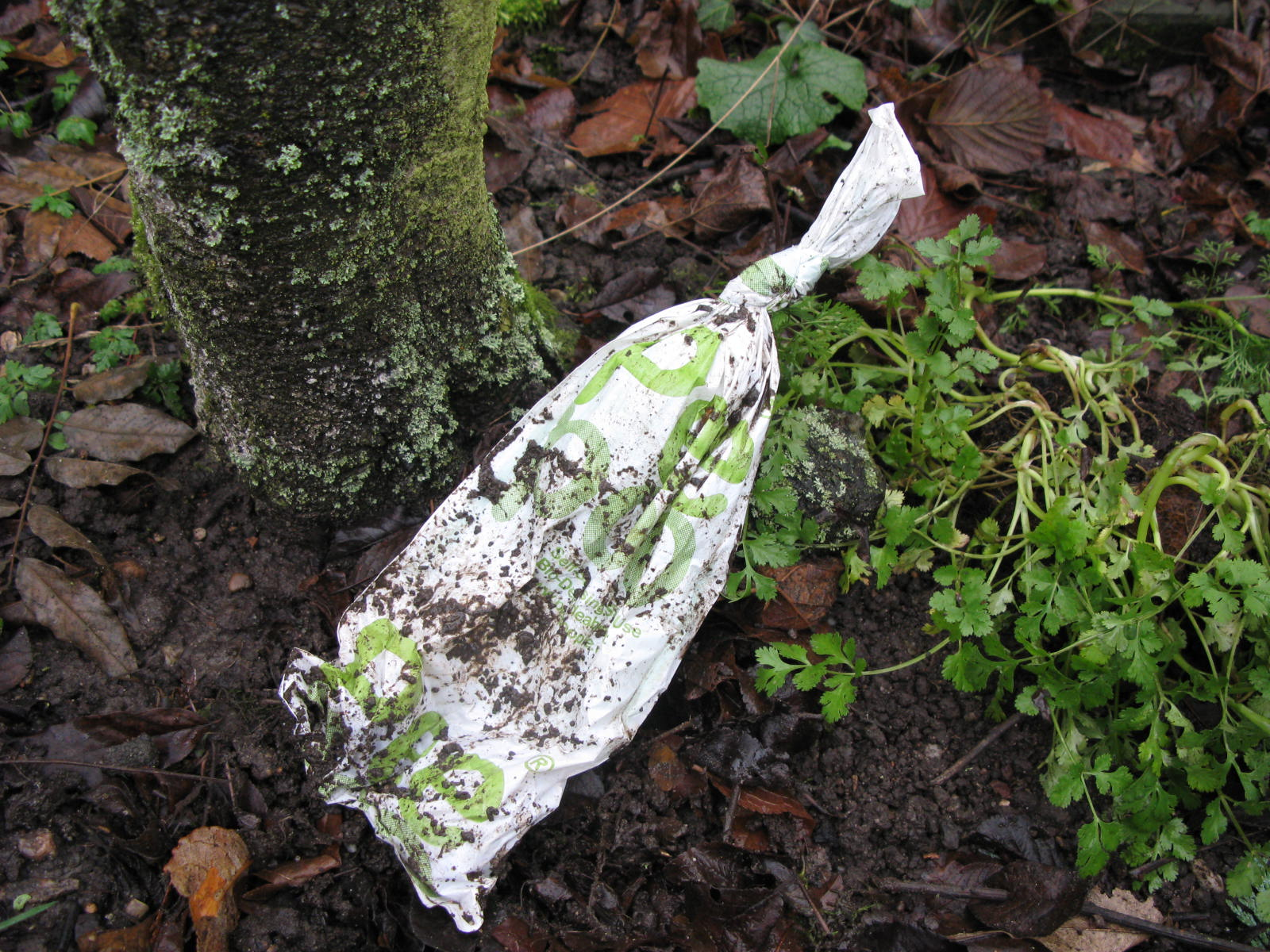
Filled PeePoo bag after about one month in the soil of a garden in Germany

This bag is being used in humanitarian responses, schools and urban slums in developing countries, such as Kenya.

=== Container-based sanitation ===
Container-based sanitation is another portable option for low-income settlements where sewerage systems are infeasible. Waste is collected in containers that can be sealed and transported for disposal. Thus users do not need to handle excreta themselves (which is a key criterion for "improved sanitation"). In one pilot study in Cap-Haïtien, Haiti, container-based sanitation almost eliminated the use of flying toilets and open defecation. However, there are typically costs associated with installation and transport of these containers, which may make them a barrier to take-up among low-income communities.

== See also ==
- Bucket toilet
- WAG bag
