= Kawangware =

Area of Nairobi, Kenya

Coordinates: 1°17′S 36°45′E

Kawangware (Swahili: [kawaŋˈgware]) is a low income residential area in Nairobi, Kenya, about 15 km west of the city centre, between Lavington and Dagoretti.

== Description ==
According to the 2009 Kenya Population and Housing Census, Kawangware's population was 133,286 people at this time. It is estimated that 65% of the population are children and youths. Most inhabitants live on less than $2 (although they earn in shillings) a day and unemployment is high; many are self-employed traders. There is a diversity of ethnic backgrounds.

Kawangware slum has more posho mills than bars, making it an 'ugali nation' for its over 130,000 mouths whose palates, unlike those of other Nairobians, have no time for supermarket unga, the grade-one sifted maize meal favoured by middle-class stomachs.

Kawangware has a scarcity of safe drinking water. Water supplied by the city authority is not available every day or it's otherwise expensive. There are waterborne diseases, respiratory pneumonia, and malaria as well as an increase in cases of airborne diseases due to the poor sewerage system in Kawangware. The local residents do heavy low-income jobs to sustain their standards of living.

Kawangware has supermarkets, a library, a medical clinic, and the Kawangware Primary School, Kawangware School, Baxter Family Center of Hope and Kawangware Academy. However, many children in the slum do not attend school.

== See also ==
- Kibera
- Mathare
- Mathare Valley
- Kiambiu
- Korogocho
- Mukuru slums
