= Kicoshep =

Kenyan non-governmental organisation

KICOSHEP, the Kibera Integrated Community Self-Help Programme, is an NGO founded by Anne Owiti in a sparse dingy clinic within the shanty settlement of Kibera in 1991. The majority of patients were diagnosed with HIV/AIDS related ailments, revealing the impact and spread of HIV/AIDS within the Kibera community and confirming the recent discovery that Kibera slum records the highest HIV/AIDS prevalence rates in Nairobi.

Kicoshep, a pioneer of the Voluntary Counseling and Testing concept, now has a network of VCT centers across Kenya.

== Kicoshep Primary School ==
The NGO runs a primary school within the Kibera slum for children affected by HIV and AIDS. Many of the children are orphans, with some adopting the parental role within their families before they even become teenagers.

The school attracts many international visitors including a number of well known celebrities, and was the focus of the Comic Relief Red Nose Day 2007 campaign videos with Ant & Dec.

== Broadband initiative ==
Kicoshep focuses on the wider impacts of HIV/AIDS as well as the immediate health issues. As part of their income generation schemes, Kicoshep has opened an Internet resource centre for the Kibera community at their base near Wilson Airport, and plan to provide wireless broadband services to local NGO's and schools with help from UK social enterprise CBN.
