= Toi Market =

Retail market in Nairobi, Kenya

Toi Market is an open-air retail market located on the outskirts of the Kibera slum in Nairobi, Kenya. The market sits on a three-acre plot on Suna Road, a by-street to Ngong Road which runs almost the length of Nairobi, from the Lang'ata area into the center of the city.

From its inception until it was razed by gangs during post-election violence in early 2008, Toi was one of the largest informal markets in Nairobi, with over 5000 traders. It mainly sells clothes and footwear, but also vegetables and other accessories.

In April 2018, the Nairobi County government announced that it would demolish the market and construct modern houses on the land. The market would be moved elsewhere, although the announcement did not specify where. The market was demolished a month later, with demolitions going on until July 2018.

However, as of November 2023, the market is still informally running, with wooden and corrugated iron kiosks scattered across the plot.
