= Siranga =

Part of Kibera Slum, Nairobi

Siranga is a part of Kibera slum in Nairobi. Its population is estimated at 150,000 residents. The Nairobi Christian Outreach Centre is in Siranga. Other parts of Kibera include Laini Saba, Lindi, Makina, Kianda, Gatwekera, Soweto East, Kisumu Ndogo, Mugumoini, Makongeni, Kichinjio and Mashimoni.

== See also ==
- Kambi Muru
- Raila
- Shilanga
