= Mathare Valley =

Informal settlement in Nairobi, Kenya

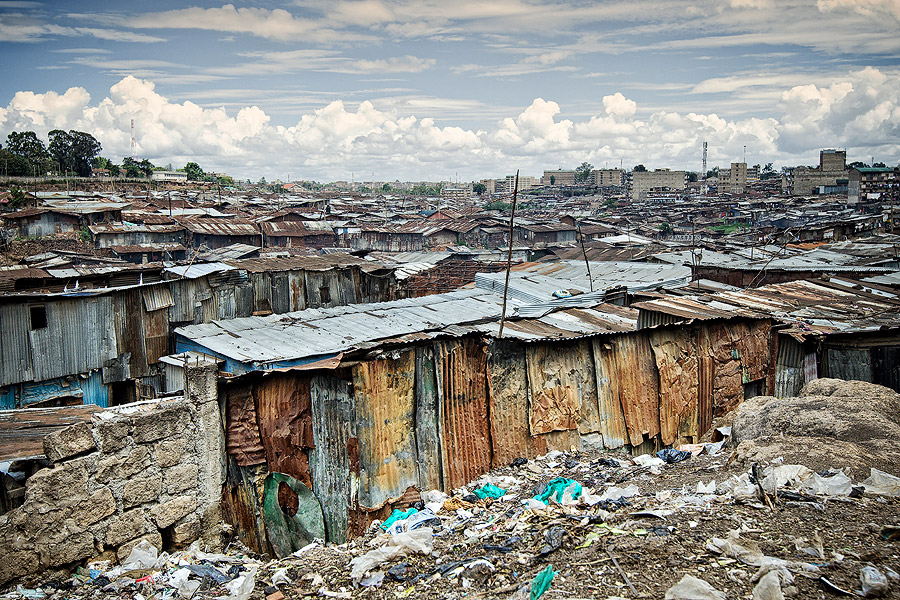
A view of the Mathare Valley slum.

Mathare Valley is a part of Mathare slum in Kenya. It is in the Nairobi area. Other informal settlements in the Nairobi area include Huruma, Kiambiu, Korogocho, Mukuru and Kibera. It has a high population density. It is a few kilometers from the centre of Nairobi. The Mathare River flows in the valley.

== Details ==
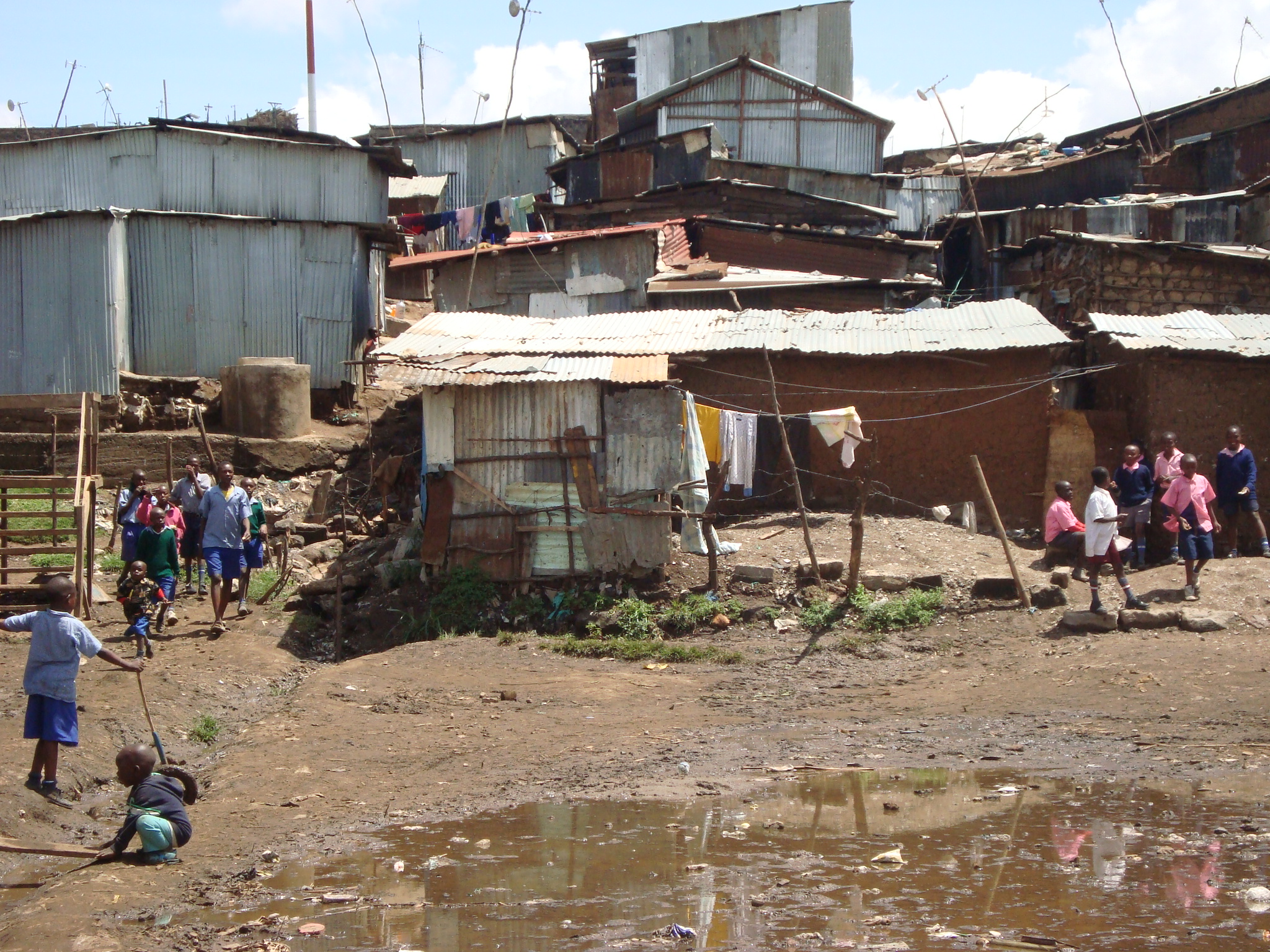
Homes in Mathare, Nairobi.

The Mathare Valley is one of the oldest and used to be one of the worst slum areas in Nairobi. People live in 6 ft. x 8 ft. shanties made of old tin and mud. There are no beds, no electricity, and no running water. People sleep on pieces of cardboard on the dirt floors of the shanties. There are public toilets shared by up to 100 people and residents have to pay to use them. Those who cannot afford to pay must use the alleys and ditches between the shanties. "Flying toilets" are plastic bags used by the residents at night, then thrown into the Nairobi River, which is the source of the residents' water supply.

Approximately 600,000 people live in an area of three square miles. Most live on an income of less than a US$1 per day. Crime and HIV/AIDs are common. Many parents die of AIDS and leave their children to fend for themselves. Mathare Community Outreach tries to care for as many of these orphans as possible, but their resources are limited.

== Notable people ==
- Peninah Musyimi, lawyer
