= Facing the Future School =

- Mashimoni, Kibera; Kenya

Information
- Established: 2011

Facing the Future School is a school located in Mashimoni, Kibera.

The school was established as a partnership with grassroots leader Simeon Ajigo in 2011 and Cross-Cultural Thresholds, a non-profit group founded by Carter Via and located in White Plains, New York.

Simeon Ajigo spent part of his childhood living in Kibera and later worked for many years at the Kibera YMCA. After conducting research, Simeon learned that a number of single mothers were giving their children alcohol while they left the house for work. For these women, it was a choice between staying at home and not having the money to feed them both, or leaving their child asleep at home, and finding the money to survive. Simeon made it his mission to build a daycare. Shortly, Simeon's vision for Facing the Future School (FAFU) grew to include a nursery, primary school, health center and a community outreach program for teenagers in Kibera.

In 2016, FAFU furthered its outreach efforts by partnering with Move to Empower, Inc., a 501(c)3 non-profit organization located in White Plains, NY. Move to Empower organizes fitness, health literacy and women's support group programs for FAFU students, faculty and parent community.
