= Mukuru slums =

Mukuru
- Informal settlement
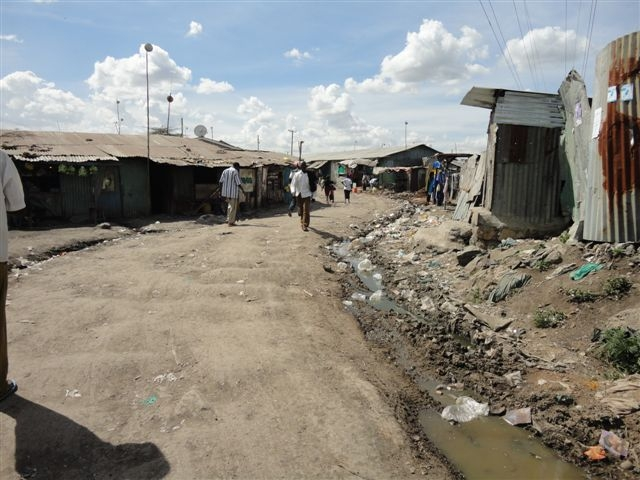
- A street in Mukuru

- Location of Mukuru in Kenya
- Coordinates: 1°19′6″S 36°52′21″E
- Country: Kenya
- County: Nairobi City
- Sub-county: Embakasi and Starehe
- Time zone: UTC+3

Mukuru is a collection of slums in the city of Nairobi. It is approximately 7 kilometres (4.3 mi) south of the central business district of Nairobi. It is one of the largest slums in Nairobi. It stretches along the Nairobi–Ngong River, situated on waste lands in the industrial area of the city between the Outering Ring Road, North Airport Road and Mombasa Road. Mukuru is among other major slums in Nairobi such: Korogocho, Kibera and Mathare.

Mukuru comprises the Mukuru kwa Reuben, Mukuru kwa Njenga, Viwandani, Mariguini, Fuata Nyayo and Kayaba villages.

== Overview ==
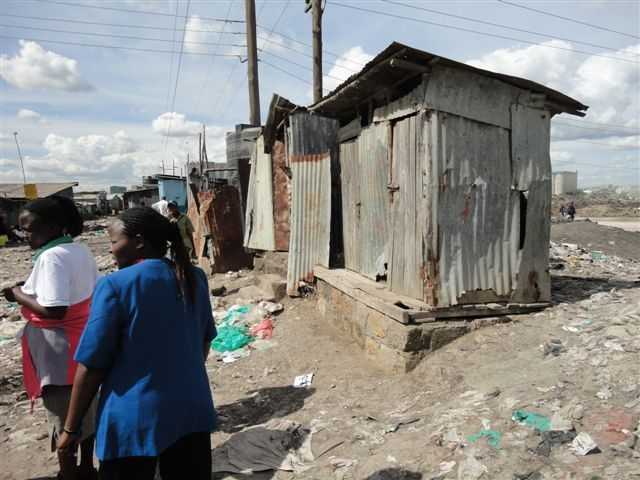
Pit latrine (right) in Mukuru

Located approximately 7 kilometres (4.3 mi) south of the Nairobi CBD, Mukuru slums are predominantly a low-income informal settlement. It consists of approximately thirty villages: Kwa Njenga, Kwa Ruben, Mariguini, Fuata Nyayo and Kayaba. The area sits south of the Viwandani and Industrial Area. The area earliest inhabitants were labourers from the nearby Industrial Area factories who made makeshifts mainly made by corrugated iron shacks. Some of the area that Mukuru slums sits on was initially a quarry that was exploited and was never rehabilitated.

Mukuru slums as any other slum in the world has been faced by challenges including crime, drug abuse, prostitution. In the slums, whole families survive in tiny one-roomed corrugated iron shacks. Very few homes have access to electricity and up to twenty families might share a communal water tap and latrine.

The area is considered unsafe due to the air pollution caused by incineration of varied waste, as well as the stench from the unauthorised landfills in the slums. Fires are also common and containing them has always been a subject of debate; mainly because the makeshifts are built close to one another and their narrow or no alleys between them.

The slums have a high prevalence of respiratory diseases, Malaria, HIV AIDS and waterborne diseases. The slums were earmarked areas more at risk in the spread of the COVID-19.

In 2017, among other slum areas in Nairobi, Mukuru was declared a Special Planning Area. Slum upgrading, initiated by the government, is an effort to provide better housing to the slum residents. Known as the Mukuru Affordable Housing, will be actualised on a 55-acre land with 15,000 housing units. Simplified sewer system is set to tackle the decades-long problem of open sewers.

== Notable people ==
Charlot Magayi and her daughter lived here. She is CEO of Mukuru Clean Stoves and a winner of the 2022 Earthshot Prize.

== See also ==
- 2011 Nairobi pipeline fire
