= Community Support Group =

National community-based organization

Community Support Group (CSG)
- Website: www.csgkibera.org

Community Support Group (CSG) is a national community-based organization working in three areas of Kenya: Kibera (a slum in Nairobi), Kisumu and Ugenya. CSG’s primary goal is to promote community development through pooling resources of community members.

== Origins ==
CSG was founded by a group of youths fresh from college in October 2001. Daniel Ogola was elected chairperson. The other office bearers as per the CSG constitution were Justus Wambua (Projects Coordinator), Collins Seroney (Treasurer) and Christopher Olongo (Organizing secretary). Others included Rebecca Ndunda and Mwalimu Elizabeth Achieng. In December of the same year it was legally registered through the Office of the Vice President and 'Ministry of Home Affairs, Heritage and Sports'.

== Organizing strategy ==
Dissimilar to the majority of NGOs working in Kenya, residence within the affected community is a prerequisite to involvement in either the board of directors or the membership of CSG. Membership is defined by participation, and, in part, by voluntary dues contributions. CSG collects membership dues to offset reliance on external funds (i.e., foreign foundations and charities).

== Accomplishments ==
CSG has worked on a variety of different projects to meet its stated goals. Some of these include: HIV/AIDS awareness clinics and outreach; Mosquito net distribution; Neighborhood cleanups; Sustainable mushroom cultivation; Informal sector worker organizing; Job and computer training; Development of the CSG Library; and Operation Tusaidiane, an ongoing indigenous community theater project.

CSG was the 2002 winner for "Best Practice: Innovative Interventions on Youth Development" awarded by the Kenyan Ministry of Gender, Sports, Culture and Social Services, Department of Social Services, Youth Division.

== Partnerships ==
Apart from a range of international relationships with individuals in advisory positions, CSG has worked most closely with the Matibabu Foundation of the United States. Matibabu provides medical care, training and equipment to residents of Ugenya, an area near Lake Victoria.

In 2006, CSG formed Helping Hands Tours & Safaris, an ecotourism agency that offers more traditional Kenya tours as well as community-based tours of the Kibera slums.

== Kibera slums ==
The Kibera slums, an area 5 kilometers southwest of City Centre Nairobi, is the most populated informal settlement in East Africa, housing more than one quarter of Nairobi’s population. The name ‘Kibera’ is a Nubian word for ‘forest.’ The original settlers were Sudanese soldiers who settled there after fighting for the British in World War I.

Kibera is roughly 2 kilometers squared with an estimated population of 1 million people. There are no residential buildings over a single storey. The average home size in Kibera is 3 meters by 3 meters, with an average of five persons per dwelling. Urban services such as water or sanitation are minimal. There is an average of one pit latrine for every 50 to 500 people.
