= Benard Otieno Okoth =

Kenyan politician

Benard Otieno Okoth is a Kenyan politician. He is a Member of Parliament of Kenya, representing Kibra Constituency, Nairobi County.

In September 2019, he was named the Orange Democratic Movement candidate for Kibra Constituency, after winning the primary election. In November 2019, he was elected Member of Parliament, succeeding his brother, Ken Okoth.

Otieno completed his secondary education in 1995 at Kirangari High School. He worked in different private companies and was constituency manager of Kibra constituency from 2014 until 2019.
