= Charlot Magayi =

Stove designer and earthshot prize winner

- Born: c. 1993 possibly Nairobi
- Occupation: running Mukuru Stoves
- Known for: award winning climate activism
- Children: Two
- Parent: orphan aged 10
- Website: Mukuru Stoves - our story

Charlot Magayi (born c. 1993) is a Kenyan stove designer, climate activist and an Earthshot Prize winner in 2022. She and her company Mukuru Stoves were awarded a million pounds. Her success led her to be called "Queen of Africa" by William, Prince of Wales.

== Life ==
Magayi was brought up in Mukuru slums in Nairobi. She became an orphan when she was ten. When she was sixteen and still at school, she gave birth to her daughter. She had to leave school to make a living for her and her daughter and she took to selling charcoal which was used locally for cooking. The fumes from the charcoal affected her and her daughter, and they repeatedly had respiratory tract infections. Magayi's daughter was burnt by their charcoal stove when she was two years old. Magayi returned to adult school and learned about the science of burning fuels and the pollutants. It is estimated that charcoal and wood are used for cooking by 950 million people in sub-Saharan Africa (c. 2022) and within 30 years the number may be 1.6 billion. These sources are heavily polluting.

Magayi founded Mukuru Stoves in 2017 which she named after the slum where they lived. The stove she designed sells for an affordable $10, and it reduces pollution to 10% compared with traditional cooking and it uses much less charcoal.

In 2018, she won the SDGs and Her award organised by UN Women. She was one of two winners; the other was the Tanzanian company WomenChoice Industries which is owned by Lucy Odiwa.

On 2 December 2022 she was announced as one of the five winners of the Earthshot Prize, which makes £1m available to her to develop her idea and reduce emissions from cooking. Her existing stove burns biomass but she has said that she plans to create an improved model which will be fuelled by ethanol.

Magayi and her company were not the only Kenyans involved with the Earthshot Prize; another winner was the Swedish Roam company with their electric vehicle Clean Our Air which has links to Kenya.

In 2024 William, Prince of Wales, gave a special mention to Magayi calling her the "Queen of Africa" for the effect she had on the lives on two million poor Africans.
