= Matopeni =

Slum in Nairobi, Kenya

Matopeni is a slum in Kenya, on the outskirts of Nairobi. Its residents belong to a variety of ethnic groups, including Kamba, Kikuyu, Luhya and Luo. There is also a Matopeni slum in Mombasa, which as of 2013 was being regenerated by Muungano wa Wanavijiji.

== See also ==
- List of slums in Kenya
