= Muungano wa Wanavijiji =

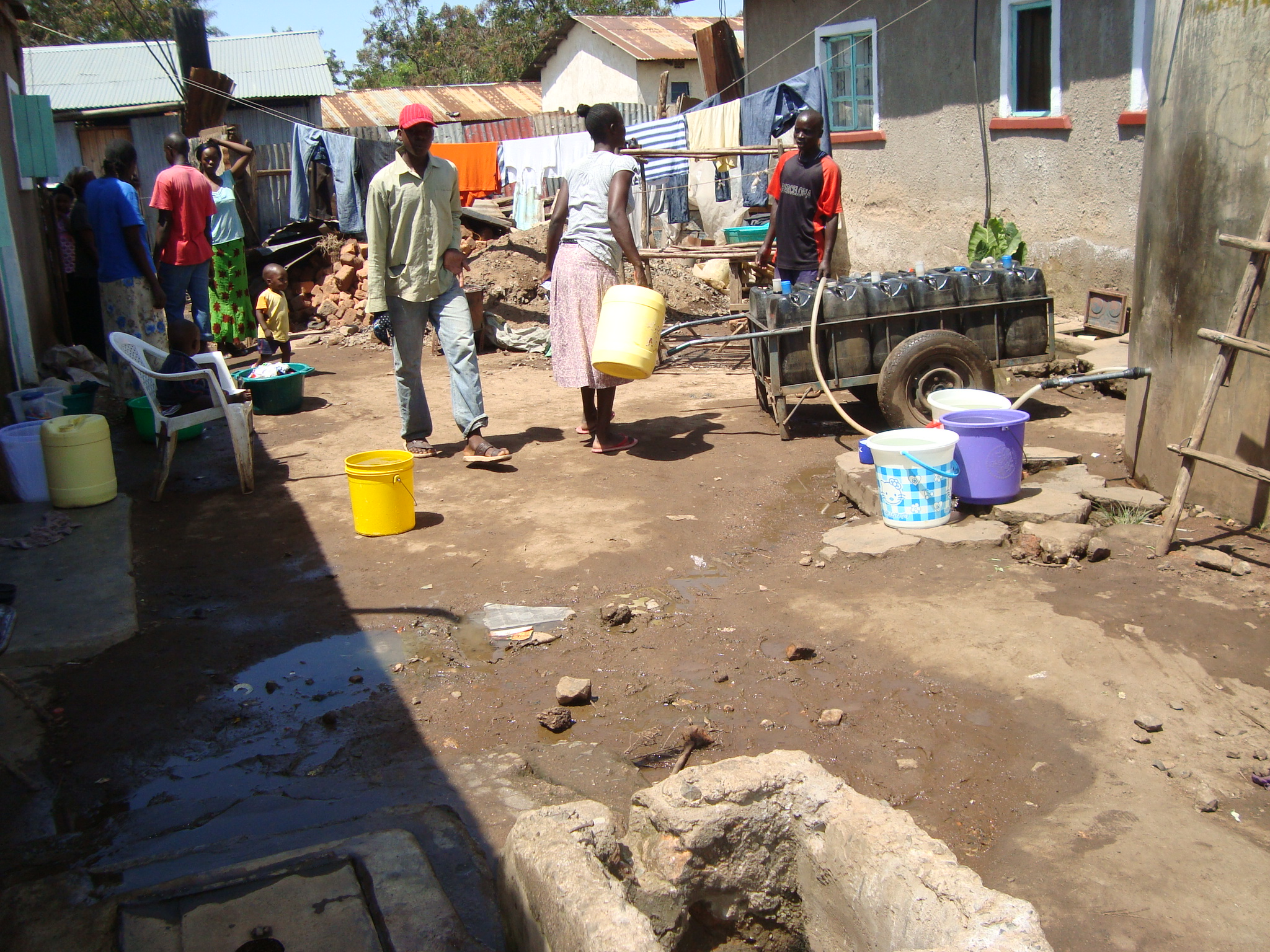
A slum household in Kisumu

Muungano wa Wanavijiji (which means united slum dwellers in Swahili), was formed in the slums of Nairobi in 1996, to represent the rights of slum dwellers. By 2000, it was nationwide and the following year it affiliated with Slum Dwellers International (SDI). The group aims to improve conditions for its members in terms of housing, sanitation and water, whilst also engaging in citizenship debates and resisting evictions. By 2014, it had set up over 100 savings funds serving 25,000 members in nine different cities through its financial wing Akiba Mashinani Trust (AMT).

In Nairobi, the capital, Muungano has worked to upgrade the Kambinoto slum set within Huruma and negotiated with both mafia interests and the Nairobi Water Company to ensure a water supply to the Kosovo slum. In 2010, it enumerated the 44,000 slum households in Kisumu.

== See also ==
- List of slums in Kenya
- Squatting in Kenya
