= Ken Okoth =

Kenyan politician (1978–2019)

Member of the Parliament of Kenya, Kibra Constituency
- In office 2013 – 26 July 2019
- Succeeded by: Imran Okoth

Personal details
- Born: Kenneth Odhiambo Okoth; 7 January 1978 Kisumu Ndogo, Nairobi, Kenya
- Died: 26 July 2019 (aged 41) Nairobi, Kenya

Ken Okoth (7 Jan 1978 - 26 July 2019) was a Kenyan politician who served as the member of parliament for Kibra Constituency from 2013 to 26 July 2019 when he died from complications caused by colorectal cancer. He was succeeded as MP for Kibra Constituency by his brother, Imran Okoth.
