= Pamoja FM =

Radio station in Kenya

Pamoja FM is a community radio station based in the slums of Kibera in Nairobi, Kenya. It was started in 2007. The slum is a lively, vibrant place and is characterised by a continuous buzz of activity. Operating from a small office at the top of a tall building overlooking Kibera, the station has close ties with the community that is actively involved in contributing to the broadcast content. Pamoja FM has received its primary funding from USAid and it focuses on community issues through debates and feature broadcasts, as well as airing a range of music shows and news.
