= Kenya Pipeline Company =

State corporation in Kenya

- Industry: Energy and Petroleum
- Incorporated: 1978
- Founded: 1973
- Headquarters: Kenpipe Plaza, Sekondi Road, Nairobi, Kenya
- Key people: Stephen Mwendwa, Ag. Managing Director Faith Boinett, Chairperson of the Board of Directors
- Products: White petroleum
- Services: Storage and transportation of petroleum
- Operating income: Ksh.10billion (gross) (2023/2014)
- Total assets: Ksh.120billion (2025)
- Owner: Government of Kenya
- Members: (2024)
- Number of employees: 500 - 1000
- Website: www.kpc.co.ke

The Kenya Pipeline Company was incorporated on 6 September 1973 and started commercial operations in 1978. It is a state corporation that manages petroleum products through its transport system and oil depot network.

The company operates under the Ministry of Energy.

Kenya Pipeline Company operates a pipeline system for transportation of refined petroleum products from Mombasa to Nairobi and western Kenya towns of Nakuru, Kisumu and Eldoret. Working closely with the National Oil Corporation of Kenya, KPC operates five storage and distribution depots for conventional petroleum products, located in Eldoret, Kisumu, Mombasa, Nairobi and Nakuru. Depots are fed by domestic-manufactured product from the Kenya Petroleum Refinery near Nairobi and imported, refined petroleum product from the Kipevu Oil Storage Facility near Mombasa. The company operates two aviation fuel depots at Jomo Kenyatta Airport, Nairobi, and Moi International Airport, Mombasa.

In collaboration with the Government, KPC facilitates the implementation of Government policies:

- Acts as a Government agent in specific projects as directed through the Ministry of Energy. To this end, the company works with the government in the implementation of key projects such as the extension of the Oil Pipeline to Uganda and the LPG import handling and storage facilities.
- Assists in the fight against fuel adulteration and dumping.
- Ensures efficient operation of petroleum sub-sector

Unlike some state corporations, KPC does not depend on government subsidies, but is a source of revenue to the government in terms of dividends and taxes. It is supported by major petroleum companies which are signatories to the network, including Dalbit Petroleum.

In 2011, the government of newly independent South Sudan expressed interest to building a pipeline connecting the oil fields in that country to the existing South-Eldoret-Mombasa pipeline in Kenya.

In 2016, it was announced that KPC has secured $350 million to install a new 865-kilometers long pipeline from Mombasa to Nairobi. KPC is the largest consumer of electricity in Kenya.

In November 2023, Kenya pipeline was listed among 11 other state corporations that were to be privatised by the Kenyan government.

In 2024 the company recorded a gross profit of KES10 billions as for the financial year 2023/2025. The company was valued at Ksh,120Billion by a government estimate in 2025

== Privatization ==
In October this year, the Privatization Commission formally issued a notice announcing the proposed privatization of the Kenya Pipeline Company after approval by parliament. This move was made in line with the government's plan to unlock fulL potential of State Owned Enterprises, increase revenue collection and lower fiscal burden in running the corporations. The company will thus be privatized through an IPO on the Nairobi Securities Exchange

== Accidents ==
- 2011 Kenya pipeline fire

== Corruption scandal ==
On 7 December 2018, Joe Sang, the CEO of the Kenya Pipeline Company (KPC), was arrested with four other senior officials in connection with the loss of an unspecified amount of money during the construction of an oil jetty in the western city of Kisumu.

== See also ==
- Upstream oil industry
- Downstream oil industry
- National Oil Corporation of Kenya
