= WAG bag =

Plastic bag used to carry human feces

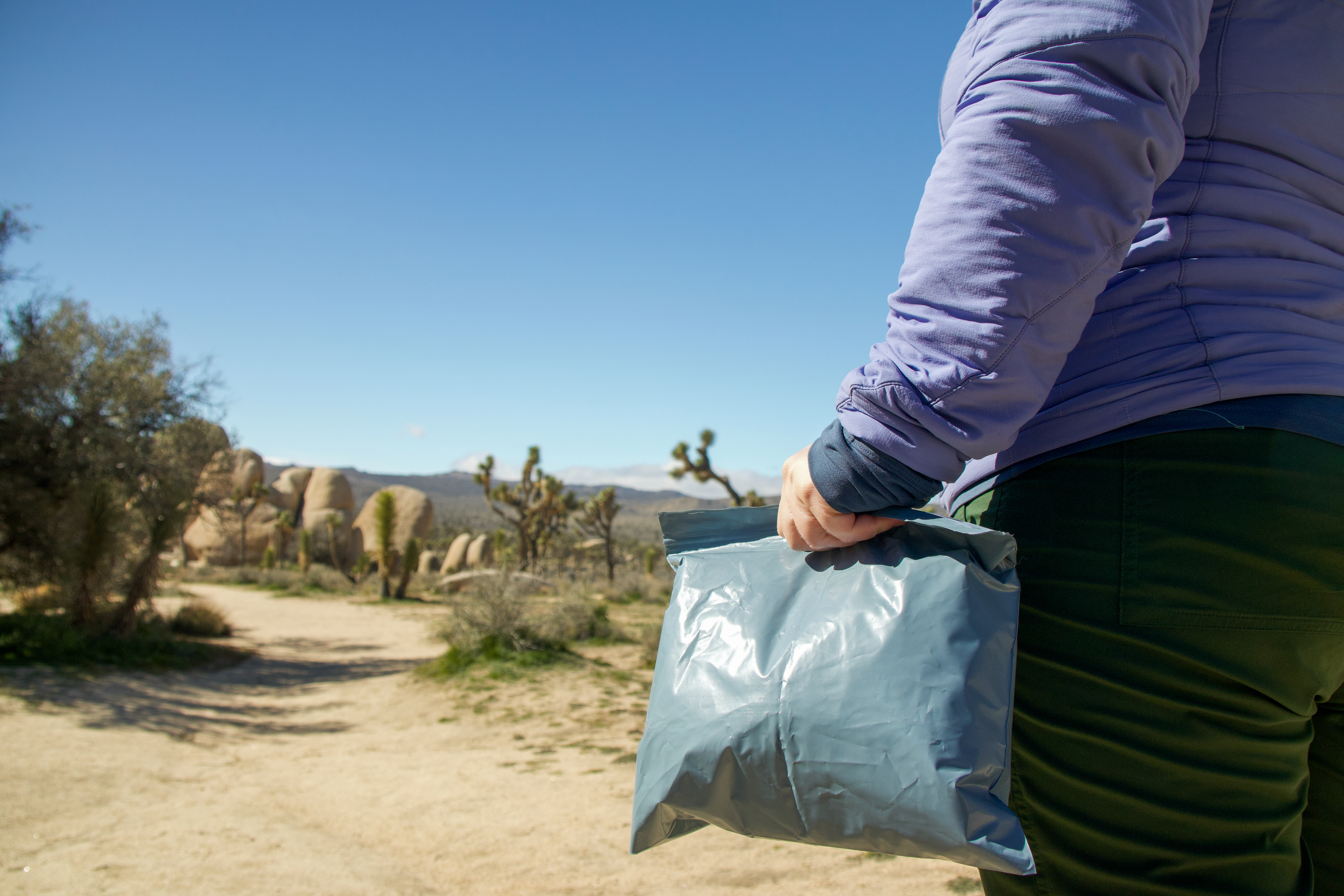
A grey WAG bag

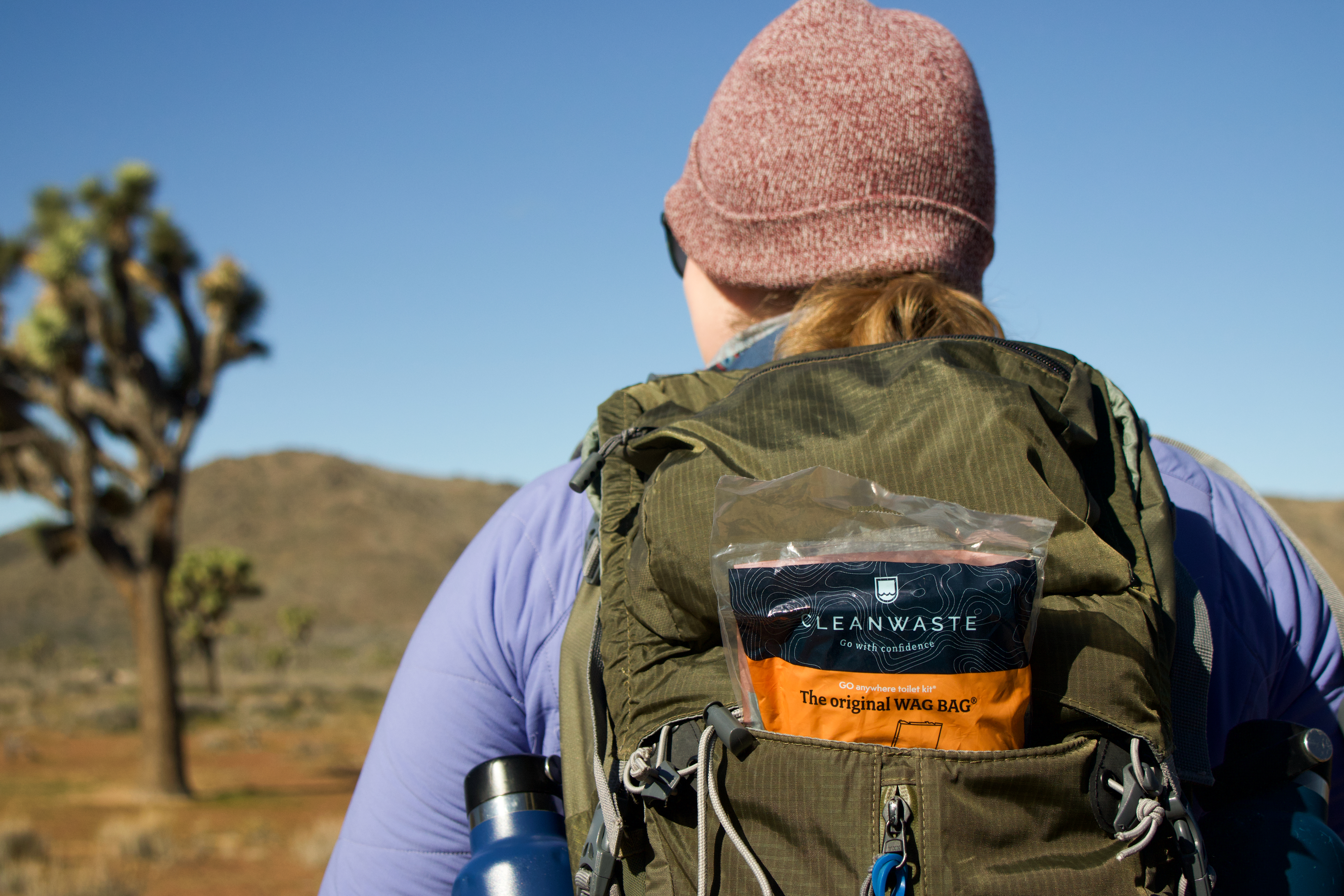
An orange WAG bag sticking out of a backpack

A WAG bag is a plastic bag used to carry human feces out of an area which has no toilets. WAG is an acronym that stands for Waste Alleviating Gel or Waste Aggregation and Gelling. Bags have a gel to immobilize liquid waste and surround and disinfect solid waste in a plastic bag, which is then put in the trash.

They can be used to line a bucket, with a toilet-seat lid. WAG bags are one method of safely packing out human waste from remote areas and places without facilities.

Typically, human feces can be buried in the backcountry. However, in certain places, such as popular hiking areas or in winter, human waste can accumulate and therefore WAG bags are used to carry out the feces to dispose of later.

Use of a WAG bag is a part of the Leave No Trace etiquette.

== Examples of use ==
WAG bags are used in the US Army, in wilderness, and where toilets are not accessible.

They are legally required on the Mount Whitney Trail because it sees so much use. Rock climbers use WAG bags when sleeping in a portaledge.

They are required for Utah river trips.

They have been proposed in Canada for urban areas where unhoused people lack toilets.

== See also ==
- Flying toilet
- Pooper-scooper
