= Peninah Musyimi =

Kenyan lawyer

- Born: December 1978; Mathare Valley, Kenya
- Education: University of Nairobi
- Occupation(s): Entrepreneur and lawyer
- Known for: Nairobi slums to lawyer

Peninah Nthenya Musyimi (born December 1978) is a Kenyan lawyer activist, who established the 'Safe Spaces' project, to empower young women who were growing up in the slums of Nairobi. The project draws on her own life experience as the first person from her neighbourhood in the Mathare Valley to graduate from university. In 2011, she was the recipient of Care International's "I am Powerful" award.

== Life ==
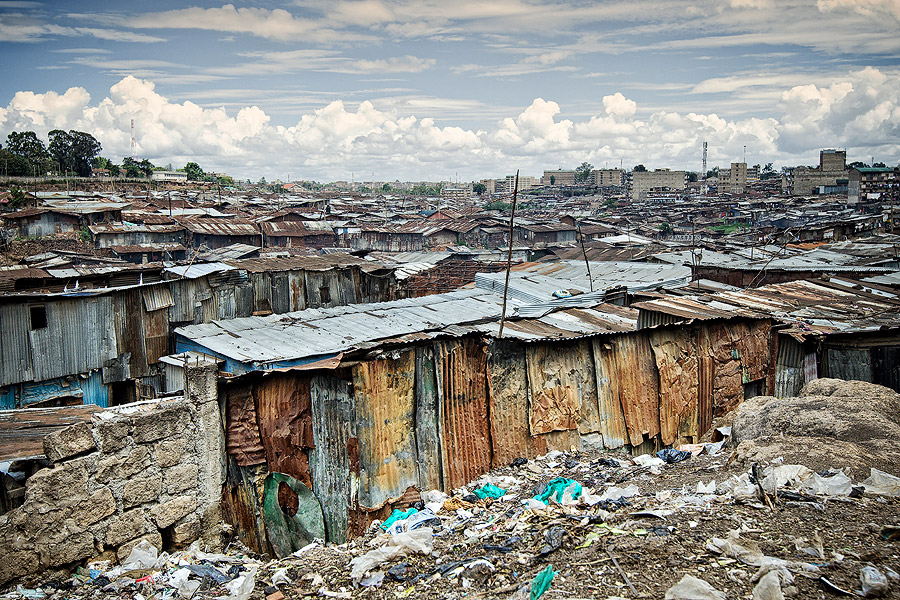
View of the Mathare Valley in 2009

Musyimi was born in December 1978 in the area of Nairobi known as Mathare Valley. Her family was poor and lived in a house without a toilet, so she worked for her neighbours for cash payment. Alcohol, drugs and prostitution are common sights in Mathare Valley, which affect the ability of young people from there to access education.

Despite lacking a uniform or shoes, Musyimi managed to begin her primary education and became an excellent student. However it was unlikely that she would be able to attend secondary school. Despite setbacks, she did manage to arrange funding, walking 16 kilometres (9.9 mi) to school every day. Musyimi wanted to go on to university, but this was without precedent for a girl from her background, plus her father wanted her to get married.

One route to a university education that was open to Musyimi was the possibility of a scholarship based on ability at basketball. However there were few sports facilities where she lived. There was a basketball court at a church and she persuaded a basketball player there to teach her. She told her trainer that once she had the skills then she could create a team at the church. With intensive training, she passed the basketball trials and obtained a $400 scholarship to attend the University of Nairobi, where she studied Law and Social Science. She was the first woman from the Mathare Valley slum to graduate from university.

After graduation, Musyimi trained as a lawyer but realized there was additional activism she could pursue. In 2008 she established "Safe Spaces" with funds from Schools without Borders and the Dutch embassy. She also partnered with the M. Night Shyamalan Foundation (where she is listed as a leader) in a collaborative effort that supported an additional of 300 new girls to the Safe Spaces. The aim of the organisation is to increase the confidence and opportunities for girls in Nairobi. The project encourages girls to have ambitions and supplies funding to support secondary and university education. It also teaches girls how to be mechanics. It began with an initial meeting in her home with a small group of teenagers, where they discussed how women were "treated like trash".

== Awards and recognition ==
In 2011 she was given that year's "I am Powerful" award by CARE on the 100th anniversary of International Women's Day. She went to Washington to receive the award.

In 2014 she delivered a TEDx talk about her story titled "I am the Change" in Amsterdam. As of February 2022, it has been viewed 10,000 times. In 2019 she was invited to Amsterdam where she spoke about emancipation at the opening of a symposium. She spoke at the Cobra Museum in aid of International Women's Day.
