= Tunapanda Institute =

Organization

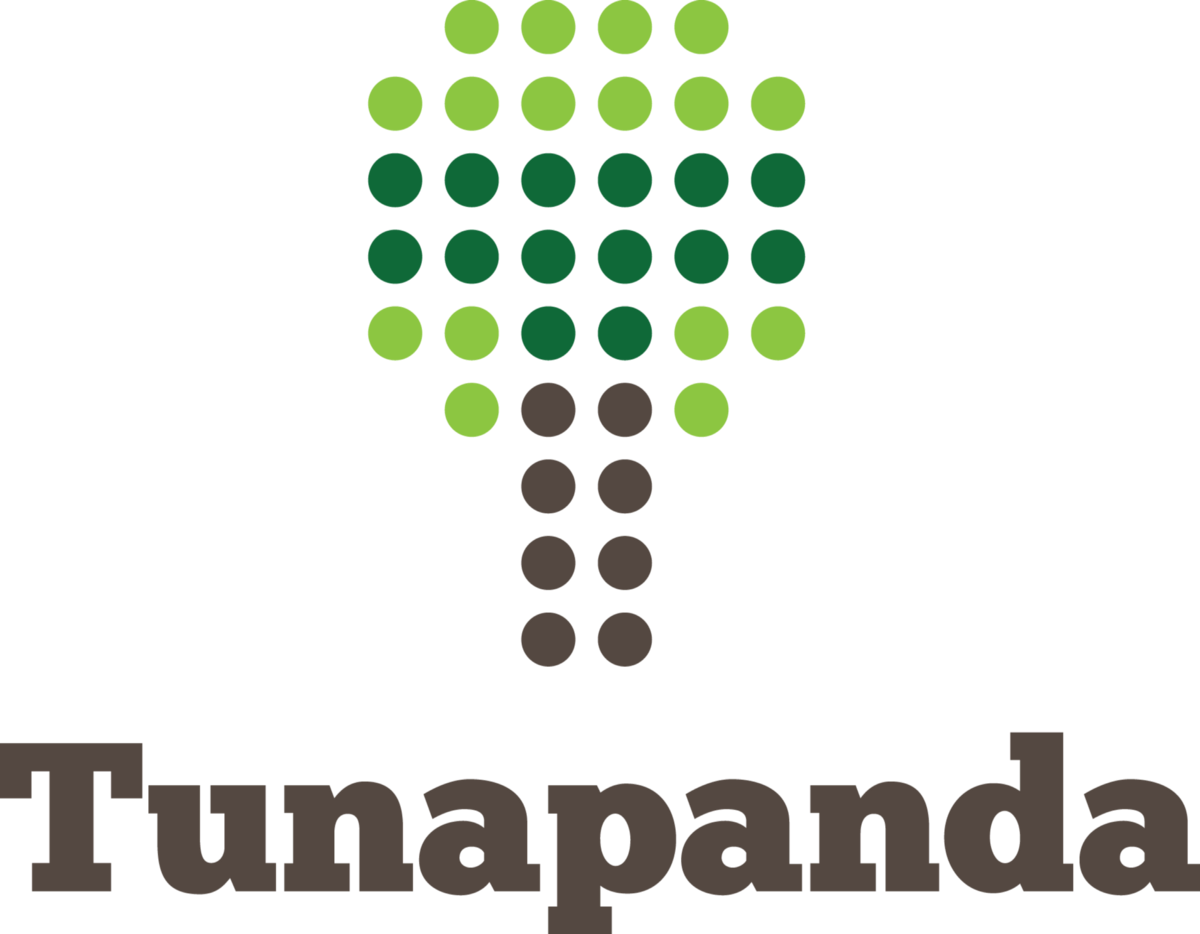
- Formation: 2013
- Founder: Jay and Mick Larson
- Headquarters: Olympic Estate, Kibera, Nairobi, Kenya
- Website: www.tunapanda.org

Tunapanda Institute (Tunapanda is a Swahili word for "we are growing") was a United States-based non-profit organization operating in East Africa. With the goal of training disadvantaged young people, various free courses in technology, design and entrepreneurship were offered to increase the chance of graduates in the labour market. The majority of its work is based in Kibera, a slum in Nairobi, but it has also operated in other parts of Kenya, Tanzania, and Uganda.

In 2016, Tunapanda Institute was named as one of 2016 NT100, Nominet Trust's annual celebration of 100 inspiring tech-for-good ventures from around the world.

== History and operations ==
Tunapanda was founded in 2013 by the brothers Jay Larson and Mick Larson, with the aim of providing learning opportunities to unconnected communities through the use of an "education on a hard drive". They downloaded openly-licensed software and educational content for computer programming, design, and business/entrepreneurship, as well as general-knowledge content from Wikipedia and Khan Academy, which they then distributed on CDs, external hard drives, and USB drives at various schools and community organizations.

Tunapanda then opened its own training facility and developed a three-month intensive training courses in technology, design and business which has to date been taught to more than 1,000 students. In 2022, as smartphone phone adoption continued to grow rapidly in Kenya, Tunapanda Institute adapted its training curriculum to prioritize a "mobile-first" approach. This shift gave rise to "Mobile LEAP," a 6-week intensive workforce training program designed to prepare the next generation of digital workers through an innovative mobile-based learning approach.

The majority of Tunapanda’s programs were based in Kibera, a slum in Nairobi, but Tunapanda has set up computer labs and training facilities in urban and rural settings within Kenya, Tanzania, and Uganda. While focused mainly on education and training, Tunapanda also provides graduates with the opportunity to earn an income from working on technology-related projects for clients and partners.

== TunapandaNET ==
In 2015, TunapandaNET was conceived as a way to provide access to digital learning materials and platforms to young people within Kibera who may not be able to afford regular internet use. The network connects schools and community centers to Tunapanda’s learning facility through wireless communication. Since content is hosted locally, the network operates as an intranet and costs considerably less for users to access content than traditional service providers. The network has grown to incorporate ten nodes within Kibera and plans to expand to more by the end of 2019.

== Kibera Aeronautics and Space Academy ==

At the end of 2018, Tunapanda launched the Kibera Aeronautics and Space Academy (KASA) with the goal of training young people interested in science and technology. The aim of the program is to equip disadvantaged people from Kibera and other surrounding regions with practical skills for life beyond the program. In the long term, a training system will be installed, with which the participants can be prepared for technological professions on the model of German dual education system and subsequently be transferred to employers.

== Awards ==
- 2016: Named as one of the 2016 NT100, Nominet Trust's annual celebration of 100 inspiring tech-for-good ventures from around the world.
