= Bingo's Run =

2014 novel by James A. Levine

- First edition
- Author: James A. Levine
- Language: English
- Publisher: Spiegel & Grau
- Publication date: January 2014
- Publication place: United States
- Media type: Print (hardcover), audiobook
- ISBN: 978-1-4000-6883-8

Bingo's Run is a 2014 novel by James A. Levine. The story follows Bingo, a street child from the Kibera slum in Nairobi, Kenya, who is a 15-year-old drug runner and "growth retard". Levine is a professor of medicine at the Mayo Clinic.
