= Viwandani, Nairobi =

Viwandani is an informal settlement (known locally as a "slum") in the city of Nairobi, Kenya. It is an electoral ward within the Makadara Constituency of Nairobi County. It borders on the Nairobi Industrial Area. The name "Viwandani" means "at the industrial zone" in Kiswahili. There are thirteen "villages" within the settlement: Jamaica, Kingstone, Lunga Lunga Centre, Lunga Lunga Donholm, Milimani, Paradise A, B, and C, Riverside, Sinai, Sinali Reli, Tetrapak, and Uchumi.

Viwandani is one of two informal settlements included in the Nairobi Urban Health and Demographic Surveillance System (NUHDSS) operated by the African Population and Health Research Center (APHRC) since 2002. The NUHDSS collects data on demographic events (births, deaths, and migrations), health outcomes (morbidity, cause of death through verbal autopsy, child vaccination, and nutrition) and socio-economic outcomes (marriage, education, livelihood, and housing characteristics). It is the source for numerous research publications indexed on the APHRC website. (The other informal settlement included in NUHDSS is Korogocho.)

== See also ==
2011 Nairobi pipeline fire (Occurred in or near SInai village within Viwandani)
