= 2011 Nairobi pipeline fire =

Pipeline explosion in Nairobi, Kenya

- Date: 12 September 2011
- Time: approx. 10:00 AM (EAT)
- Location: Mukuru-Sinai, Nairobi, Kenya; 1.3139°S 36.8795°E
- Type: Fuel spill with explosion
- Cause: Valve failure resulting in a fuel leak causing a build-up of volatile vapors
- Outcome: KPC ordered to ensure spill containment measures were in place; clean-up and/or evacuation of adjoining slums
- Deaths: ±100
- Injuries: 100+
- Accused: Kenya Pipeline Company (KPC)
- Litigation: Ongoing

The 2011 Nairobi pipeline fire was caused by an explosion secondary to a fuel spill in the Kenyan capital Nairobi on 12 September 2011. Approximately 100 people were killed in the fire and at least 116 others were hospitalized with varying degrees of burns. The incident was not the first such pipeline accident in Kenya, with the Molo fire of 2009 resulting in at least 133 fatalities and hundreds more injured.

== Causes ==
A fuel tank, located in the industrial Lunga Lunga area of Nairobi and part of a pipeline system operated by the state owned Kenya Pipeline Company (KPC), had sprung a leak. People in the adjacent densely populated shanty town of Sinai had started to collect leaking fuel when at about 10 a.m. a massive explosion occurred at the scene. Fire spread to the Sinai area.

The cause of the explosion has not yet been determined but some reports indicate that the fire might have started from a discarded cigarette or when the wind changed, bringing embers from nearby garbage fires.

Energy Minister Kiraitu Murungi is reported as saying that the disaster began when a pipeline valve failed under pressure allowing the oil to leak into the sewer. Selest Kilinda, the managing director of KPC, is reported to have said the spill occurred from two pipelines, and that engineers had already depressurised the Sinai pipeline but not in time to prevent fuel leaking into the sewer.

== Casualties ==
Early police estimates have the number of fatalities to be above one hundred; in addition, at least 116 other people were hospitalized with burn injuries. The exact death toll remains uncertain due to some bodies being badly charred or lost in the murky waters of a nearby river. Kenya's Red Cross Disaster Risk Reduction Officer said that the Red Cross would counsel the victims and also would attempt to reconcile the casualty figures with those reported missing. He also reported that most bodies taken to the mortuary were burnt beyond recognition and would require DNA tests to confirm their identities. In November 2011, The Kenya Pipeline Company funded the delivery to the Ministry of Public Health and Sanitation a computer and software system to facilitate forensic DNA identification of victims. The system, called M-FISys (pronounced like "emphasis," an acronym for the Mass-Fatality Identification System), was developed to identify victims of the World Trade Center Disaster of September 11, 2001.

City hospitals were hard pressed by the surge of the need for care provisions, food and a strained medicare staff complement. The Kenyatta National Hospital has only 22 burn unit beds and considers any more than 60 casualties as a 'disaster', requiring them to put disaster plans into action. At least 112 people were admitted with burns, many critical or severe. The long-term treatment required for burns patients means that extra tents have been erected for blood donations. The nearer Mater Hospital admitted three casualties with less than 30% burns into the normal ward and one other casualty with 80–90% burns into the intensive care unit.

== Responsibility ==
Neither the managing director of the KPC, which operates the pipeline, nor the energy minister Kiraitu Murungi have given any indication of accepting responsibility. Kiraitu Murungi initially said that the KPC would compensate the victims, but later the KPC stated it would not do so as it was "not responsible".

In 2008, the KPC had issued an eviction order to nearby residents, but they refused to leave. In response to protests by students, an inter-ministerial committee was tasked with gathering names to arrange relocation when funds became available. KPC sent representatives to inform the residents of the danger and to make sure holes were not dug.

== Political impact ==
Prime minister Raila Odinga and vice-president Kalonzo Musyoka have visited the scene and various hospitals to console injured victims and to condole bereaved families. President Mwai Kibaki visited the main Kenyatta National Hospital to empathize with the injured. The secretary-general of the United Nations, Ban Ki-moon, expressed sorrow and sympathy for the victims, wishing a full and speedy recovery to the survivors, while the United States ambassador to Kenya, Scott Gration, lauded the rescue workers and the personal heroism of the locals. Amnesty International-Kenya said that the failure to relocate people puts the majority of the blame on government officials.

== Enforcement after the event ==
The National Environment Management Authority (NEMA) said it will act against the KPC for failing to enforce EMCA 1999—and suggests that if the required spill containment measures were in place at the facility the oil would not have run off into the drains. NEMA dismissed KPC claims that they had acted sufficiently, saying they had not received the Environmental audit that is obligatory under the 2003 Environmental Impact Assessment and Environmental Audit Regulations. The slum has been in that place for approximately 20 years despite the requirement for KPC to keep those areas clear of settlement. NEMA said it would also require KPC to deal with the pollution in the environment, particularly regarding the flora and fauna along the Ngong River into which the storm drain flows.

== Warnings before the event ==
In 2009, journalist John Ngirachu wrote for the local newspaper Daily Nation and reported that the slums in Sinai being located so near to the pipeline were a disaster waiting to happen. The permanent secretary to the Ministry of Energy, Patrick Nyoike, had asked the KPC to refurbish the pipelines but it was reported that the Ministry of Finance declined.
