= Mashimoni =

Neighborhood in Kibera, Nairobi, Kenya

Mashimoni is a part of Kibera slum in Nairobi. Mashimoni Primary School, Facing the Future School, Mashimoni Good Samaritan School for the Orphans (MAGOSO) and Mashimoni Squatters Schools exist. Many of its residents are Luhyas and Kambas. It is part of Langata Constituency. Other parts of Kibera include Laini Saba, Lindi, Makina, Kianda, Gatwekera, Soweto East, Kisumu Ndogo and Siranga.

== See also ==
- Kambi Muru
- Shilanga
