= Makongeni =

Neighborhood in Nairobi, Kenya

Makongeni was an estate in Nairobi. Makongeni has been built for rail workers in the mid-20th century. The County Rep for Makongeni ward in Nairobi County is Peter Imwatok of ODM party. A Makongeni Primary School exists in Makongeni and a Makongeni Secondary School exists near Makongeni estate.

== See also ==
- Kambi Muru
- Raila
- Shilanga
- Siranga
