= Kiambiu =

Informal settlement in Nairobi, Kenya

Kiambiu (sometimes spelled as Kiambio) is a slum in Nairobi, Kenya with 40–50,000 residents. Kiambiu is 4 kilometers east of the center of Nairobi. Its name comes from the Swahili word "mbiu-mbiu", which translates as "to be on the run".

Kiambiu slum borders the Moi Air Base (Eastleigh Airport).

Of all slums in Nairobi, Kiambiu is the most recently established with a greater accessibility in pathways, drinking water resources and waste handling; these are major challenges to most slums in Kenya.

Slum upgrading is underway under a conglomeration of sector players in the informal settlement. It is viewed that basic needs such as water provision, sanitary waste management and access roads will be provided in the next five to seven years.

A local NGO called "Maji na Ufanisi" ("Water and Development") in liaison with local and bilateral development partners is actively involved in formulation of solutions and development of strategies to improve lives of the inhabitants of Kiambiu.

== See also ==
- Kibera
- Kawangware
- Korogocho
- Mathare
- Mathare Valley
- Mukuru slums
