= Mathare =

Suburb in Nairobi, Kenya

Coordinates: 1°15′36″S 36°51′43″E

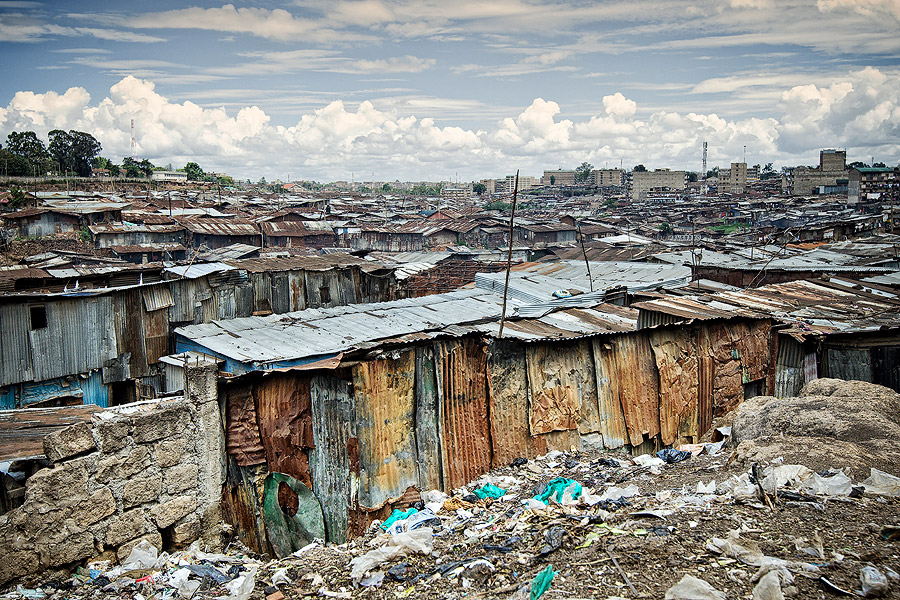
The Mathare Valley slum

Mathare is a collection of slums in Nairobi with a population of approximately 500,000 people; the population of Mathare Valley alone, the oldest of the slums that make up Mathare, is 180,000 people. Mathare is the home of football teams Mathare United and Real Mathare of the MYSA. Mathare is currently part of two electoral constituencies; the titular Mathare Constituency and the northern part being in Ruaraka Constituency. The northern part was initially part of Kasarani Constituency up to the 2013 elections when Kasarani was split into three electoral constituencies; Ruaraka being among them. The southern part was domiciled in Starehe Constituency.

== Gang violence ==
In 2006, Mathare was damaged by violence between rival gangs the Taliban (not to be confused with the Islamist group of the same name), a Luo group, and the Mungiki, a Kikuyu group. Brewers of an illegal alcoholic drink, chang'aa, asked the Taliban for help after the Mungiki tried to raise their taxes on the drink; since then, fighting between the two has led to the burning of hundreds of homes and at least 10 deaths. Police entered the slum on November 7, 2006, and the General Service Unit arrived a day later. However, many residents who fled are still afraid to return.

On June 5, 2007, the Mungiki murdered two police officers in Mathare; the same night, police retaliated by killing 22 people and detaining around 100.

Following the controversial presidential elections that took place on December 27, 2007, gangs of Kikuyu and Luo youth engaged in violent fights and burned more than 100 homes.

== See also ==
- Kibera
- Kawangware
- Kiambiu
- Korogocho
- Mukuru slums
