= Gatwekera =

Neighborhood in Kibera, Nairobi, Kenya

Gatwekera (Gatuikira) is a part of Kibera slum in Nairobi. Its population likely exceeds 70,000. Water & Sanitation for the Urban Poor is active there. Many of its residents are Luo. Médecins Sans Frontières used to run a health center there. Other parts of Kibera include Laini Saba, Lindi, Makina, Kianda, Mashimoni, Soweto East, Kisumu Ndogo and Siranga.
