= Kisumu Ndogo =

Kisumu Ndogo is a name given to villages or settlements that are part of two informal settlements in Nairobi, Kenya, Kibera and Korogocho. Kisumu Ndogo means little Kisumu. Most dwellers of these villages are believed to be of low income. Nowadays, there are many villages across the country called Kisumu Ndogo. For example, there are in fact two Kisumu Ndogo villages in Kilifi county alone, one in Malindi sub county and one in Kilifi North sub county. There is also one in Mombasa and Nakuru Counties.

The original settlers of Kisumu Ndogo in Kibera were from the Kisumu area in western Kenya, and that settlement has a major Luo population. A Winners' Chapel is active in Kisumu Ndogo. The Kenya Water for Health Organisation (KWAHO) is active in Kisumu Ndogo. Other parts of Kibera include Laini Saba, Lindi, Makina, Kianda, Mashimoni, Soweto East, Gatwekera and Siranga.

Korogocho includes the villages of Korogocho A, Korogocho B, Kisumu Ndogo, Gitathuru, Highridge, Grogan A, Grogan B and Nyayo.
