= Korogocho =

- informal settlement (currently being upgraded by NYS)
- Nickname: Koch
- Nairobi slums locations

- Location within Kenya
- Coordinates: 01°13′00″S 36°55′00″E
- Province: Nairobi Province
- District: Nairobi East
- Division: Kasarani
- Location: Korogocho
- settled: 1960s

Area
  - Total: 1.5 km^{2} (0.58 sq mi)
- Elevation: 1,603 m (5,259 ft)

Population (2008)
  - Total: 150,000
  - Density: 100,000/km^{2} (260,000/sq mi)
- est.
- Time zone: UTC+3

Korogocho is one of the largest slum neighbourhoods of Nairobi, Kenya. Home to 150,000 to 200,000 people pressed into 1.5 square kilometres, northeast of the city centre, Korogocho was founded as a shanty town on the then outskirts of the city.

In 2009 it was estimated to be the fourth largest slum in Nairobi, after Kibera, Mathare Valley and Mukuru kwa Njenga.

== Etymology ==
The name Korogocho is a Swahili term meaning crowded shoulder to shoulder.

== Location ==
Located 11 kilometres northeast of the Nairobi city centre, Korogocho's 1-1.5 square kilometres were originally on government owned land which was a vacant outskirt when it was founded by rural migrants to the city in the 1960s. It borders one of Nairobi's main rubbish dumps, Dandora. Korogocho is an electoral ward within the Ruaraka constituency in Nairobi County, and is divided into nine "villages": Gitathuru, Grogan A and B, Highridge, Kisumu Ndogo, Korogocho A and B, Ngomongo, and Nyayo.

As Korogocho expanded, it grew onto private land, and almost half its land is now owned privately.

== Ethnicity ==
Korogocho residents come from more than thirty ethnic groups, although most are from the Kikuyu, Luo, and Luhya peoples. It is also significant to note large Muslim community who are also residents of this area.

== Infrastructure ==
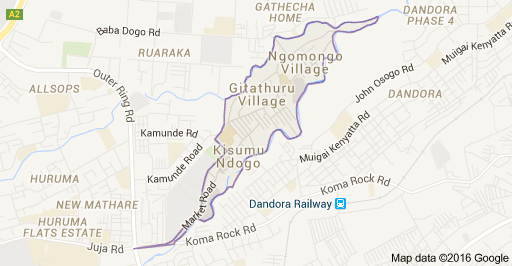
The limits of Korogocho within Nairobi.

There is little formal infrastructure serving Korogocho's residents. Most housing was built by families living there, and is made of found or recycled materials. Despite this, many of the residents pay land rent for the right to live there. Others pay rent to those who have constructed their habitations. There is no central sewer system or piped fresh water, and crime rates are high. An informal council of elders and chieftaincy, like that found in much of Kenya, also provides land and housing for some widows and others in greater need.

Small scale farming is commonly practiced, despite the crowded conditions. There is no system of street lighting, resulting in increased insecurity and the construction of special lighted safe areas by government and NGOs. There is a Kenyan Police station, along with the chieftaincy at the very centre of Korogocho village. Crime is endemic, and law enforcement in the shanty towns are poor. Organised crime groups are said to operate here. In 2004 the Zambian diplomat Osward Banda was murdered and his five-year-old son, tied to his dead father, was left in his car in a Korogocho street.

== Health ==
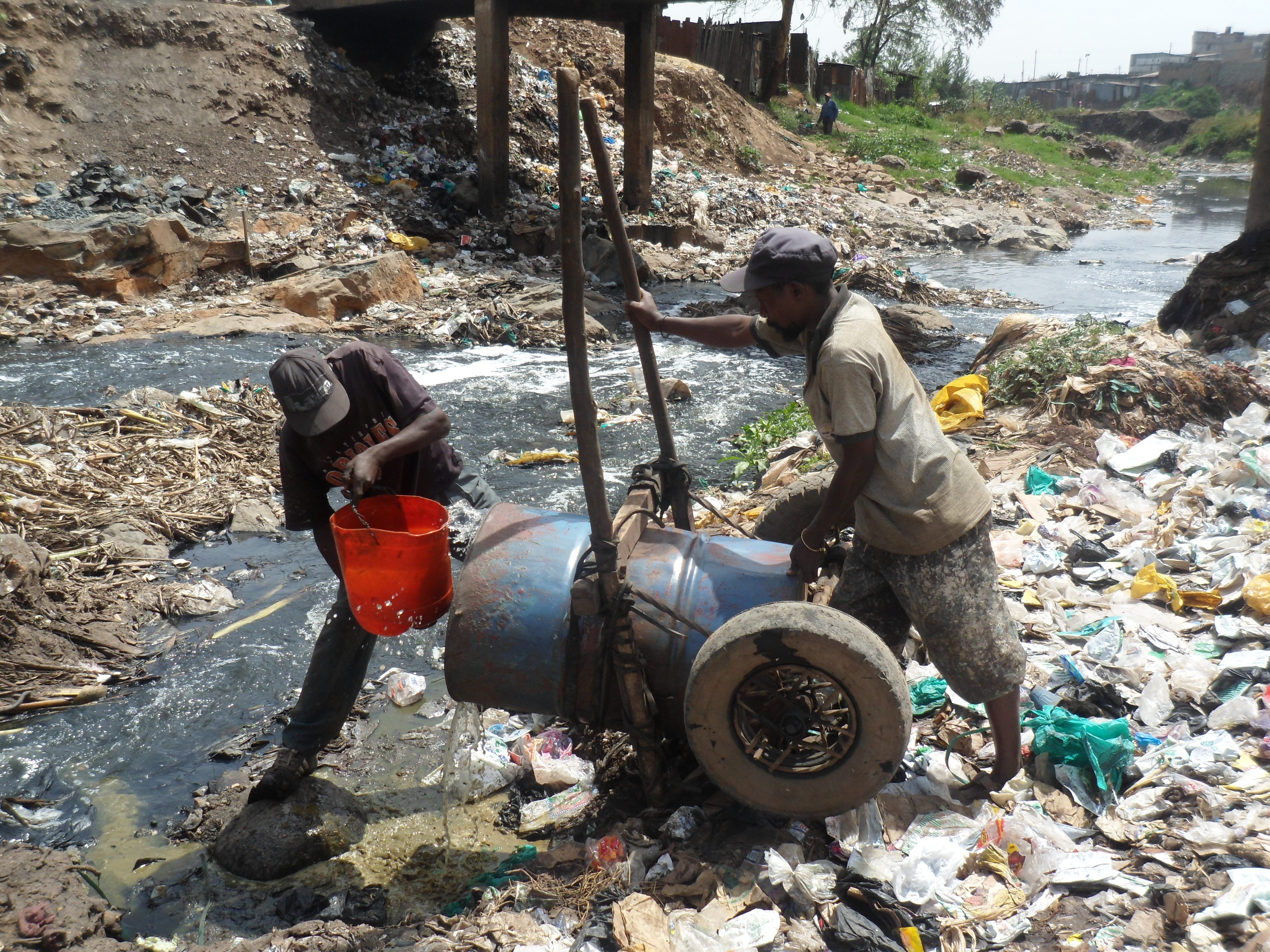
Rinsing sewerage drums after they have been emptied into the Nairobi River.

With poor infrastructure, few resources, overcrowding, and proximity to the dump, health in Korogocho is poor. Several organisations provide free clinics in the slum, while other organise HIV/AIDS prevention work. The area has been singled out by officials because of high illegal drug and alcohol abuse, and had an estimated 14% HIV infection rate in 2008.

An education centre has been set up in Korogocho called the " Caretakers Orphans Education Centre" CEOC funded by charitable donations in the UK to help HIV orphaned children gain an education, food, and basic medical attention.

Korogocho is one of two informal settlements included in the Nairobi Urban Health and Demographic Surveillance System (NUHDSS) operated by the African Population and Health Research Center (APHRC) since 2002. The NUHDSS collects data on demographic events (births, deaths, and migrations), health outcomes (morbidity, cause of death through verbal autopsy, child vaccination, and nutrition) and socio-economic outcomes (marriage, education, livelihood, and housing characteristics). It is the source for numerous research publications indexed on the APHRC website. (The other informal settlement included in NUHDSS is Viwandani.)

== Development programmes ==
Slums, covering only 5% of Nairobi, provide homes for 2.5 million Kenyans, well over half the city's entire population. Several large Italian development projects are based in Korogocho, including those funded by Italian Government and World Bank debt swaps, and a coalition of Catholic Church charities, Bega Kwa Bega, founded in 1991 and based on an earlier project by the Italian Comboni Missionary society, begun in 1973.

The Government of Kenya created a development body in 2008 focused solely upon improving the lives of Korogocho residents, the Korogocho Slum Upgrading Programme (KSUP) . The KSUP is funded through the Italian Government as part of a debt swaps scheme and involves representatives from UNHabitat, local government and federal government. Local representation for the people of Korogocho was to be guaranteed through the establishment of a Koch Resident's Committee (KRC) consisting of 6 residents from each of the 8 'villages' in Koch, totaling 48 people.

It was headed by a Chairman (Peter Kinyanjui), Secretary (John Okello alias Ali Okello) and Treasurer (Nyaga, a former enforcer and gangster). Membership of the KRC is supposed to be through democratic election every two years. However, an election was due in November 2010 but the current members refused to stand down and have turned themselves into a Community Based Organization (CBO), unlawfully, since the money they control is not for their personal use.

Although the KRC was set up to be a representative body for Koch residents, the committee has, over the last two years, turned into a corrupt organization headed by self-interested individuals who wield significant power because of the large amounts of money and resources they have access to.

Korogocho came to popular attention in some parts of the west following the marketing of several export based craft and clothing companies which were founded there, while the 2007 Seventh World Social Forum ended its Nairobi summit with a half marathon which was begun, symbolically, in Korogocho slum.

The residents of Korogocho are increasingly organizing their own development projects. One example is Komb Green Solutions, a community-based organization funded in 2017 to engage youth in improving the environment of the community. A group of young men formed Suluhu Hub in 2018 to create short films about life in Korogocho. They seek to empower youths to avoid criminal activities through peer mentorship programs. KochFM is a nonprofit community radio station registered as a community-based organization (CBO) in 2006. It was established so that community residents could tell their own stories and counter negative images presented in other media.

== Sport ==
Korogocho is the home of the 2013 founded Austrian-Kenyan development project Acakoro Football Academy. The academy has brought fame to the informal settlement for winning against FC Barcelonas U11 team in a European elite tournament in 2015. Since then the academy has replicated this success in beating Athletico Madrids youth team in the following year. Sylvia Makungu is a graduate of the academy currently playing for ÖFB-Frauenliga team FC Wacker Innsbruck (2002).

== Political unrest ==
Korogocho was one of the sites of the 2007-2008 unrest over the disputed presidency of Kenya. At least fifteen men died in one incident at the end of 2007, when ethnic and political divisions resulted in rioting and battles with the police.

== Market ==
This is an informal market not licensed by Nairobi city council. It specialises in selling fresh food produces and also new and second hand clothes. It operates every day with no official hours. It is a bit disorganised in terms of the arrangements but people trade within the constrains of the disorderliness. It is located adjacent to Korogocho slums opposite Dandora estate.
