= Soweto East =

Soweto East is a part of Kibera slum in Nairobi. Its population has been estimated at 70,000 persons. Slum residents have to pay more than others for water. Other parts of Kibera include Laini Saba, Lindi, Makina, Kianda, Mashimoni, Gatuikira, Kisumu Ndogo and Siranga.
