= Laini Saba =

Laini Saba is a slum of Nairobi, the capital of Kenya. It belongs to the major slum of Kibera. As for Lindi, another village within Kibera, its population is estimated at 100,000. Soweto East is another village belonging to Kibera. The price of water there clearly is above Nairobi average. A Laini Saba Primary School exists.

== Other slums in the Nairobi area ==
- Dandora
- Huruma
- Kiambiu
- Korogocho
- Mathare
- Mukuru kwa Njenga
- Pumwani
