= Kianda =

Goddess

- Water Goddess
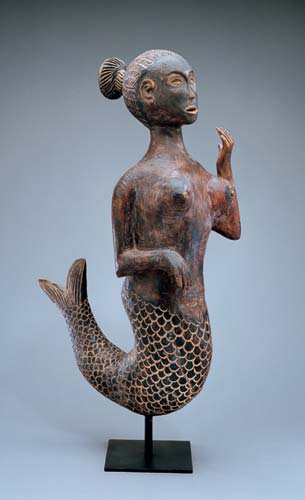

Equivalents
- Kongo: Simbi
- Sawabantu: Jengu

Kianda (or Dandalunda) is a goddess of the sea, of the waters, and a protector of fishermen in traditional Angolan culture.

== Veneration ==
Kianda was traditionally worshipped by throwing offerings such as food and clothing into the sea. Every year the Luanda Island Feast is held to honor the deity. The mosasaur Prognathodon kianda, found in Angola, was named after her.

== Arts and Literature ==
The Angolan author Pepetela uses the Kianda as a central figure in his short story "Magias do Mar" as well as his novel O Desejo de Kianda (lit. The Wish of Kianda, published in English as The Return of the Water Spirit).
