= Lindi, Nairobi =

Lindi is a suburb of Nairobi, the capital of Kenya. It belongs to the major slum of Kibera. As for Laini Saba, another village within Kibera, its population is estimated at 100,000. Soweto East is another village belonging to Kibera. The price of water there clearly is above Nairobi average. A Lindi Friends Primary School exists.

== Other slums in the Nairobi area ==
- Dandora
- Huruma
- Kiambiu
- Korogocho
- Mathare
- Mukuru kwa Njenga
- Pumwani
