= Kibera =

Neighbourhood of Nairobi, Kenya

Coordinates: 1°19′S 36°47′E

- Informal Settlement
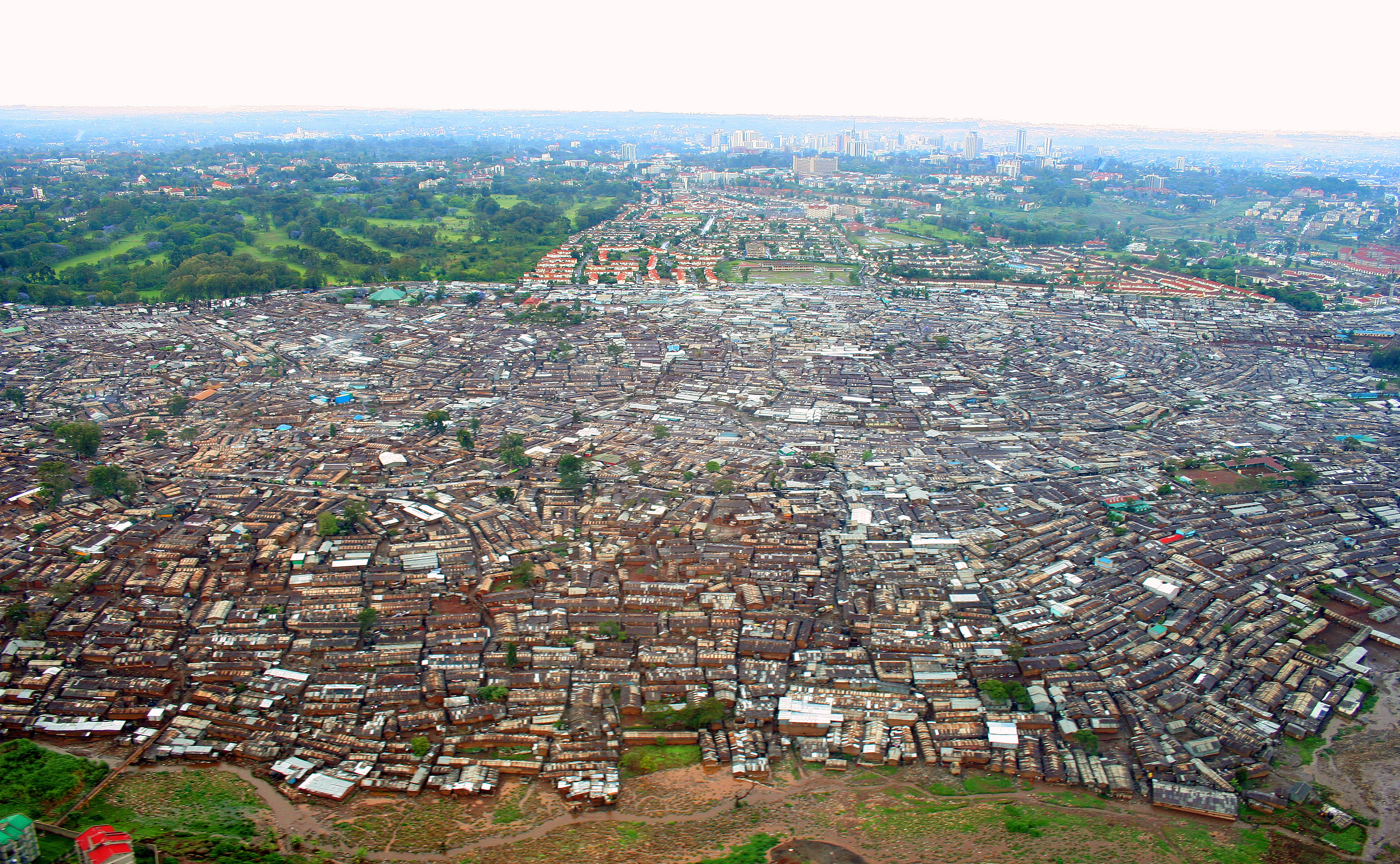
- Kibera slums

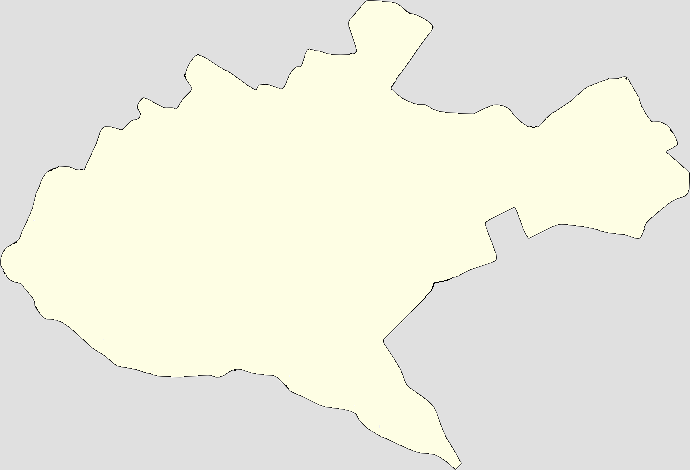
- Location within Nairobi
- Country: Kenya
- Counties: Nairobi City County
- Slum: Nairobi
- Established: 1899

Population
  - Total: 1,000,000

Kibera (Kinubi: Forest or Jungle) is a division and neighbourhood of Nairobi, Kenya, 6.6 kilometres (4.1 mi) from the city centre. Kibera is the largest and most studied slum in Nairobi, and also the largest urban slum in all of Africa. The 2009 Kenya Population and Housing Census reports Kibera's population as 170,070, contrary to previous estimates of one or two million people. Other sources suggest the total Kibera population may be 500,000 to well over 1,000,000 depending on which slums are included in defining Kibera.

In 2009, a survey conducted by the French Institute for Research in Africa found that the average Kibera slum resident lives in extreme poverty, earning less than US$2 per day. Unemployment rates are high. 12% of the population are living with HIV. Cases of assault and rape are common. There are few schools, and most people cannot afford education for their children. Clean water is scarce. Diseases caused by poor hygiene are prevalent. A great majority living in the slum lack access to basic services, including electricity, running water, and medical care.

The government initiated a clearance programme to replace the slum with a residential district of high-rise apartments, and to relocate the residents to these new buildings upon completion.

The neighbourhood is divided into a number of villages, including Kianda, Soweto East, Gatwekera, Kisumu Ndogo, Lindi, Laini Saba, Silanga, Makina, Salama, Ayany, and Mashimoni.

== History ==
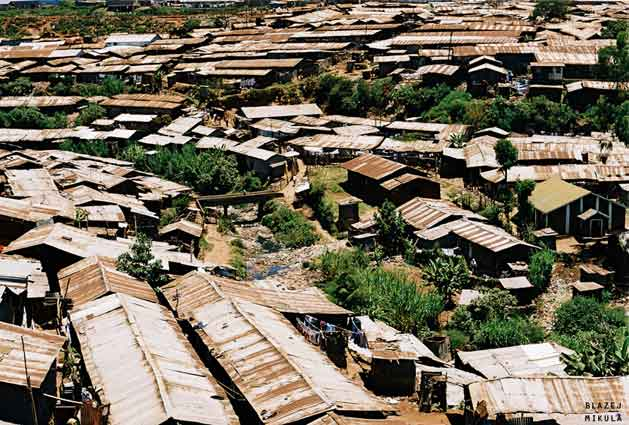
Kibera slum in Nairobi, Kenya, in 2005. It is the largest slum in Africa and the third largest in the world.

=== Colonial era ===
The city of Nairobi, where Kibera is located, was founded in 1899 when the Uganda Railway line was built, thereby creating a need for its headquarters and British colonial offices. The colonial administration intended to keep Nairobi as a home for Europeans and temporary migrant workers from Africa and Asia. The migrant workers were brought into Nairobi on short-term contracts, as indentured labour, to work in the service sector, as railway manual labour and to fill lower-level administrative posts in the colonial government.

Between 1900 and 1940, the colonial government passed a number of laws – such as the 1922 Vagrancy Act – to segregate people, evict, arrest, expel and limit the movement of the natives and indentured workers. Within Nairobi, Africans could live in segregated "native reserves" at the edge of the city. Permits to live in Nairobi were necessary, and these permits separated living areas of non-Europeans by ethnic group. One such group were African soldiers who served the military interests of the British colonial army, and their assigned area developed into a slum, now known as Kibera.

Kibera originated as a settlement in the forests at the outskirts of Nairobi, when Nubian soldiers returning from service with the King's African Rifles (KAR) were allocated plots of land there in return for their efforts in 1904. Kibera was situated on the KAR military exercise grounds in close proximity to the KAR headquarters along Ngong Road. The British colonial government allowed the settlement to grow informally. The Nubians had no claim on land in "Native Reserves" and over time, other tribes moved into the area to rent land from the Nubian landlords. With the increase in railway traffic, Nairobi's economy developed, and an increasing number of rural migrants moved to urban Nairobi in search of wage labour. Kibera and other slums developed throughout Nairobi.

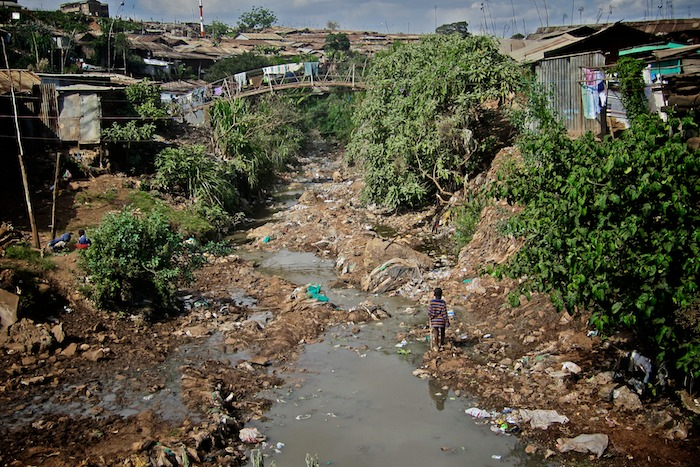
Kibera slum was established in early 20th century, and has grown ever since on public lands, around water streams and railway tracks. Its current residents are people from all major ethnic groups of Kenya.

Proposals were made in the late 1920s to demolish and relocate Kibera, as it was within the zone of European residential holdings; however, the residents objected to these proposals. The colonial government considered proposals to reorganise Kibera, and the Kenya Land Commission heard a number of cases which referred to the "Kibera problem". By then, Kibera was not the only slum. A 1931 Colonial Report noted the segregated nature of housing in Nairobi and other Kenyan towns, with housing for Europeans reported as good, and widespread prevalence of slum property for Africans and other non-European migrants.

=== Post-independence ===
After Kenya became independent in 1963, a number of forms of housing were made illegal by the government. The new ruling affected Kibera on the basis of land tenure, rendering it an unauthorised settlement. Despite this, people continued to live there, and by the early 1970s landlords were renting out their properties in Kibera to significantly greater numbers of tenants than were permitted by law.

The tenants, who are highly impoverished, cannot afford to rent legal housing, finding the rates offered in Kibera to be comparatively affordable. The number of residents in Kibera has increased accordingly despite its unauthorised nature. By 1974, members of the Kikuyu tribe predominated the population of Kibera, and had gained control over administrative positions, which were kept through political patronage.

A shift in Kenyan demographics has taken place since then, with the Luo and Luhya tribes from the West of Kenya being the primary sources of internal emigration. By 1995 Kibera had become a predominantly Luo slum and Mathare Valley nearby the predominantly Kikuyu slum area. The coincident rise of multi party politics in Kenya has caused the Luo leader and MP for much of Kibera, the parliamentary seat of Langata, Raila Odinga to be known for his ability to bring out a formidable demonstration force instantly. Meanwhile, Mathare Valley has become a hotbed of gang warfare. Political tensions in the nation between the ethnic tribes escalated after the re-election of President Kibaki in 2007.

The relative location of Kibera in Nairobi

The Nubian community has a Council of Elders who are also the Trustees of its Trust. This Trust now claims all of Kibera. It claims that the extent of their land is over 1,100 acres (4.5 km^{2}). It claims that owing to State sanctioned allotments the land area is now reduced to 780 acres (3.2 km^{2}). The Government does not accept their claims but its rehousing program envisions a land extent around 300 acres (1.2 km^{2}) for the claimed Nubian settlement. Neither side has left any room for negotiation from this position.

Presently, Kibera's residents represent all the major Kenyan ethnic backgrounds, with some areas being specifically dominated by peoples of one ethno-linguistic group. Many new residents come from rural areas with chronic underdevelopment and overpopulation issues. The multi-ethnic nature of Kibera's population, combined with the tribalism that pervades Kenyan politics, has led to Kibera hosting a number of small ethnic conflicts throughout its century-long history. The Kenyan government owns all the land upon which Kibera stands, though it continues to not officially acknowledge the settlement; no basic services, schools, clinics, running water or lavatories are publicly provided, and the services that do exist are privately owned.

== Geography ==
Kibera is in southwest Nairobi, 6.6 kilometres (4.1 mi) from the city centre. Much of its southern border is bounded by the Nairobi river and the Nairobi Dam, an artificial lake that used to provide drinking water to the residents of the city, but now there are two main pipes going into Kibera.

Kibera is divided into thirteen villages and two estates, including Kianda, Soweto East, Gatwekera, Kisumu Ndogo, Lindi, Laini Saba, Siranga, Makina, Salama, Ayany and Mashimoni.

=== Built environment ===
Kibera's morphology is very dynamic. Between 2006 and 2014 a spatiotemporal change of single buildings and building blocks across the areas of Lindi, Mashimoni, Laina Saba and Soweto East was measured (77% rise in number of buildings, density increase by 10%). Yet, its organic structure and pattern (building blocks, pathways), generally remained unchanged.

== Demographics ==
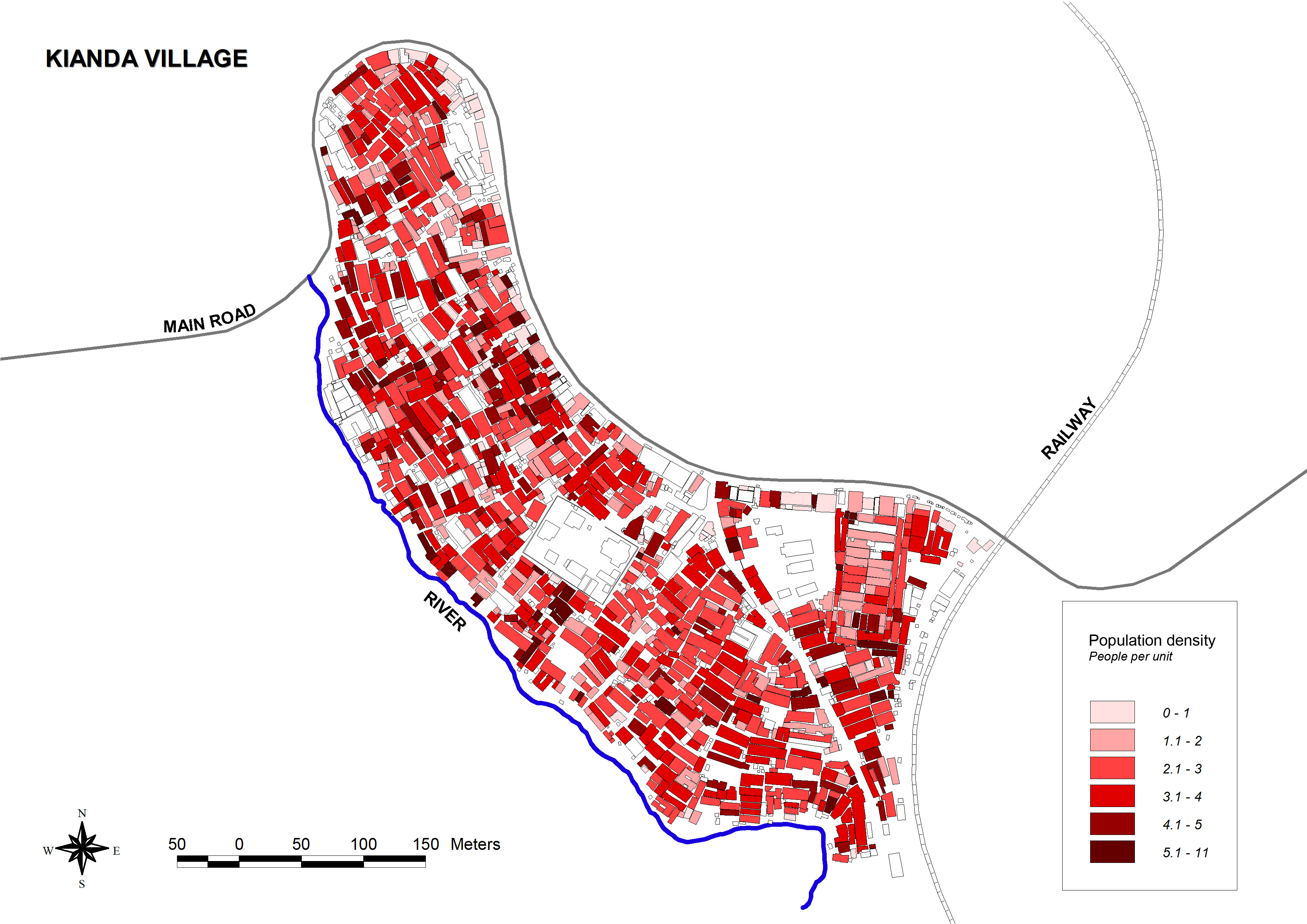
The population density in the Kianda village in western Kibera

The 2009 Kenya Population and Housing Census reported Kibera's population as 170,070. The Kibera slum was previously thought to be one of the biggest informal urban settlements in the world. Several actors had provided and published over the years growing estimations of the size of its population, most of them stating that it was the largest slum in Africa with the number of people there reaching over 1 million. According to Mike Davis, a well known expert on urban slums, Kibera had a population of about 800,000 people.

The International Housing Coalition (IHC) made an estimate of more than half a million people. UN-Habitat had released several estimations ranging between 350,000 and 1 million people. These statistics mainly come out of analysis of aerial pictures of the area. IRIN estimated a population density of 2,000 residents per hectare.

In 2008, an independent team of researchers began a door-by-door survey named "Map Kibera Project" with the aim to map physical and socio-demographic features of the slum. A trained team of locals, after having developed an ad-hoc surveying methodology, has so far gathered census data of over 15,000 people and completed the mapping of 5000 structures, services (public toilets, schools), and infrastructures (drainage system, water and electricity supply) in the village of Kianda. On the basis of data collected in Kianda, the Map Kibera Project team estimated that the whole Kibera slum could be inhabited by a total population ranging from 235,000 to a maximum of 270,000 people, dramatically scaling down all previous figures.

The breakdown of ethnic groups inhabiting Kibera and their gender-specific representation is Luo: 34.9% (male), 35.4% (female); Luyia: 26.5% (male), 32.5% (female); Nubian: 11.6% (male), 9.1% (female); Kikuyu: 7.9% (male), 6.4% (female); Kamba: 7.5% (male), 10.3% (female); Kisii: 6.4% (male), 2.2% (female); Other: 5.2% (male), 4.1% (female)

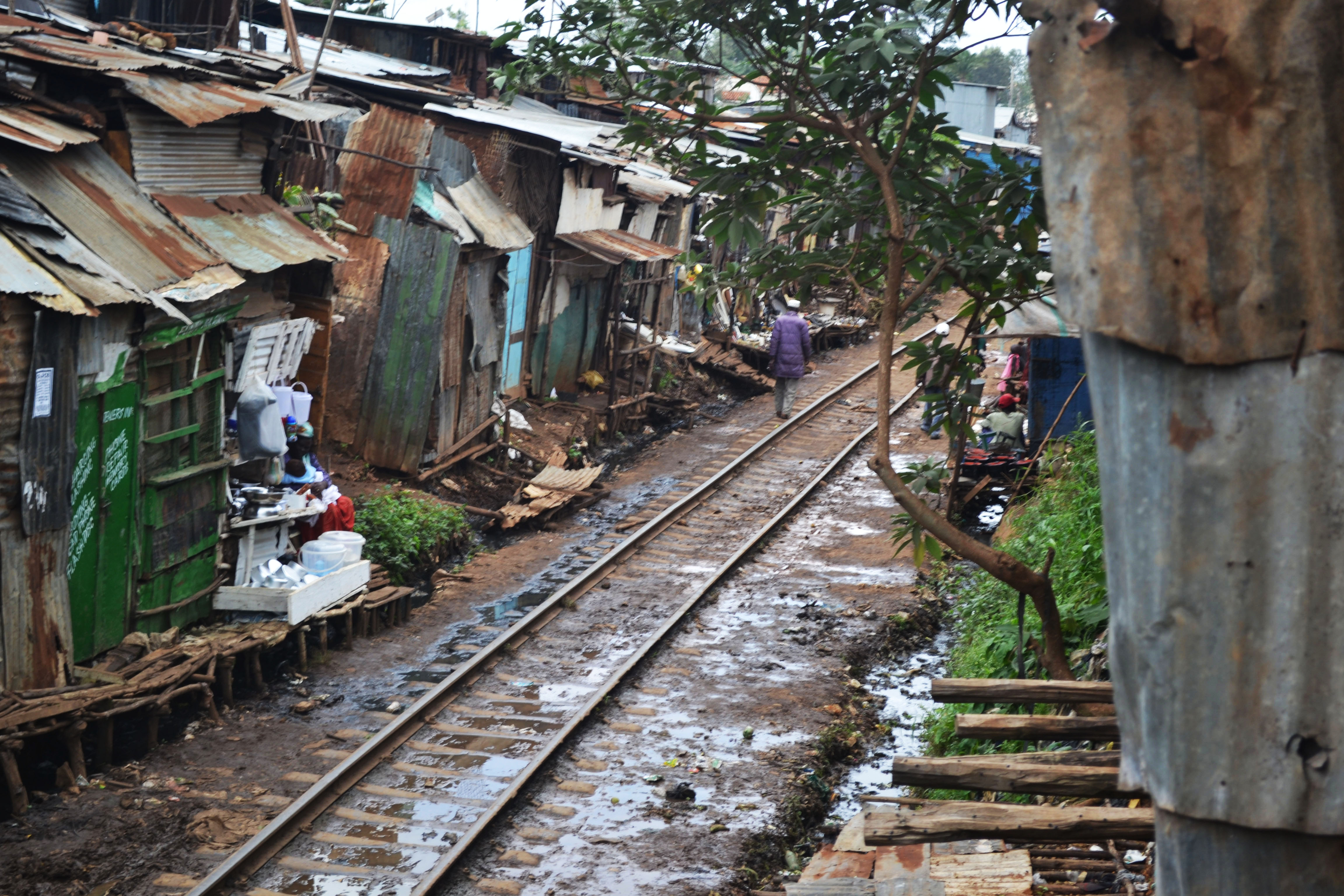
Railway tracks in Kibera, Nairobi, Kenya. The Uganda Railway line linking Mombasa, Nairobi and Kisumu on Lake Victoria began about 1901 under the British colonial empire. In the early 20th century, the British government gave Kenyan soldiers in its regional army the right to live on public land near the railway tracks, leading to the creation of Kibera.

== Infrastructure ==
The Uganda Railway Line passes through the centre of the neighbourhood, providing passengers aboard the train a firsthand view of the slum. Kibera has a railway station, but most residents use buses and matatus to reach the city centre; carjacking, irresponsible driving, and poor traffic law enforcement are chronic issues.

Kibera is heavily polluted by human refuse, garbage, soot, dust, and other wastes. The slum is contaminated with human and animal faeces, due to the open sewage system and the frequent use of "flying toilets". The lack of sanitation combined with poor nutrition among residents accounts for many illnesses and diseases. The Umande Trust, a local NGO, is building communal toilets that generate methane gas (biogas) for local residents.

A community radio station, Pamoja FM, advocates not only upgrading Kibera slum but also all the slums in Nairobi.

Kibera Journal has existed since November 2006. The paper covers issues affecting the people of Kibera, and it has played an important role in training the youth in basic journalism skills that they use to cover issues in their communities.

== Education ==
Most education centres in Kibera are classified as informal, but various initiatives have been underway to add schools. Some start as babycare centres, which later develop into schools. Most are not regulated by the government. Some of the notable schools are Olympic Primary School, one of the leading government schools in the country. Other government (public) schools in Kibera include Kibera Primary School (also called Old Kibera), Ayany Primary School and Toi Primary School. Facing the Future School (FaFu), as well as several church-owned and privately owned schools are also in the area. Notable Secondary schools include PCEA Silanga High School, owned by the Presbyterian Church of East Africa, Raila Educational centre, and Olympic Secondary School, among others. There is the vocational PCEA Emmanuel Technical Training Centre, offering self-employment skills to the residents and the Tunapanda Institute, offering free courses on technology, design and business skills. Several other local youth organisations, such as a football team called the Kibera Black Stars, have also been concerned and involved in educational projects.

== Slum upgrading ==
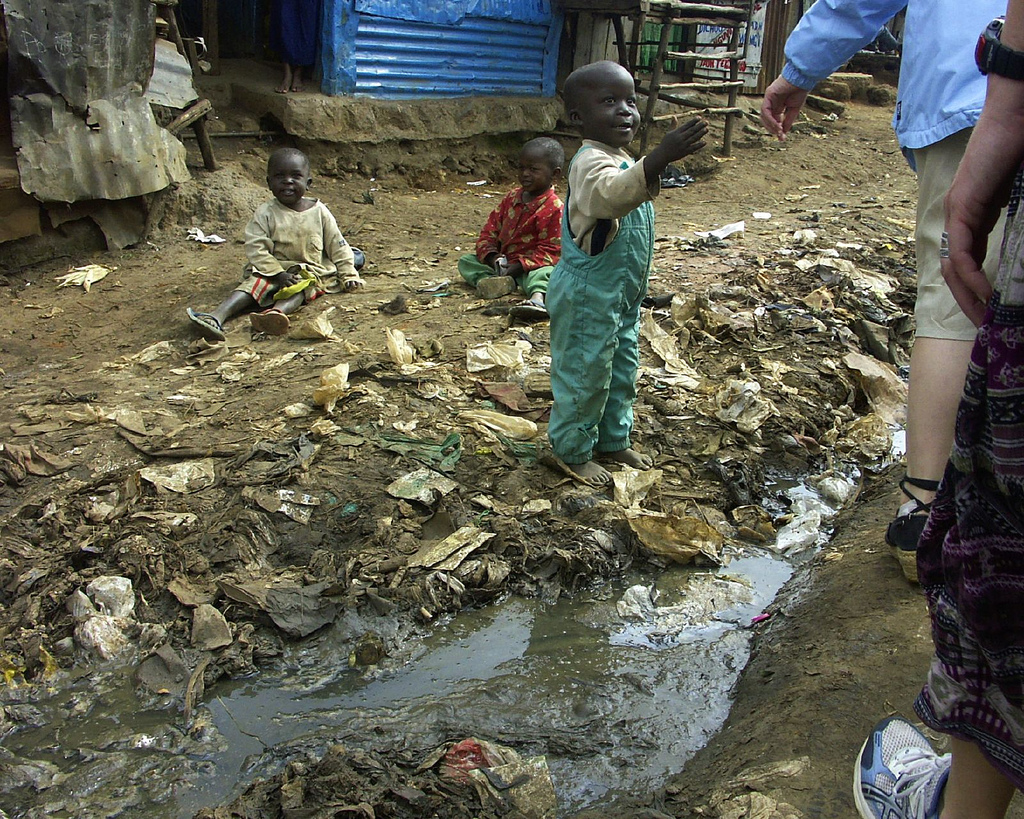
The ground in much of Kibera is composed of refuse and rubbish.

Kibera is one of the most studied slums in Africa, not only because it sits in the centre of the modern city, but also because UN-HABITAT, the United Nations' agency for human settlements, is headquartered close by. Ban Ki-moon visited the settlement within a month of his selection as UN secretary-general.

Kibera, as one of the most pronounced slums within Kenya, is undergoing an intensive slum upgrading process. The government, UN-HABITAT and a contingent of NGOs, notably Maji na Ufanisi, are making inroads into the settlements in an attempt to facelift the housing and sanitary conditions.

There are three significant complicating factors to construction or upgrade within Kibera. The first is the rate of petty and serious crime. Building materials cannot be left unattended for long at any time because there is a very high chance of them being stolen. It is not uncommon for owners of storm-damaged dwellings to have to camp on top of the remnants of their homes until repairs can be made, to protect the raw materials from would-be thieves.

The second is the lack of building foundations. The ground in much of Kibera is literally composed of refuse and rubbish. Dwellings are often constructed atop this unstable ground, and therefore many structures collapse whenever the slum experiences flooding, which it does regularly. This means that even well-constructed buildings are often damaged by the collapse of nearby poorly constructed ones.

The third complicating factor is the unyielding topography and cramped sprawl of the area. Few houses have vehicle access, and many are at the bottoms of steep inclines (which heightens the flooding risk). This means that any construction efforts are made more difficult and costly by the fact that all materials must be brought in by hand.

=== Clearance ===
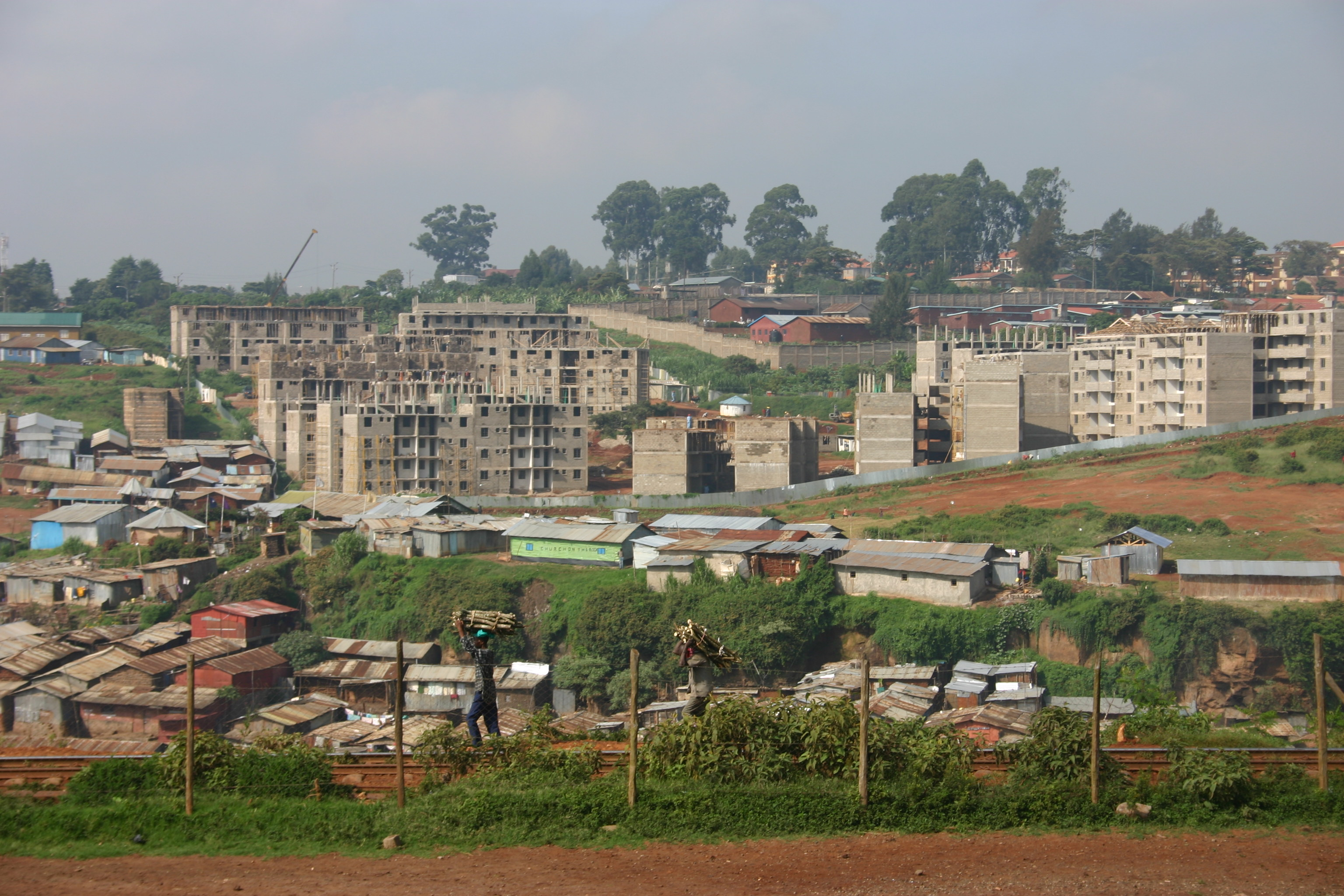
New apartments being built adjacent to Kibera

On 16 September 2009 the Kenyan government, which claims ownership of the land on which Kibera stands, began a long-term movement scheme which will rehouse the people who live in slums in Nairobi.

The clearance of Kibera was expected to take between two and five years to complete. The entire project was planned to take nine years and to rehouse all the slum residents in the city. The project had the backing of the United Nations and former Prime Minister Raila Odinga, who was the area MP, and was expected to cost $1.2 billion. The new communities were planned to include schools, markets, playgrounds and other facilities. The first batch of around 1,500 people to leave the slum were taken away by truck on 16 September 2009 from 6:30 am local time and were rehoused in 300 newly constructed apartments with a monthly rent of around $10.

The project start was postponed several times when Prime Minister Odinga was unavailable to oversee the first day. He was joined on the first day by Housing Minister Soita Shitanda and his assistant Margaret Wanjiru, with all three helping residents to load their belongings onto the trucks. Also present were several dozen armed police officers to oversee the arrangements and to deter any resistance.

The process has been legally challenged by more than 80 people, and the Kenyan High Court has stated that the government cannot begin demolition works until the case is heard in October but will be able to demolish the homes of people who leave voluntarily before then. The 80 plaintiffs are a mixture of middle-class landlords and Kibera residents, and they claim that the land in Kibera is theirs and hence the government has no right to demolish the shacks. The Nubian community, who have lived on the land for nearly 100 years, are also disappointed with the scheme, and one elder has said that the present housing should be improved instead.

The project has also come under fire from urban planners who say that it risks repeating the mistakes of previous schemes, when poor families either shared two-room apartments with one or two other families to pay the rent, or sublet them to middle-class families and moved back into the slums. Workers earning a minimum wage in Kenya make less than US$2 per day. There is also controversy over the timing of the project, with the first phase, rehousing 7,500 people, being delayed by five years and one government official stating that if the project continues at the current pace it will take 1,178 years to complete.

== Arts and photography ==
In the Olympic quarter of Kibera, the House of Friends foundation started to develop the Kibera Arts District, a street where artists working with different materials have their workshops. In public tours, visitors can meet the artists and interact with their art. They also run a gallery called White House and an arts program for children.

A movement of young photographers is trying to shift the narrative about Kibera and put out their own perspective and bring forward, how they see their home: Brian Otieno is the founder of Kibera Stories, Gordwin Odhiambo has created the platform Kiberanet, Jeremiah Onyango created the "Return to Kibra" initiative, and Jimmy Furaha is running Nairobi Kila Siku, a website aiming to archive the daily lived experiences of people in Nairobi, especially in and around Kibera. Together, they have started community engagements through the camera and are working on ways in which people who tell their stories can own their stories.

== References in popular culture ==
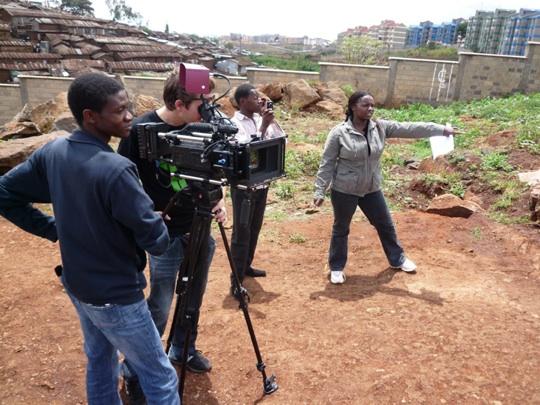
Shooting the feature film Togetherness Supreme in Kibera and with the collaboration of Kibera youth trainees

Kibera is featured in Fernando Meirelles's film The Constant Gardener, which is based on the book of the same name by John le Carré. It is mentioned in the music video "World on Fire" by Sarah McLachlan, which profiled the work of Carolina for Kibera, a grassroots organisation named a Hero of Global Health in 2005 by Time magazine.

Robert Neuwirth devotes a chapter of his book Shadow Cities to Kibera and calls it a squatter community, predicting that places like Kibera, Sultanbeyli in Istanbul, Turkey, and Dharavi in Mumbai, India, are the prototypes of the cities of tomorrow. Among other things, Neuwirth points out that such cities should be reconsidered and not viewed merely as slums, because many locals were drawn to them while escaping far worse conditions in rural areas. Michael Holman's 2005 novel Last Orders at Harrods is based on a fictional version of the slum, called Kireba. Bill Bryson visited Africa for CARE and wrote a companion book called "Bill Bryson's African Diary", which includes a description of his visit to Kibera.

Kibera is the backdrop for the short film Kibera Kid, which featured a cast entirely drawn from residents. It has played in film festivals worldwide including the Berlin Film Festival and won a Student Emmy from Hollywood. Recently, Hot Sun Foundation and Hot Sun Films started the first film school in the slum, the Kibera Film School. The school teaches the youth from the slum how to make films and tell their stories. In 2009 through 2010, the Kibera Film School and Hot Sun Foundation collaborated on the feature follow-up to Kibera Kid, which is titled Togetherness Supreme.

In his documentary Living with Corruption, Sorious Samura stayed with a family in Kibera to film the corruption that occurs even at the lowest levels of Kenyan society. Furthermore, Kibera is portrayed in the Austrian 2007 documentary Über Wasser: Menschen und gelbe Kanister.

In 2011, the BBC aired a reality show documentary TV program called Rich, Famous and in the Slums about Kibera. The program showed four famous and rich people, after working at the worst jobs available in the slums, moving in with four local impoverished families and getting to meet the actual conditions in which they live. They were:

- A single mother away from her two children, supporting them and her parents through prostitution.
- A family of young orphans living in horrible conditions.
- A single mother of 6, with HIV, who owned a small beauty salon and volunteers as a community health care person.
- A 20 year old newcomer to Kibera, one of many pouring in from other parts of Kenya hoping to find a job in Nairobi.

The Economist published an article in 2012 suggesting that Kibera "may be the most entrepreneurial place on the planet" and that "to equate slums with idleness and misery is to misunderstand them".

The 2014 novel Bingo's Run by James A. Levine features a 15-year-old from Kibera.

The 2015 Netflix series Sense8 features a character named Capheus Onyango, based in Kibera, showing the hardships of a fictional matatu driver there.

== See also ==
- Kibera Soccer FC
- List of slums
- List of slums in Kenya
- Kawangware – Nairobi slum
- Kiambiu – Nairobi slum
- Kicoshep – NGO based in Kibera
- Korogocho – Nairobi slum
- Mathare – Nairobi slum
- Mukuru slums – Nairobi slum
- Matopeni – slum on the outskirts of Nairobi
- Majengo – slum on the outskirts of Nairobi
- Toi Market
- Community Support Group
