= Embakasi Pipeline =

Area of Embakasi in Nairobi, Kenya

Pipeline
- Location of Pipeline in Kenya
- Coordinates: 01°19′10″S 36°53′46″E
- Country: Kenya
- County: Nairobi City
- Sub-county: Embakasi

Pipeline is a slum-like neighbourhood in Embakasi in the city of Nairobi in Kenya. Located within the larger Eastlands area of Nairobi, it is approximately 9.5 kilometres (5.9 mi) east of the central business district. It has earned a reputation for its poor infrastructure, coupled with overcrowded flats, narrow streets, littering, as well as its poor drainage system.

== Location ==
Pipeline is located approximately 9.5 kilometres (5.9 mi) southeast of Nairobi's central business district, west of the Outer Ring Road within the Eastlands area in Embakasi. It borders another slum, Mukuru kwa Njenga, other low-income to low middle-income such as Fedha and Kware, and the middle class suburb of Imara Daima. Electorally, Pipeline is placed under Embakasi South Constituency; the whole constituency is within the Embakasi Sub-county.

== Overview ==
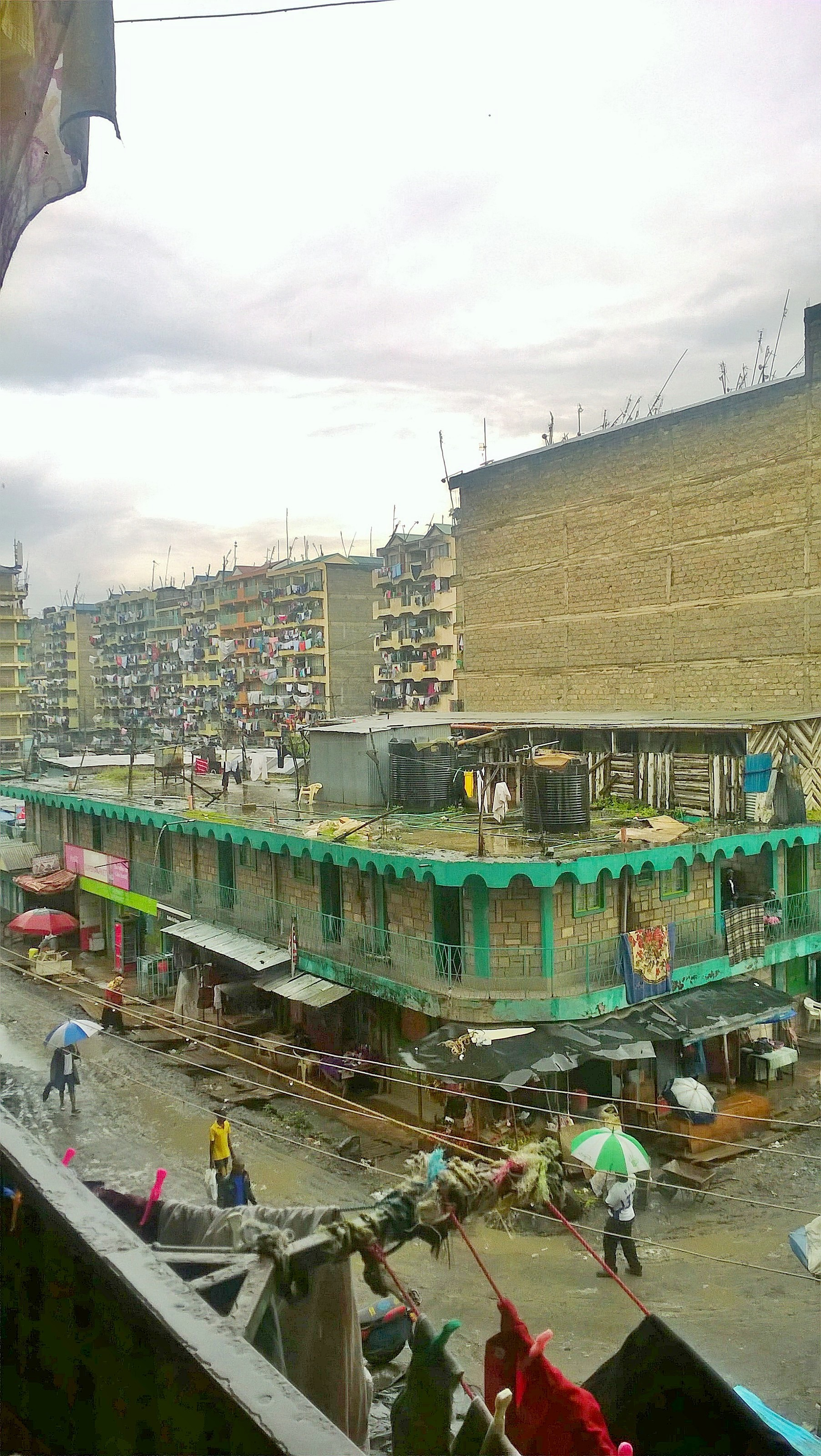
A section of Pipeline Estate

Pipeline Estate has over the years become synonymous with a concrete slum for its poor infrastructure and uncontrolled tenements. Overcrowded high-rises set up side by side define the estate's skyline, narrow streets, poor drainage systems and poor garbage collection. The estate attracts low-income earners because of its affordability. The neighbourhood has seldom set aside open spaces that can be used for recreation, expansion of roads and development of social amenities. As space in Pipeline ran out, uncontrolled development spread out to the neighbouring poorer Kware Estate. The neighbourhood population is alarmingly high, accommodating approximately 100,000 residents without a single public primary school.

As of 2019, Pipeline together with Kware have a population of 166,517, with 87,056 of them being male and 79,439 being female. The neighbourhood has a population density of 106,445/km^{2} in a land area of 1.6 km^{2}, the highest after Huruma and Madiwa.
