= List of city districts by population density =

This is a list of the most densely populated city subdivisions with over 30,000 inhabitants per square kilometre (78,000/sq mi) in the world with an area of at least 1 km^{2}. Most are districts of large cities and may vary significantly in regional importance. Note this list is not exhaustive as data is hard to come by for many places on earth.

== List ==
Subdivision	City	Country	Inhabitants per km^{2}	Population	Area (km^{2})	Notes
Imbaba	Giza	Egypt	177,038	1,465,875	8.28	
Lalbagh Thana	Dhaka	Bangladesh	168,151	369,933	2.2	
Ajeromi-Ifelodun	Lagos	Nigeria	150,689	2,094,583	13.90	
Mushin	Lagos	Nigeria	137,263	1,928,542	14.05	
Lagos Island	Lagos	Nigeria	135,509	1,254,812	9.26	
Chowk Bazaar	Dhaka	Bangladesh	130,122	156,147	1.2	
Zaveri Bazar	Mumbai	India	114,001	202,922	1.8	
St. Anthony Parish	Macau	China	111,636	122,800	1.1	
Karanj	Surat	India	107,288	198,482	1.85	
Shomolu	Lagos	Nigeria	102,466	1,496,003	14.60	
Dhaka Kotwali Thana	Dhaka	Bangladesh	101,693	210,504	2.07	
Agege	Lagos	Nigeria	88,682	1,507,591	17.00	
Khánh Hội	Ho Chi Minh City	Vietnam	88,324	94,507	1.07	
Vườn Lài	Ho Chi Minh City	Vietnam	81,309	104,076	1.28	
Zafer, Bahçelievler	Istanbul	Turkey	78,772	85,464	1.1	
San Andres Bukid	Manila	Philippines	76,400	128,499	1.68	
Sutrapur Thana	Dhaka	Bangladesh	70,202	307,483	4.38	
Tondo District	Manila	Philippines	69,297	630,604	9.1	
Surulere	Lagos	Nigeria	68,751	1,859,727	27.05	
50. Yıl	Istanbul	Turkey	68,662	75,528	1.1	
Hillbrow	Johannesburg	South Africa	68,418	74,131	1.08	
Limbayat	Surat	India	67,769	91,488	1.35	
Bijam	Shubra El Kheima	Egypt	65,622	435,076	6.63	
West Point	Monrovia	Liberia	65,000	34,605	0.53	
Dadar	Mumbai	India	64,168	582,007	9.1	
Eastleigh South, Kiambiu	Nairobi	Kenya	63,777	66,264	1.04	
Cầu Kiệu	Ho Chi Minh City	Vietnam	63,411	77,995	1.23	
An Đông	Ho Chi Minh City	Vietnam	61,537	81,229	1.32	
Yorkville	New York City	United States	65,829	84,046	1.27	
Byculla	Mumbai	India	59,505	440,335	7.4	
Sagrampura	Surat	India	59,020	77,316	1.31	
Kayole	Nairobi	Kenya	58,655	140,321	2.39	
Minh Phụng	Ho Chi Minh City	Vietnam	58,629	74,459	1.27	
Şirinevler	Istanbul	Turkey	58,354	64,189	1.1	
Grant Road	Mumbai	India	57,744	382,841	6.6	
Hoàn Kiếm	Hanoi	Vietnam	55,002	105,604	1.92	
Văn Miếu - Quốc Tử Giám	Hanoi	Vietnam	55,131	105,301	1.91	
Vĩnh Hội	Ho Chi Minh City	Vietnam	53,859	63,015	1.17	
Sultangazi	Istanbul	Turkey	53,457	534,565	10	
Karadeniz	Istanbul	Turkey	52,339	73,274	1.4	
Fulpada	Surat	India	52,146	169,476	3.25	
Kwun Tong District	Hong Kong	China	51,104	562,427	11.27	
Fındıklı	Istanbul	Turkey	50,993	61,192	1.2	
Patio Bonito	Bogotá	Colombia	50,168	159,033	3.17	
Demirkapı	Istanbul	Turkey	49,948	54,943	1.1	
Kanarya	Istanbul	Turkey	49,631	69,484	1.4	
La Sagrada Família	Barcelona	Spain	49,040	51,539	1.05	
Kurla	Mumbai	India	49,006	778,218	15.9	
Mehmet Akif, Küçükçekmece	Istanbul	Turkey	48,913	53,804	1.1	
Malé Island	Malé	Maldives	47,870	103,693	1.952	
Motijheel Thana	Dhaka	Bangladesh	47,692	307,483	4.69	
İstiklal, Ümraniye	Istanbul	Turkey	47,503	47,503	1	
Our Lady Fatima Parish	Macau	China	47,000	126,000	2.7	
Lagos Mainland	Lagos	Nigeria	46,820	918,609	19.62	
Wong Tai Sin District	Hong Kong	China	46,197	444,630	9.3	
Elphinstone	Mumbai	India	45,793	457,931	10.0	
Centro Habana	Havana	Cuba	44,560	152,395	3.42	
Dandora 'B'	Nairobi	Kenya	43,918	85,569	1.95	
La Nova Esquerra de l'Eixample	Barcelona	Spain	43,490	58,180	1.34	
Huangpu District	Shanghai	China	43,425	538,900	12.41	
El Raval	Barcelona	Spain	43,340	47,608	1.10	
Yau Tsim Mong District	Hong Kong	China	43,168	282,020	6.99	
Karachi Central	Karachi	Pakistan	43,000	2,972,639	69	
Khar	Mumbai	India	42,929	580,835	13.5	
San Francisco	Bogotá	Colombia	42,523	76,117	1.79	
Manhattan Community Board 7	New York City	United States	42,387	207,699	4.90	
Tandale	Dar es Salaam	Tanzania	42,314	44,853	1.06	
Manhattan Community Board 8	New York City	United States	42,312	217,063	5.13	
Gran Britalia	Bogotá	Colombia	42,119	75,814	1.8	
Kowloon City	Hong Kong	China	41,999	418,732	9.97	
La Villette	Paris	France	41,718	53,650	1.29	
Malad	Mumbai	India	41,651	796,775	19.1	
Güngören	Istanbul	Turkey	41,349	289,441	7	
Yonghe District	New Taipei	Taiwan	41,139	235,059	5.71	
Anjana	Surat	India	41,108	78,344	1.91	
Gaziosmanpaşa	Istanbul	Turkey	40,997	491,962	12	
Cumhuriyet, Küçükçekmece	Istanbul	Turkey	40,882	53,147	1.3	
Roquette	Paris	France	40,546	47,520	1.17	
Nanpura	Surat	India	40,429	51,749	1.28	
Matunga	Mumbai	India	40,400	524,393	13.0	
Katargam Gotalawadi	Surat	India	40,057	70,500	1.76	
Güneşli	Istanbul	Turkey	39,967	47,960	1.2	
11th arrondissement	Paris	France	39,567	145,208	3.67	
Chittagong Kotwali Thana	Chittagong	Bangladesh	39,566	246,893	6.24	
Oshodi-Isolo	Lagos	Nigeria	39,440	1,655,691	41.98	
Bosa Occidental	Bogotá	Colombia	39,424	169,523	4.3	
Sham Shui Po	Hong Kong	China	39,262	353,550	9.35	
Clignancourt	Paris	France	39,243	64,868	1.65	
Manzese	Dar es Salaam	Tanzania	38,914	66,543	1.71	
İnönü, Küçükçekmece	Istanbul	Turkey	38,849	73,813	1.9	
Yunus Emre, Sultangazi	Istanbul	Turkey	38,324	49,821	1.3	
Gümüşpala	Istanbul	Turkey	38,254	42,079	1.1	
La Vila de Gràcia	Barcelona	Spain	38,210	50,662	1.33	
Minuto de Dios	Bogotá	Colombia	38,023	141,825	3.73	
El Rincón	Bogotá	Colombia	37,749	268,018	7.1	
Bronx Community Board 5	New York City	United States	37,736	136,982	3.63	
Sants	Barcelona	Spain	37,460	41,127	1.10	
Makurumla	Dar es Salaam	Tanzania	37,200	53,568	1.44	
Kocasinan	Istanbul	Turkey	37,041	74,081	2	
100. Yıl	Istanbul	Turkey	37,018	48,123	1.3	
Manhattan Community Board 3	New York City	United States	36,054	164,407	4.56	
Süvari	Ankara	Turkey	35,972	35,972	1	
Bahçelievler	Istanbul	Turkey	35,945	611,059	17	
Kariobangi North	Nairobi	Kenya	35,778	39,342	1.10	
Yıldırım	Istanbul	Turkey	35,543	53,315	1.5	
Esentepe, Sultangazi	Istanbul	Turkey	35,444	63,799	1.8	
Grandes-Carrières	Paris	France	35,232	67,152	1.91	
Armağanevler	Istanbul	Turkey	35,010	38,511	1.1	
Recoleta	Buenos Aires	Argentina	34,959	188,780	5.4	
El Carmel	Barcelona	Spain	34,812	32,724	0.94	
San Lorenzo	Naples	Italy	34,701	49,275	1.42	
Balvanera	Buenos Aires	Argentina	34,590	152,198	4.4	
L'Antiga Esquerra de l'Eixample	Barcelona	Spain	34,254	42,284	1.23	
Almagro	Buenos Aires	Argentina	33,966	138,942	4.1	
Picpus	Paris	France	33,788	62,947	1.86	
Hongkou District	Shanghai	China	33,267	781,100	23.48	
Eastern District	Hong Kong	China	33,004	616,199	18.7	
Saiyadpura	Surat	India	32,650	55,179	1.69	
20th arrondissement	Paris	France	32,607	194,994	5.98	
Les Corts	Barcelona	Spain	32,570	46,009	1.41	
Umoja 'II'	Nairobi	Kenya	32,473	101,477	3.13	
Mohammadpur Thana	Dhaka	Bangladesh	32,439	241,343	7.44	
Bağcılar	Istanbul	Turkey	32,397	745,125	23	
Épinettes	Paris	France	32,186	44,352	1.38	
Malazgirt, Sincan	Ankara	Turkey	35,289	32,081	1.1	
Grenelle	Paris	France	32,078	47,411	1.48	
Plaisance	Paris	France	32,061	57,229	1.78	
18th arrondissement	Paris	France	32,024	192,468	6.01	
Xuanwu District	Beijing	China	31,879	526,000	16.50	
Altıntepe	Istanbul	Turkey	31,411	31,411	1	
Sant Andreu	Barcelona	Spain	31,061	57,183	1.84	
Chamberí	Madrid	Spain	31,029	145,934	4.69	
Atapark	Ankara	Turkey	30,964	49,542	1.6	
Selçuklu	Ankara	Turkey	30,775	33,853	1.1	
Choa Chu Kang	Singapore	Singapore	30,700	187,550	6.11	
Plevne	Ankara	Turkey	30,647	30,647	1	
Bayrampaşa	Istanbul	Turkey	30,526	274,735	9	
Gatina	Nairobi	Kenya	30,411	45,872	1.51	
Gençosman	Istanbul	Turkey	30,473	39,615	1.3	
Breña	Lima	Peru	30,405	97,906	3.22	
Zyablikovo	Moscow	Russia	30,394	133,096	4.38	
Amérique	Paris	France	30,155	55,365	1.84	
Combat	Paris	France	30,107	38,988	1.29	
Mwiki	Ruiru	Kenya	30,107	44,760	1.49	
Charonne	Paris	France	30,082	62,901	2.09	
Novokosino	Moscow	Russia	30,056	108,204	3.60	
Talatpaşa, Kağıthane	Istanbul	Turkey	30,008	33,009	1.1	

== See also ==
- List of cities proper by population density
- List of countries and dependencies by population density
- Kowloon Walled City – the now-razed extremely dense "fortress city" district in Hong Kong.
- Begich Towers – a 1956 condo, housing most of the town of Whittier, Alaska.

== Barangays ==
At least a dozen barangays have population densities over 200,000 people per square km, which are very small sections or neighborhoods (not city districts) within Manila, with the highest that of Barangay 717 at 277,007.3 people per square km.
