= Kware, Nairobi =

Slum neighbourhood in Embakasi, Nairobi, Kenya

Kware
- Location of Kware in Kenya
- Coordinates: 1°18′52″S 36°53′17″E
- Country: Kenya
- County: Nairobi City
- Sub-county: Embakasi

Kware is a slum neighbourhood in Embakasi within the city of Nairobi. Located in the larger Eastlands area of Nairobi, it is approximately 9 kilometres (5.6 mi) east of the central business district. It borders the Mukuru slums.Initially, Kware was predominantly an informal settlement but over the years part Kware and Pipeline have earned a reputation for their poor infrastructure, coupled with overcrowded flats, narrow streets, littering, as well as its poor drainage system.

== Overview ==
Kware is located approximately 9 kilometres (5.6 mi) southeast of Nairobi's central business district, west of the Outer Ring Road within the Eastlands area in Embakasi. Kware, a mispronounced version of 'quarry', got its name from a nearby quarry site. It borders the Mukuru and Pipeline slums. Electorally, Kware is placed under Embakasi South Constituency; the whole constituency is within the Embakasi Sub-county. Kware is also an electoral ward within the constituency.

As of 2019, Kware together with Pipeline have a population of 166,517, with 87,056 of them being male and 79,439 being female. The neighbourhood has a population density of 106,445/km^{2} in a land area of 1.6km^{2}, the highest after Huruma.
