= Mama Victor =

Kenyan activist

- Born: Benna Baluma
- Died: 2024 (aged 52); Mathare, Nairobi, Kenya

Mama Victor, born Benna Baluma, was a Kenyan activist known for her work against police brutality.

== Life ==
She worked for six years as a casual domestic worker in Eastleigh, a suburban area near to her neighborhood, Mathare, in Nairobi. In August 2017, two of her sons, Victor and Benard (aged 24 and 22), were killed in post-election extrajudicial police executions in Mathare. This led the Mathare Social Justice Center to contact Mama Victor while they were documenting extrajudicial violence in Mathare.

From there, she became actively involved in the Center, founding and eventually serving as the coordinator for the Mothers of Victims and Survivors Network. During her tenure as a primary organizer, the collective broadened its influence throughout various Nairobi neighborhoods, such as Kayole, Mukuru, Kasarani, Kibera, Kariobangi, and Dandora. Mama Victor also supported the network's court solidarity and the Embu protest. The Mothers of Victims and Survivors Network documented her and other families' and victims' stories in its 2021 report, featuring how they became community defenders.

In 2024, aged 52, she was killed by floods that devastated Mathare, killing over 40 people in one night.
