= Embakasi Constituency =

Former electoral constituency in Kenya

Embakasi
- Former constituency for the Parliament of Kenya
- Province: Nairobi
- Area: 208 km^{2} (80.3 sq mi)

Former constituency
- Created: 1963
- Abolished: 2013
- Number of members: One
- Replaced by: Embakasi Central, Embakasi East, Embakasi North, Embakasi South, Embakasi West and Kasarani

Embakasi Constituency (formerly known as Nairobi East Constituency) is a former electoral constituency in Kenya. It was one of eight constituencies of Nairobi Province. It consisted of eastern and southeastern suburbs of Nairobi. With 164,227 registered voters, it was the most populous constituency in Kenya. It covered most of the Eastlands part of Nairobi. Embakasi constituency had common boundaries with Embakasi Division. The entire constituency was located within Nairobi City Council area. The constituency had an area of 208 km^{2}.

The division has since been split into Embakasi South Constituency, Embakasi North Constituency, Embakasi Central Constituency, Embakasi East Constituency, and Embakasi West Constituency; Two of its regions, Njiru and Ruai were hived off from Embakasi Constituency and combined with Kasarani Constituency.

== Members of Parliament ==
Elections	MP	Party	Notes
1963	John David Kali	KANU	
1966	B. Mwangi Karungaru	KANU	One-party system
1969	B. Mwangi Karungaru	KANU	One-party system
1974	Godfrey Muhuri Muchiri	KANU	One-party system
1976	Ezra H. Njoka	KANU	By-Election, One-party system
1979	Ezra H. Njoka	KANU	One-party system
1983	Godfrey Muhuri Muchiri	KANU	One-party system
1988	David Mwenje	KANU	One-party system
1992	Henry Ruhiu	FORD-Asili	
1997	David Mwenje	Democratic Party	
2002	David Mwenje	NARC	
2007	Mugabe Were	ODM	Killed in January 2008
2008	Ferdinand Waititu	PNU	By-election (June 10)

== Mugabe Were ==
In the early morning hours of January 27, 2008, the Member of Parliament for Embakasi Constituency, Mugabe Were, was shot dead by two gunmen near Kifaru Primary School. According to news reports, Mugabe had just arrived at his compound when the gunmen attacked him while still in his car, before the gate could be opened. Mugabe was elected as a member of the Orange Democratic Movement, Kenya's opposition party. Speculation as to whether or not this was a political assassination already surrounds the killing. If so, this would mark a new stage in the continuing crisis over the disputed presidential election of December 27, 2007.

== Locations and wards ==
Locations
Location	Population*
Dandora	154,157
Embakasi	32,027
Kariobangi South	24,528
Bububuru	28,345
Kayole	137,866
Mukuru kwa Njenga	86,697
Njiru	25,251
Ruai	17,531
Umoja	137,866
Total	615,923
1999 census.

Wards
Ward	Registered Voters
Dandora A	17,223
Dandora B	21,735
Embakasi / Mihang'o	13,322
Kariobangi South	8,589
Kayole	27,506
Komarock	9,413
Mukuru	22,060
Njiru / Mwiki	7,705
Ruai	5,944
Savanna	10,149
Umoja	20,581
Total	164,227
*September 2005.
