= Uthiru =

Suburb of Nairobi, Kenya

- Suburb
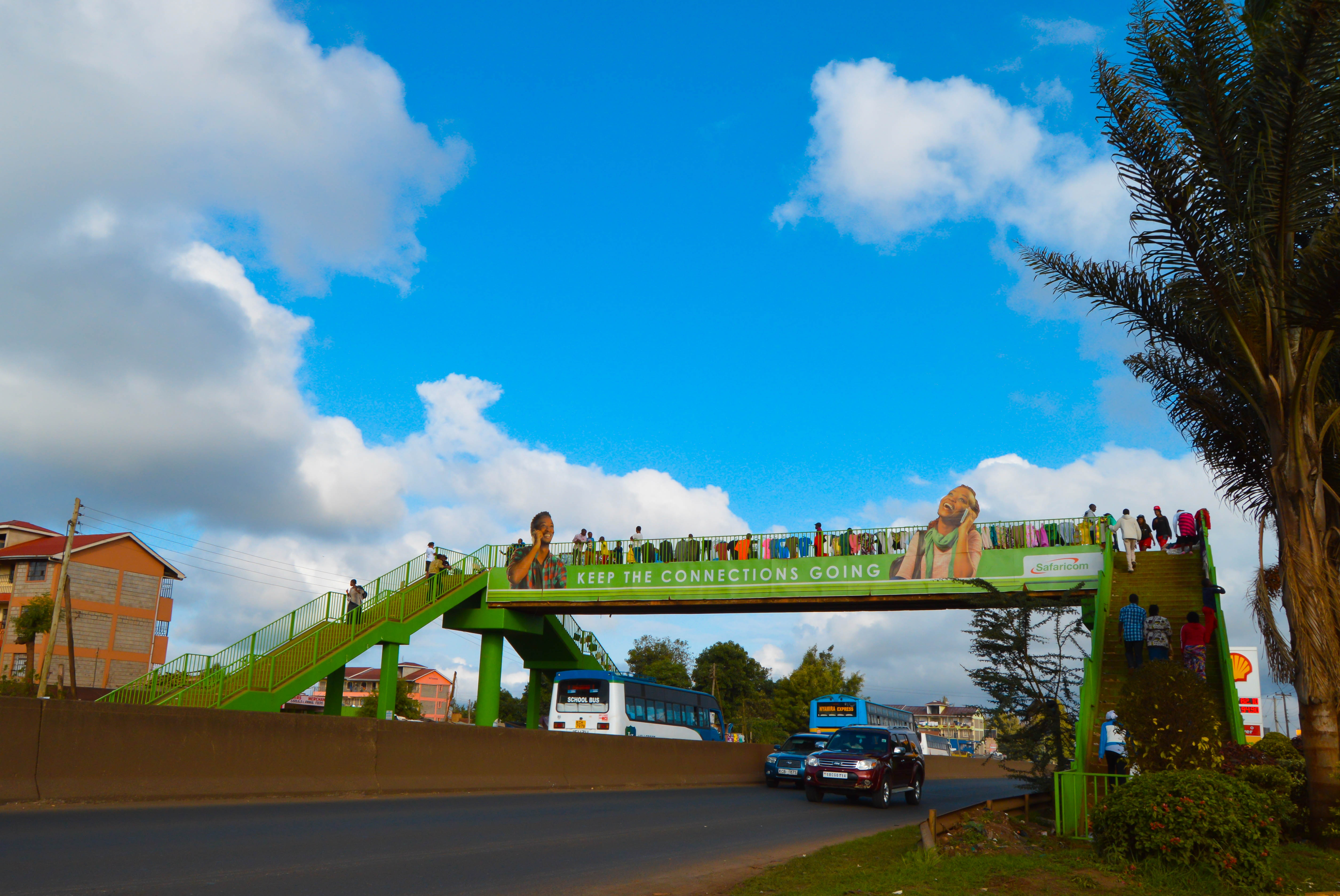
- A cross-highway bridge in Uthiru (2012)
- Interactive map of Uthiru
- Coordinates: 1°16′27.99″S 36°42′10.26″E
- Country: Kenya
- County: Kiambu and Nairobi City counties
- Time zone: UTC+3:00 (EAT)

Uthiru is a settlement transversing in both Nairobi County and Kiambu County on the northwest side of the city centre of Nairobi. It is located between Kikuyu and Kangemi. The number of residents likely exceeds 100,000. It hosts a number of public institutions including University of Nairobi, Upper Kabete Campus, Kabete national polytechnic, and AHITI Kabete. ILRI (International Livestock Research Institute) has its headquarters in Uthiru.

Kinoo Deanery of the Anglican Church of Kenya is divided into Kinoo, Muthiga, Uthiru, and Kiuru Parishes. It belongs to Uthiru Archdeaconry of The Diocese of Mount Kenya South. St Stephen Catholic Church exists in Uthiru.

== Educational Institutions ==
- Uthiru Genesis School,
- Creative Bestcare Junior School,
- Cedar Grove Junior Academy,
- Uthiru Girls High School, and
- Uthiru High School exist.

== See also ==
- Githurai
- Huruma
- Kawangware
- Kiambiu
- Kibera
- Korogocho
- Mathare
- Muirigo
- Mukuru kwa Njenga
