= Imara Daima =

Area of Nairobi, Kenya

- Location of Imara Daima in Kenya
- Coordinates: 1°16′9″S 36°44′20″E
- Country: Kenya
- County: Nairobi City
- Sub-county: Embakasi

Area
  - Total: 0.77 sq mi (2 km^{2})

Population (2019)
  - Total: 52,837
  - Density: 67,100/sq mi (25,920/km^{2})
- Time zone: UTC+3

Imara Daima is a middle class neighbourhood in the city of Nairobi. It is approximately 8.2 kilometres (5.1 mi) south of the central business district of Nairobi. Located along the Nairobi expressway and Mombasa Road, the neighbourhood is well connected to transport infrastructure. It has a railway stop that connects to the city center, machakos county and other neighbourhoods.

Imara Daima is divided into 8 middle-class boroughs I.e Imara Daima Estate, Muimara Estate, Villa Franca Estate, Sunrise Estate, Imara Daima phase 2, AA Estate, Mastermind & Maziwa Area.

== Overview ==
Imara Daima is zoned as a mixed residential development neighbourhood. Home to the middle-class segment of Nairobi residents, the estate is predominantly characterised by gated neighbourhoods with maisonettes and bungalows, roofed with maroon tiles. It is a sharp contrast of the neighbouring Mukuru and Pipeline slums. Other housing developments also found in Imara Daima are flats. The larger Imara Daima neighbourhood, especially along the Mombasa Road and Tegla Lorupe Road, is mixed-use with the commercial and industrial sector. Kenya Television Network HQ is also there.

Imara Daima ward, an electoral division within Embakasi South Constituency borrows its name from the estate. The ward covers the estate to the south of Nairobi City County.

As of 2019, Imara Daima had a population of 52,837, with 26,954 of them being male and 25,879 being female. The neighbourhood had a population density of 25,920/km^{2} in a land area of 2 km^{2}.
