= Utawala =

Neighbourhood in Kenya

- Location of Utawala in Kenya
- Coordinates: 1°17′22″S 36°57′44″E
- Country: Kenya
- County: Nairobi City and Machakos
- Sub-county: Embakasi and Athi River

Utawala is a neighbourhood located along the border of Nairobi and Machakos counties. It is approximately 16 kilometres (9.9 mi) southeast of the central business district of Nairobi.

== Location ==
Utawala is located approximately 16 kilometres (9.9 mi) east of Nairobi's central business district. It is lies along the Nairobi Eastern Bypass Highway, and borders, Mihang'o to the north and Ruai to the south. Utawala is a transregional neighbourhood domiciled in both Nairobi's Embakasi area and Machakos County's Athi River Sub-county.

== Overview ==
Utawala is generally mixed-use neighbourhood in Nairobi. It has a mixture of mid-rises and single-family homes and is home to low-income to middle-income earners.

Utawala Ward, an electoral division within Embakasi East Constituency, borrows its name from the estate and covers the area of the neighbourhood within the Nairobi boundaries. The portion of the neighbourhood is in Athi River Sub-county which has similar boundaries with Mavoko Constituency.
