= Kayole =

Low-income neighbourhood in Nairobi, Kenya

- Location of Kayole in Kenya
- Coordinates: 01°16′04″S 36°54′09″E
- Country: Kenya
- County: Nairobi City
- Sub-county: Embakasi and Njiru

Area
  - Total: 1.3 sq mi (3.4 km^{2})

Population (2019)
  - Total: 189,189
  - Density: 140,000/sq mi (56,000/km^{2})

Kayole is a low-income neighbourhood in the city of Nairobi. Located within the larger Eastlands area of Nairobi, it is approximately 11 kilometres (6.8 mi) east of the central business district.

== Location ==
Kayole is located approximately 11 kilometres (6.8 mi) east of Nairobi's central business district, straddled by Kangundo Road to the south, within the Eastlands area in Embakasi. It borders other low-income neighbourhoods such as Donholm, Njiru, Saika and Umoja. Electorally, Kayole is placed under Embakasi Central Constituency; the whole constituency is within the Embakasi and Njiru sub-counties.

== Overview ==
Kayole is generally a low-income, high-density, mixed-use neighbourhood located in Nairobi's Eastlands area. It encompasses other smaller neighbourhoods such as Sabasaba and Kayole-Soweto. Due to its affordability, Kayole hosts low-income earners, holding a significant percentage of the city's population. The neighbourhood exhibits characteristics of a slum; has a mix of storey buildings as well as slum-like structures especially in Kayole-Soweto slum to the south. A significant number of residents in Kayole are unemployed, live in abject poverty, and can barely raise $1 a day.

In terms of security, Kayole is riddled with criminal gangs, kidnappings, armed and aggravated robberies, theft, as well as child trafficking. With a significant number of crimes committed by female perpetrators. The criminal gangs are distinct from other gangs in neighbourhoods such as: Mathare, Huruma, Dandora and Eastleigh. Reports of extra-judicial killings by law enforcement in Kayole are also high.

As of 2019, Kayole has a population of 189,189, with 70,461 of them being residents of Kayole North, 118,728 in Kayole Central and Kayole South.
