= Mihang'o =

Neighbourhood in Nairobi, Kenya

- Location of Mihang'o in Kenya
- Coordinates: 1°16′35″S 36°57′34″E
- Country: Kenya
- County: Nairobi City
- Sub-county: Njiru

Area
  - Total: 4.2 sq mi (11 km^{2})

Population (2019)
  - Total: 60,367
  - Density: 14,190/sq mi (5,478/km^{2})

Mihang'o is a neighbourhood in the city of Nairobi. It is approximately 16 kilometres (9.9 mi) southeast of the central business district of Nairobi.

== Location ==
Mihang'o is located approximately 16 kilometres (9.9 mi) east of Nairobi's central business district. It lies along the Nairobi Eastern Bypass Highway, and borders, Utawala, Njiru and Ruai.

== Overview ==
Mihang'o is generally a residential neighbourhood in Nairobi with some mixed-use features. It has a mixture of mid-rises and single-family homes and is home to low-income to middle-income earners.

As of 2019, Mihang'o has a population of 60,367, with 28,428 of them being male and 31,937 being female. The neighbourhood has a population density of 5478/km^{2} in a land area of 11 km^{2}.

Mihango Ward, an electoral division within Embakasi East Constituency. It borrows its name from the estate and covers the neighbourhood area.
