= Nyayo Estate =

Gated community in Embakasi, Nairobi, Kenya

Nyayo
- Gated community
- Location of Nyayo in Kenya
- Coordinates: 1°18′27″S 36°54′22″E
- Country: Kenya
- County: Nairobi City
- Sub-county: Embakasi
- Development began: 1999
- Time zone: UTC+3
- Website: nyayo.co.ke/the-estate/

Nyayo Estate is a gated neighbourhood in Embakasi in the city of Nairobi. It is approximately 18 kilometres (11 mi) by road southeast of the central business district of Nairobi. Built from 1999, with six phases by 2014, it is the largest housing project in Kenya and second largest in Africa.

== Location ==
Nyayo Estate is located approximately 18 kilometres (11 mi) by road southeast of Nairobi's central business district. It borders the Fedha and Tassia neighbourhoods.

== Overview ==
Nyayo Estate is the second largest residential neighbourhood in Africa after Gwarimpa Estate in Nigeria. The estate was conceptualised by national government in 1998, through the National Social Security Fund (NSSF), targeting the middle-class segment. Building of Phase 1 began in 1999. Nyayo has a total of six phases, with over 4,700 units of semi-detached three bedroom maisonettes and apartments; complemented with nursery and primary schools, and shopping centres. The estate houses over 30,000 residents.

Despite the well developed infrastructure as well as good management, the gated community has often suffered with water shortage often effected by water rationing. Water in the estate is primarily distributed by the Nairobi Water and Sewerage Company (NCWSC) as well as some boreholes that have been sunk within the estate.

Nyayo Estate is considered the safest and cleanest estate to live in Kenya, due to its strict adherence to residency guidelines.
