= Njiru, Nairobi =

Njiru
- Location of Njiru in Kenya
- Coordinates: 01°14′56″S 36°55′39″E
- Country: Kenya
- County: Nairobi City
- Sub-county: Njiru

Area
  - Total: 4.2 km^{2} (1.6 sq mi)

Population (2019)
  - Total: 23,173
  - Density: 5,478/km^{2} (14,190/sq mi)

Njiru is a neighbourhood in the city of Nairobi. Located within the larger Eastlands area of Nairobi, it is approximately 13 kilometres (8.1 mi) east of the central business district.

== Location ==
Njiru is located approximately 13 kilometres (8.1 mi) east of Nairobi's central business district, straddled by Kangundo Road to the north and south, within the Eastlands area. It was formally part of larger Embakasi division. It borders other neighbourhoods such as Kayole, Ruai, Saika and Mwiki. Electorally, Njiru is placed under Kasarani Constituency; Njiru however, forms part of the larger sub-county of the same name that spans through neighbourhoods as far as from the Outer Ring Road to the furthest east in Kamulu.

== Overview ==
Njiru is generally a low-income to medium-income, mixed-use neighbourhood located in Nairobi's Eastlands area. The neighbourhood exhibits characteristics of a medium-density suburb, having a mix of storey buildings as well single-family dwellings.

== Njiru Sub-county ==
The sub-county borrows its name from the neighbourhood. It is the second largest sub-county after Lang'ata with an area of 129.9 km^{2} (50.2 sq mi). It borders Embakasi sub-county. It covers eastern to the furthest east area in Nairobi: from Kariobangi South, Dandora, Ruai, Saika, Njiru, parts of Kayole, to Kamulu. The sub-county has a population of 626,482, the highest after Embakasi and Kasarani sub-counties; with a population density of 4,821 square kilometres (1,861 sq mi).

The sub-county is headquartered in Ruai, headed by a Deputy County Commissioner, working under the Ministry of Interior.
