= Malik Ambersley =

American social media personality

- Born: April 22, 1998 (age 28)
- Other names: Leaks World; NPC Miles Morales
- Occupations: Social media personality; livestreamer
- Years active: 2023–present
- Known for: Portraying Miles Morales in interactive "NPC" livestreams
- Height: 5 ft 6 in (1.68 m)

Malik Ambersley (born April 12, 1998), also known by his username Leaks World, is an American social media personality active on Twitch and TikTok. He gained viral fame starting in 2023 for doing interactive live streams cosplaying and acting as the Marvel Comics superhero Miles Morales, after which he was referred to as "NPC Miles Morales". In 2024, he appeared in online content with streamers like Druski and Kai Cenat.

== Early life ==
During the COVID-19 pandemic, Ambersley worked at Domino's in St. Petersburg, Florida. There, he was the subject of a viral clip depicting him "being outraged after not having received a tip from a customer while on shift" and smashing pizza boxes. He stated that no one was in the store at the time and that he was not fired for his actions.

== Career ==
=== NPC Miles Morales ===
Prior to his career on social media, Ambersley was homeless. Starting in 2023, he began creating content on Twitch and TikTok under the channel name of Leaks World. In particular, he gained traction and attention for his live streams on TikTok Live where he performed out in public as Miles Morales by repeating a stock set of lines. For these performances, he was dubbed "NPC Miles Morales," referring to the video game and slang term of non-player character (NPC). At the time, content creators pretending to be NPCs was becoming a lucrative trend, as users would send paid gifts to them as they performed. Through the platform's gift system, in which viewers can pay to send gifts to live streams, Ambersley, while imitating Miles Morales, would repeat a unique set of lines particular to each specific gift similar to how an NPC in a video game would.

Other times, such as whenever his performance was interfered with by a passerby, Ambersley would break character, sometimes causing a viral moment. Some of Ambersley's most viral and, at times, controversial moments included him getting robbed, landing in trouble with law enforcement, and even ending up in physical altercations. Once, Ambersley drew controversy for performing inside of a store; he also broke character to swear and lash out at another NPC streamer beside him in public. On other occasions, he ran from police officers and spoke to a security guard while in character. On August 11, 2024, GameRant reported that Ambersley had been arrested during one of his live streams; footage revealed that he had started a fight with other individuals in a parking garage prior to starting his NPC segment.

Some publications, like Polygon, have compared his performances to "those street performers who pretend to be statues"; Polygon also opined that "His genre of content blends the live stunt antics of someone like Kai Cenat with a specific meme-like video game humor that I associate with early Smosh YouTube videos." Insider Gaming called Ambersley "by far the most prolific creator" to have leaned into TikTok's NPC trend between 2023 and 2024. Esports Illustrated called him and Pinkydoll "two of the most famous NPC streamers." By November 2024, Leaks World amassed over a million followers on TikTok.

=== Collaborations ===
Outside of his TikTok Lives, Ambersley and his NPC Miles Morales bit have appeared on online segments with other social media personalities like Druski. During streamer Kai Cenat's month-long streaming marathon, called Mafiathon 2, starting on November 1, 2024, Ambersley participated in several days of Cenat's programming. One night, Ambersley read out the names of new subscribers to Cenat's channel while Cenat was sleeping on the stream. Occasionally, he would break character and lash out at some of the streaming marathon's participants including Cenat himself, Druski, and comedian Kevin Hart. Regarding the NPC Miles Morales bit, Hart joked that it seemed like Ambersley was "stuck in Nickelodeon".

On November 2, Ambersley got to meet actor Shameik Moore, who voiced Miles Morales in Spider-Man: Into the Spider-Verse and Spider-Man: Across the Spider-Verse, after Cenat invited Moore to the house where the streaming marathon was taking place. Together, they chatted outside of their personas and danced to songs from the Miles Morales films' soundtracks, including "Sunflower" by Post Malone and Swae Lee.

=== Future plans ===
On a Twitch stream, Ambersley indicated his intentions to move past his NPC performances and start streaming as himself. When asked if he would still perform as NPC Miles Morales, he said, "No, I think I would rather want to be known as me. I'll still do the characters every now and then but as in doing the NPC thing, standing outside, I don't think so. I think at some point, I need to branch out." He also stated that Cenat had been inspirational to him in his decision to pivot as a social media personality.

== Other ventures ==
On September 18, 2026, Misfits Boxing announced that Ambersley would be participate in a MF–Professional boxing on October 10 at the Copper Box Arena in London, England on the Joey Essex vs. Dapper Laughs undercard. However in early October, the bout was cancelled for unknown reasons.
