= Kamulu =

Neighbourhood in Nairobi

- Neighborhood
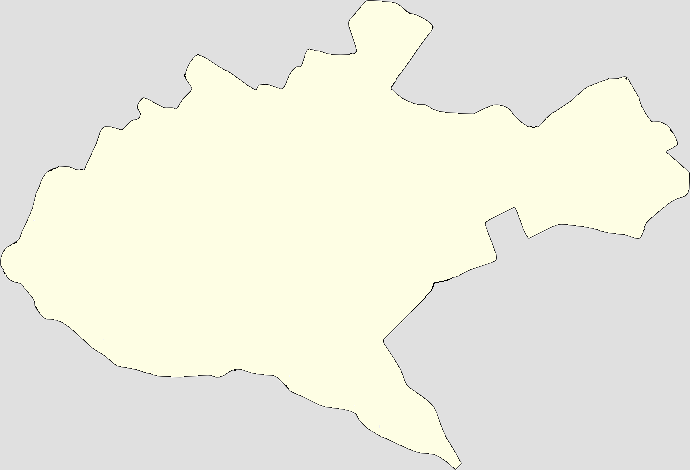
- Location of Kamulu in Nairobi County = Kamulu (Kenya)
- Coordinates: 1.252721°S 37.072392°E
- Country: Kenya
- County: Nairobi City
- Sub-county: Njiru
- Postal Code: 00520
- Established: 1920's

Government
  - Body: Nairobi City County

Area
  - Neighborhood: 9.9 sq mi (25.6 km^{2})

Population (2019)
  - Neighborhood: 33,351
  - Density: 3,400/sq mi (1,300/km^{2})
  - Urban: 17,434 (Kamulu)
  - Metro: 15,917 (Ngundu)

Kamulu is a neighbourhood in Nairobi City County located to the North East of the Nairobi Central Business District (CBD). It borders Joska (Matungulu) in Machakos County to the east, Mwalimu Farm Ruiru to the north, Njiru to the west, and Mihang'o to the south west. Kamulu belongs to the Ruai ward of Kasarani constituency of Nairobi County.

== History ==
Kamulu was originally settled by the White settlers of Kenya who established plantations during the Colonial era. Kamulu was later given to the Kenyan republic government and designated as a residential suburb in Nairobi. Kamulu has developed from being a historical marketplace for Kamba and European settlers to a developed town in Kenya.

== Ethnicity ==
Most of the population is Bantu (the majority being Kikuyu's and Kamba), who migrated after 1961 when the British left Kenya, Luhya, Abagusii, and Luo also make up a part of the population.

== Religion ==
Kamulu has many churches and mosques which the local people attend. Some of the major churches include: Kenya Assemblies of God (KAG) with branches in Ng'undu, Vinna stage and Stage 26, St. Vincent de Paul Catholic Church in Ng'undu with its outstation at Athi Market, ACK(Anglican Church of Kenya), Presbyterian Church of East Africa (PCEA), PEFA, SDA (Seventh Day Adventist) Kamulu main in Sir Henry area, FGCK (Full Gospel Churches of Kenya), Halleluyah Gospel church, Full Grace church, CITAM Kangundo Road, Majestic City Church ,Christian Outreach Ministries and many more with some major upcoming constructions. Masjid Aisha and Masjid Quba are just two of the many mosques in the area.

== Rivers ==
The Mbagathi River (at Kamulu town bridge) and Nairobi River both pass through Kamulu. A popular river known as the Athi River passes on the lower side of the town.

== Neighborhoods in Kamulu ==
Divisions in Kamulu include Acacia, Makongeni, Gituamba, Stage 26, Makongo, Kanisani, Sir Henry, Acre Tano, Kingori's, Ngundu, Vina, Athi, Kamulu 1 and Kamulu 2. The boundary between Nairobi County and Machakos County lies at one end of the Kamulu area at the Athi River Bridge, making Kamulu the Eastern-most entry to Nairobi according to the District & Boundaries Act of 1992.

== Notable landmarks ==
The Nairobi River and Mbagathi River pass through the peripheries of this area making it a key part of the Athi River Basin.

== Real estate ==
Kamulu is rapidly developing with many people building commercial and residential properties all over the divisions in Kamulu. The two most populous divisions in Kamulu are: Kamulu town and Sir Henry Estate. The Kamulu neighborhood remains one of the most sought-after areas for real estate development in the Kasarani Constituency. In 2016, Kamulu was ranked among the fastest growing real-estate areas along Kangundo Road.

== Banking ==
Kamulu is primarily served by Cooperative Bank in Kamulu town which has an indoor ATM.

== Education ==
Kamulu has three public education institutions, Drumvale Primary School in Sir Henry, Kipawa Primary School near Kipawa Market, Athi Primary School in Athi Market and Ngundu Primary School in Ngundu. There are three public secondary institutions, Drumvale Secondary School in Drumvale, St.Georges Secondary School in Athi Market and Nile Road Secondary School in Ngundu. Kamulu also has a public vocational school; Kasarani Technical and Vocational College. The area also has various private learning institutions and colleges.

== Health ==
Kamulu has a government funded hospital in the Ng'undu Area with a capacity of 20 beds, and one maternity facility. It is located nearby Depaul Church.

It also has private dispensaries and chemists.

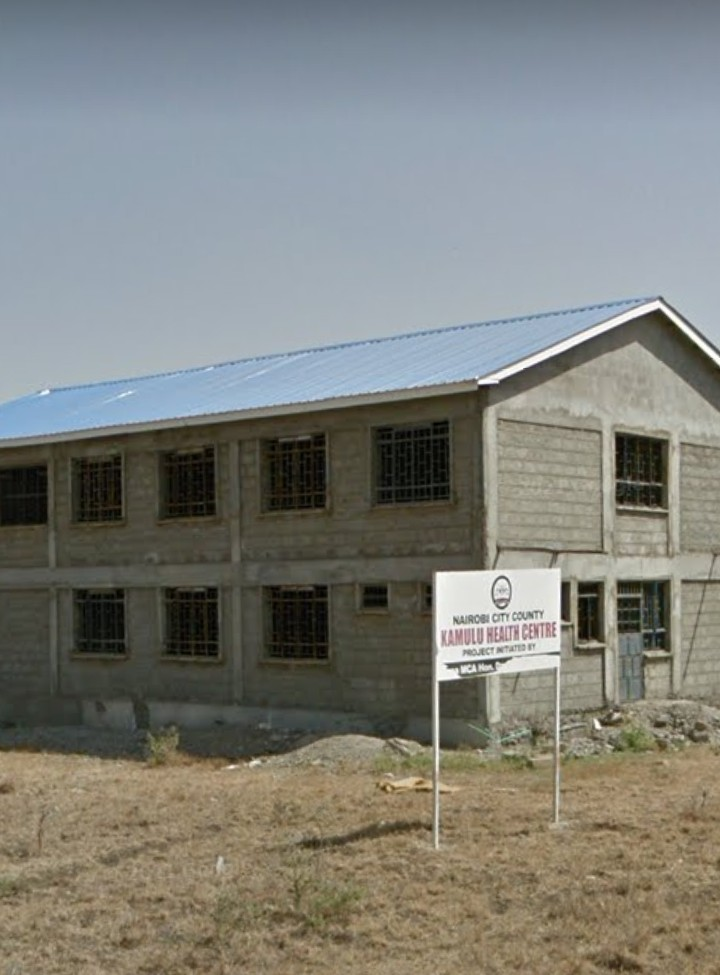
Abandoned Kamulu health centre

== Police presence ==
Kamulu police posts are located in Ngundu and Drumvale. Kamulu is serviced by the Kamulu Police Station located in the Riverside area.

== Social amenities ==
Kamulu has many social amenities, from clubs to swimming pools. It has hair parlours, cyber cafes, butcheries, guesthouses, resorts, many shopping centres, small scale shops, wholesale shops and supermarkets.

=== Sports ===
Various soccer grounds with already well established teams are present in the area. Kamulu FC is one of the popular teams in the area and plays in the East Nairobi County League.

== Transportation ==
Kamulu is found along the proposed dual carriageway of Kangundo Road roughly 35 kilometres (22 mi) east of Nairobi. As such, the settlement can be accessed via Jogoo and Juja Road exiting on Outer-Ring Road, Thika Road and the Nairobi Eastern Bypass Highway.

As you move toward interior Kamulu, dirt roads are common, but are slated for upgrading to asphalt.

In Kamulu town, the largest densely populated area in the neighborhood, roads sometimes become slightly impassable during the rainy season.

Matatu (Mat, Mathree) saccos to Kamulu, route 39, include: Embassava, Atomic Shuttle, City Star Shuttle, Kubamba Ltd, Super Metro Ltd, Metro Trans Ltd, Ngumo Line, Eastern Bypass sacco, Enabled, Bus Line, Forward Travellers, CBS (County Bus Service) and other popular saccos. Most of the Sacco's dominate the area.

== Water utilities ==
Kamulu is connected to the Nairobi City Water And Sewerage Company. There are many Water towers and water distribution services in the area.

== Entertainment ==
Kamulu is home to a good number of entertainment and recreational facilities. Notably, Freetown at Stage 26, Isabella, Levante Lounge, Stylus Lounge, The Harp, El Classico, Kamulu Children's park, Vatican, Bolingo, etc.
