= Umoja, Nairobi =

Suburb of Nairobi, Kenya

Umoja
- Location of Umoja in Kenya
- Coordinates: 01°16′56″S 36°53′32″E
- Country: Kenya
- County: Nairobi City
- Sub-county: Embakasi

Area
  - Total: 1.2 sq mi (3.1 km^{2})

Population (2019)
  - Total: 140,216
  - Density: 115,380/sq mi (44,547/km^{2})

Umoja is a residential suburb in the city of Nairobi. Located within the larger sub-county of Embakasi and the Eastlands area of Nairobi. It is approximately 8.4 kilometres (5.2 mi) east of Nairobi's central business district. Umoja consists of three smaller neighbourhoods: Umoja I, Umoja II and Umoja Innercore.

== Location ==
Umoja is located approximately 8.4 kilometres (5.2 mi) east of Nairobi's central business district, within the Eastlands area in Embakasi. It neighbours other low middle-income to low-income suburbs such as Buruburu, Donholm, Kariobangi and Tena.

== Overview ==
Umoja was commission by Nairobi City Commission to provide housing to the growing urban population. However, with the scarcity of funds, the council allowed residents to put up their own houses provided they are pay annual land rates. This saw Umoja and other neighbourhoods in Nairobi defying the initial urban planning, building on open spaces, a consequence of the corruption and impunity within the city council. Umoja is now a high-density housing, low-income to lower middle-income neighbourhood in Nairobi. It is divided into three phases: South of Kangundo Road and East of Outer Ring Road, Umoja I covers the north and westerly parts, Umoja II to the east, with Umoja Innercore as some sort of enclave of the two.

As per the 2019 census, Umoja had a population of 140,216, with 64,256 in Umoja I and 75,960 in Umoja II. The neighbourhood had a population density of 44,547/km^{2} in a land area of 3.1 km^{2}.
