= Mbagathi River =

River in Kenya

The Mbagathi River is a river in Kenya near Nairobi, it is a key tributary of the Athi River. The river rises from a natural spring to the North West of the Ngong Hills at a settlement called Kerarapon. The river is somewhat fortunate in that it does not run through a built up area, until it reaches the sprawling conurbation in North Kajiado called Ongata Rongai (meaning Narrow Plain in the KiMaa language). Along its northern boundary it is somewhat protected by middle class homes and flows east it abuts Nairobi National Park. It then benefits from environmental protection from the National Park and by reduced interference on its northern and to some extent its southern bank. The river's first 20–30 kilometres are relatively unpolluted despite its proximity to Nairobi. There is occasional evidence of the discharge of effluent and rubbish including plastics. Just before it forms the southern boundary of the Nairobi National Park it passes an informal settlement known locally as 'Bangladesh'. Several key streams, particularly the Mokoyeti and Sosian, which rise in the Ngong Forest, feed the river via the National Park. It forms the southern boundary of Nairobi National Park. Herds of animals cross the river when migrating. It also forms the eastern boundary of Nairobi county passing through Utawala, between Kamulu and Joska. A number of small dams have been built along the river.
