= 2015 visit by Pope Francis to Kenya =

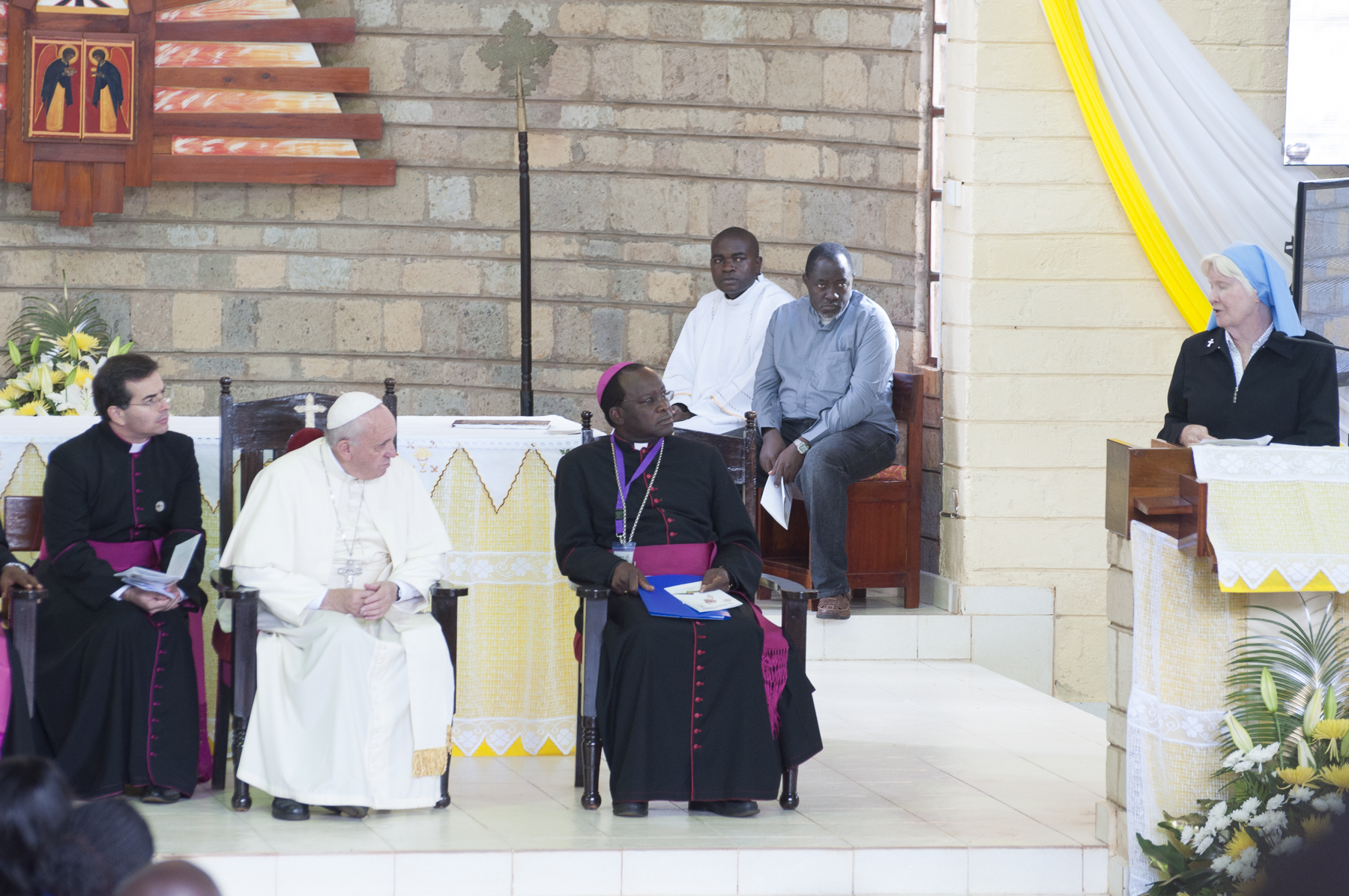
Pope Francis at St. Joseph, Kangemi on 27 November

Pope Francis visited Kenya from 25 to 27 November 2015. It was his first state and pastoral visit to the country and the continent of Africa at large. Francis is the second pontiff to visit Kenya after John Paul II who visited Kenya 3 times. In his visit, he met the president of the Republic of Kenya, Uhuru Kenyatta, held meetings with various members of the clergy, held an open mass at the University of Nairobi and visited a poor slum neighbourhood of Kangemi. As a result of his visit, most of the roads in Nairobi were closed on Thursday and parts of Friday.

== Schedule ==
The Pope's 3 day schedule as published on the Vatican website at w2.vatican.va

=== Wednesday, 25 November 2015 ===
The Pope arrived at JKIA at 1335 GMT.

Time	Activity	Where
1700	Arrival and Welcoming ceremony at the State House	State House Nairobi
1800	Courtesy visit to the President of the Republic	State House Nairobi
1830	Meeting with the Public Authorities of Kenya and the Diplomatic Corps	

=== Thursday, 26 November 2015 ===
Thursday was declared a public holiday by the President Uhuru Kenyatta.

Time	Activity	Where
0815	Interreligious and ecumenical meeting	Hall of the Apostolic Nunciature in Nairobi
1000	Holy Mass	University of Nairobi Main Campus Grounds
1545	Meeting with the Clergy, Men and Women Religious and Seminarians	St Mary’s School
1730	Visit to the U.N.O.N. (United Nations Office at Nairobi)	UNON Complex, Gigiri

=== Friday, 27 November 2015 ===
Time	Activity	Where
0830	Visit to Kangemi	Kangemi Slum. There was a miracle of healing in Kenya, reported in The Catholic Mirror. Rosemary Nundu, who was on crutches for years, presented the Pope with the Rosary of the Unborn, fell to the ground and woke up healed, she no longer needs crutches. More about the Rosary of the Unborn, the new sacramental for our world today, go to www.rosaryoftheunborn.eu
1000	Meeting with youth	Kasarani Stadium
1115	Meeting with the Bishops of Kenya	VIP Lounge at Kasarani Stadium
1510	Farewell ceremony	JKIA
1530	Departure to Entebbe	JKIA

== Security ==
A total of 10,000 police officers were deployed to secure the Pope's visit.

== Closed roads ==
In a televised press release, Inspector General of Police, Joseph Boinnet informed the public about road closures during the visit.
