= Mowlem, Nairobi =

Neighbourhood in Nairobi, Kenya

Mowlem
- Location of Mowlem in Kenya
- Coordinates: 1°15′56″S 36°53′45″E
- Country: Kenya
- County: Nairobi City
- Sub-county: Njiru

Area
  - Total: 3.4 km^{2} (1.3 sq mi)

Population (2019)
  - Total: 88,039
  - Density: 25,641/km^{2} (66,410/sq mi)
- Time zone: UTC+3

Mowlem is a neighbourhood in the city of Nairobi. It is approximately 9 kilometres (5.6 mi) east of the central business district of Nairobi.

== Overview ==
Mowlem is an impoverished neighbourhood. Mowlem is named after the British construction company Mowlem, that in 1971 was contracted to construct the Kangundo Road. The neighbourhood can be deemed underdeveloped by comparing it to more upmarket suburbs in Nairobi. The government is set up to build affordable housing in the suburb, approximately 4,900 housing units, an effort to curb the housing deficit. The lower middle class neighbourhoods within Mowlem comprises maisonettes and flats.

Mowlem Ward, an electoral ward in Embakasi West Constituency, borrows its nomenclature on the neighbourhood. It covers the constituency areas located north of Kangundo Road. Part of the constituency forms part of the larger Njiru Sub-county.
