= Embakasi West Constituency =

Constituency in Nairobi County, Kenya

Embakasi West
- constituency for the Parliament of Kenya
- Embakasi West Constituency within Nairobi City County

- Nairobi City County within Kenya
- County: Nairobi City
- Area: 9.35 km^{2} (3.6 sq mi)

Current constituency
- Created: 2013
- Number of members: One
- Party: Jubilee Party
- Member of Parliament: Mark Mwenje
- Created from: Embakasi & Kamukunji

Embakasi West is a constituency in Nairobi. It is one of seventeen constituencies in Nairobi County. The constituency was formed prior to the 2013 elections, and has an area of 9.35 km^{2} (3.6 sq mi). Most of the area that forms Embakasi West Constituency was part of Embakasi Constituency; though some of its areas were part of Kamukunji Constituency. Embakasi West includes four electoral wards: Umoja I, Umoja II, Mowlem, and Kariobangi South.
