= Kangemi =

Kangemi is a peri-urban area in Kenya located in Westlands Sub-county in Nairobi County, on the outskirts of the city. It is bordered on the north by the middle-class neighbourhoods of Loresho and Kibagare and Westlands on the west. Its southern border connects with Kawangware, a large slum and its eastern border connects to Mountain View, another middle-class enclave. It is on the road connecting Nairobi with Naivasha. Kangemi has more than 100,000 residents. While it is a multi-ethnic slum, the largest group of residents consists of the Luhya tribe, who are majorly tenants attracted to Kangemi's low-cost rental houses and accessibility to employment opportunities mostly labor based However, the indigenous community is the Kikuyu tribe that owns the land and rental houses that other tribes live in. The Kikuyu have lived in Kangemi having moved from Dagoretti, Muranga and other areas in pre-colonial and colonial times and have established clans and family there.

Kangemi is located in a small valley. The slum has no sewerage. About 20,000 persons belong to a Catholic parish based in Kangemi. The St. Joseph Catholic Parish is one of the places Pope Francis visited during his visit to Africa between 26 and 30 November 2015, of which Kenya was his first stopover. He visited Kangemi on 27 November 2015. He met with the community and gave an address. Kangemi High School exists in Kangemi.

== See also ==
- Dagoretti
- Githurai
- Huruma
- Kawangware
- Kiambiu
- Kibera
- Korogocho
- Mathare
- Muirigo
- Mukuru kwa Njenga
- Uthiru
