= Mugabe Were =

Kenyan politician

Mellitus Mugabe Were
- Born: 9 August 1968; Kenya
- Died: 29 January 2008 (aged 39); Nairobi, Kenya
- Cause of death: Assassination (gunshot wounds)
- Occupation: Politician
- Known for: Member of Parliament for Embakasi Constituency (2007–2008)
- Office: Member of the National Assembly of Kenya
- Predecessor: David Mwenje
- Successor: Ferdinand Waititu
- Political party: Orange Democratic Movement (ODM)
- Spouse: Agnes Wairimu

Mellitus Mugabe Were (9 August 1968 – 29 January 2008) was a Kenyan politician affiliated to the Orange Democratic Movement (ODM). He was elected to the National Assembly of Kenya to represent Embakasi Constituency in the parliamentary election held on 27 December 2007. He was killed outside his house in the Nairobi suburb of Woodley, adjacent to the Kibera slum.

== Political career ==
Were had been a voice for moderation in Kenya's escalating political crisis, shuttling between leaders of different ethnic groups and organising a youth peace march just before he died.

== Death ==
Were was returning home in Woodley Estate near Jamhuri estate, Nairobi, after 11 pm, and whilst waiting for the gate to his house to be opened, he was shot three times. His widow, Agnes Wairimu, alerted by the gunshots, came outside and found him, taking him to Nairobi Hospital. He was announced dead on arrival. ODM spokespersons were quick to blame the government, however President Mwai Kibaki also condemned the murder as a "heinious crime". As mourners gathered outside his home, the police arrived and fired tear gas at them. 50 youth from amongst the mourners started to erect barricades. The police claimed that tear gas only drifted into the compound of Were's house, but local TV stations provided evidence that canisters were deliberately targeted on the house.

=== Culprits sentenced ===
Using fingerprint evidence the police were able to track down James Omondi (alias Castro) as the first suspect. He led them to the other two, Wycliffe Walimbwa Simiyu (alias Zimbo) and Paul Otieno (alias Baba). All three were found guilty of his murder on 9 February 2015.

== Sources ==
- Respectance (includes photo)
