= Babu Owino =

Kenyan politician

Honorable Babu Owino

Member of Parliament
- Incumbent
- Assumed office 31 August 2017
- Preceded by: John Omondi Ogutu
- Constituency: Embakasi East

Personal details
- Born: 10 October 1989 (age 37) Kisumu, Kisumu District, Nyanza Province, Kenya
- Party: Orange Democratic Movement
- Children: 3
- Occupation: Politician
- Profession: Lawyer
- Nickname: Babu Owino

Paul Ongili Owino (born 10 October 1989), also known as Babu Owino, is a Kenyan politician and member of parliament for Embakasi East Constituency. He gained media recognition as the chairperson of Students Organisation of Nairobi University (SONU). He is also an Advocate of the High Court of Kenya.

== Early life and education ==
Owino attended Central Primary School (Kisumu). From 2003 to 2006 he joined Kisumu Boys' Secondary School.

In 2008, he joined the University of Nairobi for a bachelor's degree in Actuarial Science and graduated with First Class Honors in 2012. He later pursued a Master's in Actuarial Science. In 2013, he went back to Nairobi University (UoN) to pursue a degree in Law.

== Career ==
=== Political career ===
In 2011,he was elected as the chairperson alongside his long time supporter Sammy Aluse aka Shash the Student Organisation of Nairobi University (SONU). His leadership revived student activism in UoN, a tenure that witnessed high activity in matters student leadership and student welfare. He still advocates for student leadership matters even after his exit upon graduating from the university.

On 31 August 2017, he was elected as a member of parliament for Embakasi East Constituency. In August 2022 he got re-elected for a second term as Embakasi East MP where he currently serves as its legislator. He is a lifetime member of the ODM Party.

In April 2026, Babu Owino was awarded as the best performing Member of Parliament in Kenya by Politrack Africa.

=== Legal career ===
On 23 May 2025, Owino was admitted to the bar as an advocate of the High Court of Kenya. He declared his admission as the beginning of a new chapter in his political and social justice crusade.

== Personal life ==
Owino is a husband to Frida Muthoni with whom they have two daughters. Babu also has another child (a son) from a previous relationship with an unnamed woman, making him the father of three biological children.

== Controversy ==
=== Attempted murder ===
In January 2020, Owino was arrested for shooting an unarmed nightclub DJ in the neck at close range while at B-Club, a popular nightclub in the Kilimani area in Nairobi. Owino was charged with attempted murder. He was jailed for 7 days and is currently out on bail pending completion of the case. According to Owino, he acted in self defence after he was provoked. A video of the shooting was published by several media, leading the DCI to announce that his office will charge him with attempted murder because it was clear he intended to kill the man. In the video, Babu is seen shooting Felix Orinda, also known as DJ Evolve, and dragging his body out of the night club with other unidentified persons.

In December 2021, Owino reportedly entered a civil agreement with the victim out of capital crimes of attempted murder he committed against the victim of the shooting including purchase of cars, a house and hospital bills and a series of payments to the victim. Owino attracted criticism for being drafted into the next government by continuing a never ending pattern of impunity where a number of politicians engage in capital crimes of murder, rape and even convicted of corruption crimes and are conveniently left unpunished because of corruption and impunity in Kenya, then later commit the same crimes against other members of the public.

Babu joins a string of elected Kenyan politicians with criminal records that have their criminal records mysteriously end for them to be conveniently allowed to pay out of crimes. In 2017, Starehe MP Jaguar, was also convicted of killing two people by vehicular manslaughter, he was fined ksh 40,000 and barred from driving for one year.

The courts have been criticised for minimising inconveniences to Owino owing to bizarre legal, sometimes unconstitutional but politically convenient provisions such as enabling bail payment of attempted murder in installments, accommodations not offered to ordinary Kenyans because of political patronage of impunity and corruption. The magistrate's ruling was also criticised for allowing restorative justice to the victim, in a capital offence (a responsibility of the state independent of restoration to the victim) without first getting punishment that would deter Owino from repeating the same crimes as an elected official against other members of the public.

=== Hate speech, threats and insults ===
In September 2021, Owino was accused of making threatening phone calls, sending threatening messages and intimidating journalists. According to several media outlets in Kenya, in September 2017, Owino was arrested for verbally insulting Kenya's President Uhuru Muigai Kenyatta. Multiple leaders across the political spectrum in Kenya called for stern legal action to be taken against him for abusing freedom of speech by making blatantly disparaging remarks against the president. He was arrested and charged with hate speech in Nairobi.

=== Assaults ===
Owino has been reported numerous times for physically assaulting several people in Kenya, including fellow legislators, parking attendants, night guards among many others. Some of the incidents have included videos published by various news stations with him physically confronting multiple people. In September 2017 Owino was arrested and charged for assaulting and causing grievous body harm to a voter. In January 2018 Owino was arrested for assaulting a parking attendant together with his aides in Westlands, Nairobi for allegedly refusing to pay parking fees. Owino denied the allegations despite a video showing the parking attendant being assaulted. In November 2018 Owino was involved in a bare knuckle physical fight over differing political positions with fellow legislator, Starehe Constituency MP Jaguar within parliament buildings.
