= Doonholm =

- Location within Kenya
- Coordinates: 1.28°S 36.87°E
- Country: Kenya
- Sub-county: Embakasi & Makadara
- Time zone: UTC+3 (EAT)

Doonholm or Donholm is a commercial and residential neighbourhood in Nairobi. A legacy of what was a dairy farm with the same name, Doonholm is a suburb in the Eastlands area of Nairobi. The original Doonholm estates Doonholm 1 and Doonholm 2 are located in Makadara. As the city housing demands increased an exclave of Doonholm was launched in Embakasi. The newer Doonholm is located 8 kilometres (5 mi) east of the Nairobi central business district, within the larger sub-county of Embakasi.

== Location ==
Donholm is located 8 kilometres (5 mi) east of the Nairobi central business district, and east of the Outer Ring Road. It borders the Umoja, Tena, Savannah, and Kayole neighbourhoods.

== Overview ==
Donholm is the oldest estate amongst those in the Eastlands area. Donholm's name comes from a colonial Kenya land and plantation owner James Kerr Watson (3 October 1881 – 11 November 1955), who gave the name Doonholm to his dairy farm in the area. The estate was 4600 acres by 1900 stretching from the City Stadium to where it stands now.

The original Doonholm estates Doonholm 1 and Doonholm 2 are located in Makadara (formerly known as Doonholm). As the city housing demands increased an exclave of Doonholm was launched in Embakasi.

Donholm has various estates including Harambee Sacco, Phase 5, Old Donholm, New Donholm and Phase 8 which also hold various Courts. It has increasingly turned into a high-density suburb, hosting the lower middle-income to low-income segment of Nairobi residents.
