= John David Kali =

Kenyan war veteran and politician

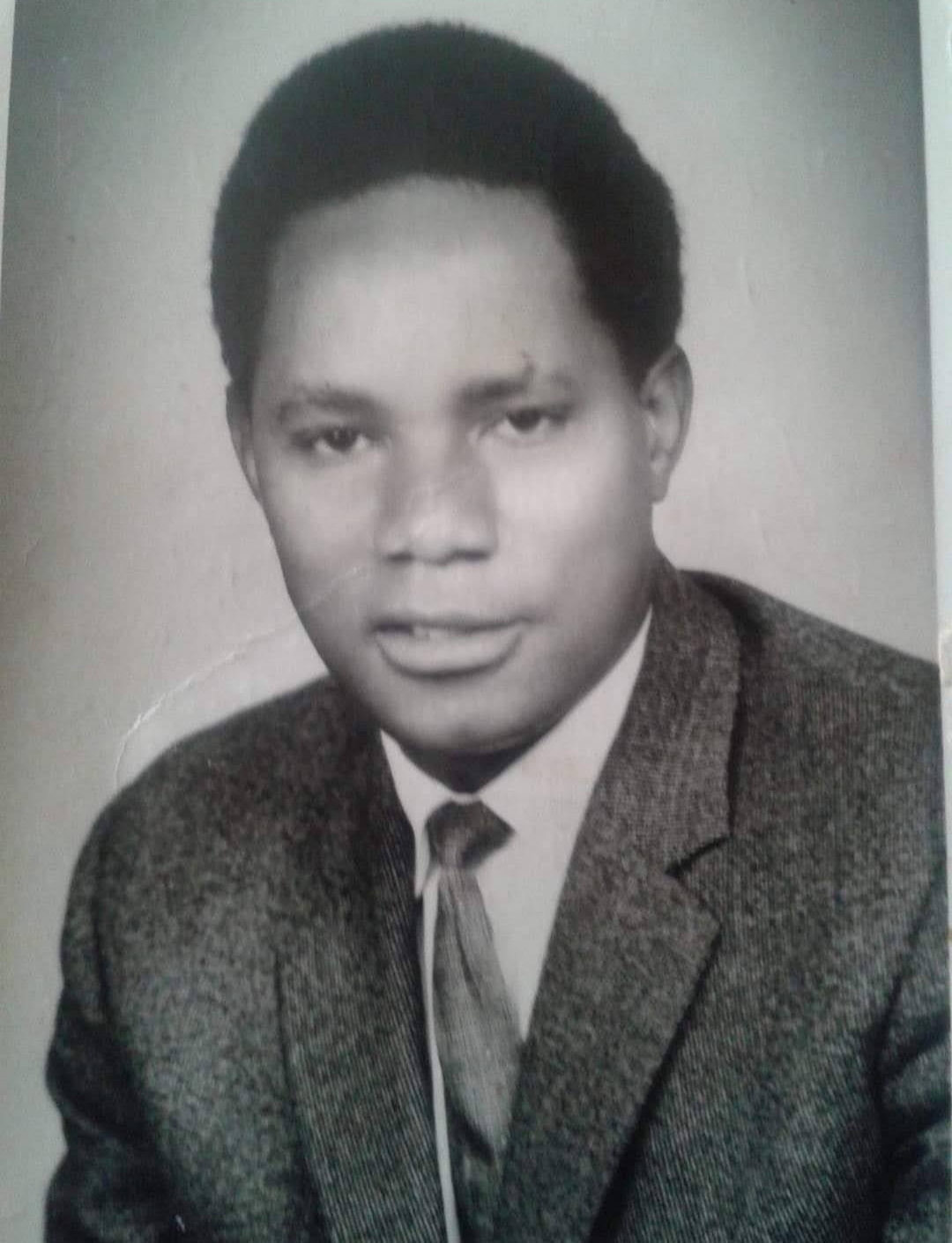
- John David Kali in 1965

Government Chief Whip
- In office June 1963 – 1965
- Preceded by: Position established
- Constituency: Nairobi East (1963–1966); Kilungu (1974–1979)

Personal details
- Born: 1920 or 1924 Kenya Colony
- Died: 7 July 1996
- Spouse: Tabitha Kali
- Children: Robert Muthwa Kali, Pinto Nzoka Kali, Jacqueline Nduku Kali
- Occupation: Politician • freedom fighter • soldier
- Known for: Mau Mau freedom struggle • Survival of Hola massacre • First Government Chief Whip of independent Kenya

John David Kali (1920 or 1924 (Note: The catalogue record for the Makers of a Nation documentary gives his birth year as 1920. Official colonial and identity records give his date of birth as 18 October 1924, a discrepancy common among Kenyans of his generation whose births were registered retrospectively.) – 7 July 1996) was a Kenyan politician, trade unionist, and World War II veteran. After serving with the King's African Rifles in the Burma campaign, he was detained during the 1952 Emergency and survived the 1959 Hola massacre. At independence in 1963, he was elected Member of Parliament for Nairobi East and became the first Government Chief Whip in the independent National Assembly. Following the proscription of the opposition Kenya People's Union in 1969, he was detained by the government of Jomo Kenyatta, making him one of the few Kenyan nationalists imprisoned by both the colonial and post-independence administrations.

== Early life and World War II service ==
John David Kali was born in colonial Kenya. In his twenties he enlisted in the King's African Rifles and served in the East African Campaign and Burma campaign during World War II. He fought with the 11th East African Division and later returned to a colony still under British rule.

During a visit to Kangundo by the British MPs Fenner Brockway and Leslie Hale, Kali, who accompanied them with Joseph Murumbi and others, was sent to fetch the District Commissioner; the DC arrested him and held him for a week. Murumbi recalled that there were "no grounds whatsoever" for the arrest. In late 1952, Kali was arrested for his involvement in the Mau Mau Uprising and classified a "hard-core" detainee. He was first held at Kajiado detention camp (Note: Kali’s detention chronology places him among the earliest detainees of the Emergency period (1952) and later among the hard-core detainees transferred to Hola. His imprisonment therefore overlapped in time, though not always in location, with figures such as Achieng Oneko and Pio Gama Pinto, who were detained in other parts of the colonial detention system during the same period.) and later transferred to Hola Detention Camp in Tana River. Kali survived the Hola massacre on 3 March 1959. Odinga later identified Kali as part of a significant stream of "militant African ex-servicemen," alongside figures such as Dedan Kimathi, P. J. Ngei, and Bildad Kaggia, who returned from World War II service in India, Burma, and Ceylon to join the anti-colonial struggle.

=== Trade union and nationalist networks ===
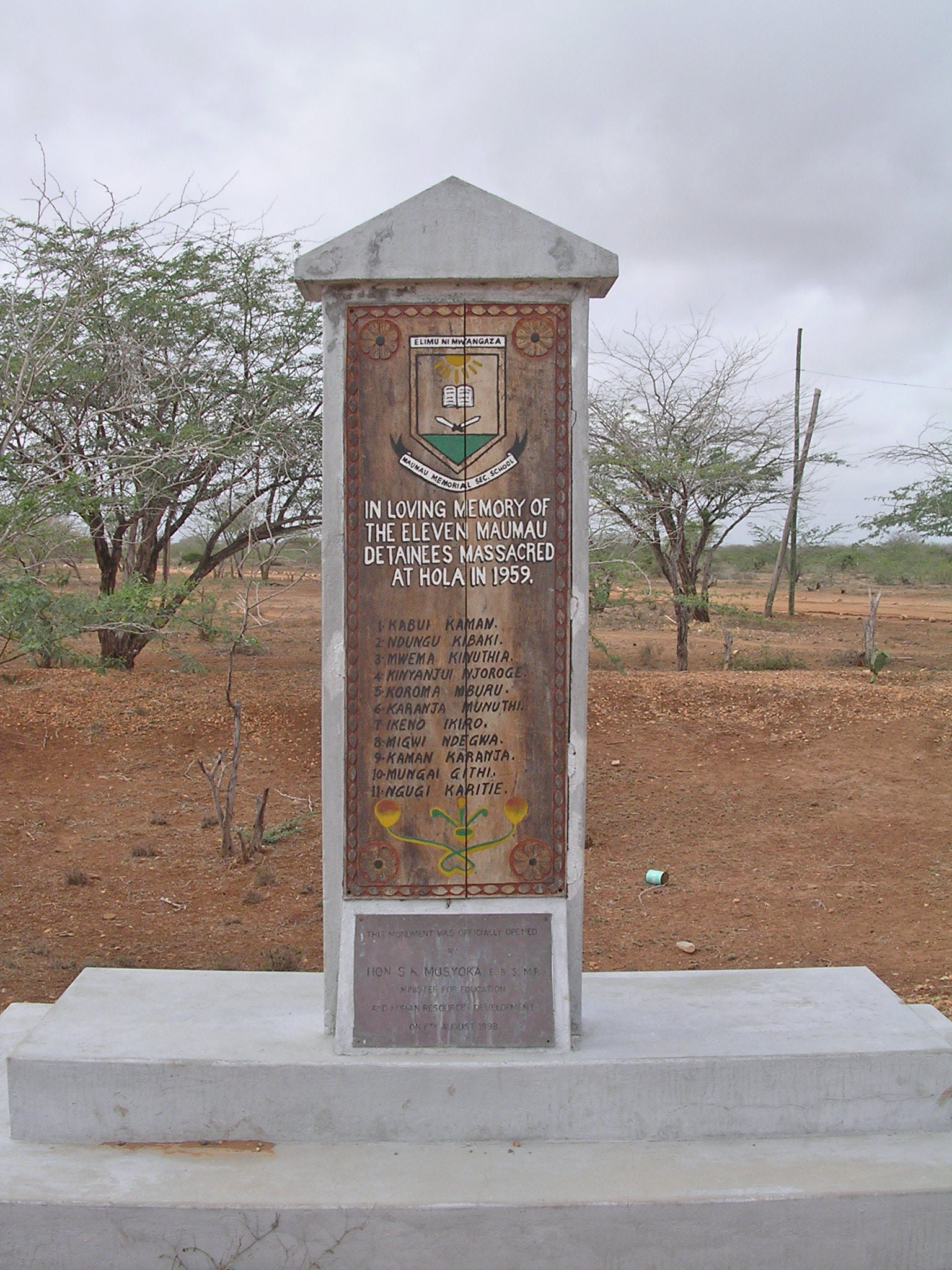
Monument at Hola Camp, where eleven Mau Mau detainees were killed in 1959.

Contemporary accounts place Kali within the circle of activists who reorganized Kenya's trade-union movement in the late colonial and early independence period, alongside Fred Kubai, Aggrey Minya, Pio Gama Pinto, A. S. Rao, and Makhan Singh. The Pio Gama Pinto Archive similarly lists "JD Kali" as a key member of the Trade Union Movement during this formative era.

According to Jaramogi Oginga Odinga, Kali belonged to what Odinga described as a militant "inner core" of the Kenya African Union (KAU) that operated outside formal structures to prepare for immediate independence. This group established "Shadow Parliaments" and secret committees to coordinate nationalist activities throughout the colony during the early 1950s. This is corroborated by Achieng' Oneko, who, as newly appointed Secretary General of KAU, sought out Kali, one of his closest confidants, for his detailed knowledge of party affairs and of oath-taking in Nairobi; Kali briefed him on the relocation of KAU's operational meetings from Kiburi House to a new party office on Rhodes Avenue (later Haile Selassie Avenue). Oneko records that Kali sharply criticised Jomo Kenyatta's speech at the Kiambu meeting, declaring that "the unwavering Nairobi branch is speaking a different language" from the party headquarters, and that Kali and John Koinange counselled Oneko against further private meetings with the colonial Attorney General, John Whyte. Within the Kenya African Union's media ecosystem, the KAU mouthpiece Sauti ya Mwafrika was edited by Fred Kubai before being handed to J. D. Kali.

Gakaara wa Wanjaũ's detention diary, first published in Gĩkũyũ in 1983, lists Kali in its appendix of nationalist leaders swept into detention as a member of the National Central Committee of the Kenya African Union and editor of Sauti ya Mwafrika, alongside Achieng Oneko, Paul Ngei, Bildad Kaggia and Mbiyu Koinange. In the book's introduction, Gakaara also names Kali among the leaders of the movement's central committee, alongside Eliud Mutonyi, Fred Kubai and Kaggia.

On 20 October 1952, Governor Sir Evelyn Baring declared a State of Emergency and launched Operation Jock Scott, arresting Jomo Kenyatta and scores of other African political leaders. Kali was among those detained. Sauti ya Mwafrika was banned shortly afterwards.

=== Detention and the Emergency pipeline ===
The colonial administration classified Kali as a Z-category detainee, the hardest designation in the system, applied to those deemed unresponsive to rehabilitation and to be held without a fixed release date. He was moved through a series of camps the administration called "the Pipeline", including Kajiado, Manda Island, Kwale and Hola.

According to fellow detainee Gakaara wa Wanjau's diary, Kali was initially held at Kajiado detention camp, him being elected a house representative in October 1952 and camp leader on 24 January 1953. On 30 January 1953 he was among five detainees transported to Kapenguria to give testimony at the trial of Jomo Kenyatta, the authorities seeking to present Kenyatta's known associates in court; Gakaara's diary notes that Kali "was an editor with the KAU newspaper, Sauti ya Mwafrika".

In July 1953 Kali was among 138 detainees moved from Kajiado to Lamu, and on 10 August 1953 transferred by boat to Manda Island detention camp. Gakaara's diary records Kali in repeated leadership roles at Manda: elected to draft the detainees' protest memorandum during the August 1953 hunger strike; confronting the Commissioner of Prisons with a demand that detainees legally be charged in a court of law; delegated with George Waiyaki in June 1954 to press the rehabilitation officer for a political commission on detainees and a mass amnesty; consulted, alongside Waiyaki, Achieng Oneko and James Beauttah, on detainee reclassification; and appointed as work captain alongside Oneko and Mwinga Chokwe in July 1955. The diary also records him teaching in the camp school, and on 14 February 1954, he volunteered for work, so he could smuggle bread to starving detainees in the other compound, during the forced-labour standoff.

In late March 1956 Kali was transferred from Manda to Kwale detention camp in Kwale District. By May 1958 he was held at Hola, where Gakaara, arriving on 2 May 1958, listed him among old friends already detained there.

Gakaara's diary also preserves smaller details of camp life: Kali teaching fellow detainees how to cook, having worked in his father's hotel before detention; singing hymns at the camp's 1954 Christmas service; and being among the strongest swimmers on Manda, able to swim 300 yards out to sea.

Fellow detainee Gakaara wa Wanjaũ, then held at Hola Open Camp, recorded that on 3 March 1959 more than 100 soldiers of a special platoon, armed with guns, hoe handles and clubs and carrying iron shields, attacked about 85 detainees of Hola Closed Camp who had refused work, beating eleven to death and maiming many others. He recorded that visiting Legislative Council members were initially told the dead had drunk poisoned water, that autopsies at Kamiti confirmed death by beating, and that detainees smuggled a memorandum detailing the true events to the British Colonial Secretary and African political leaders.

His detention was discussed in the British Parliament on 6 November 1957, when Dingle Foot, Liberal MP for Ipswich, raised it, without naming him, as one of three examples of detention without adequate justification. Foot described a journalist held since the start of the Emergency on two grounds: that he had been "a close associate of Paul Ngei," and that he had edited a newspaper the authorities called "near-seditious" and had since banned. Foot told the House: "First, one takes emergency powers; then one uses those powers to suppress a newspaper, and then one uses the suppression of the newspaper as a ground for keeping a man in prison for four or five years." He concluded that detention on such grounds "cannot possibly be justified."

On 3 March 1959, guards at Hola Camp beat Z-category detainees who had refused a work order, killing eleven and injuring dozens more. Kali was among those who survived. The incident, the Hola massacre, triggered fierce debate in the House of Commons and put significant pressure on the British government over the future of colonial rule in Kenya.

Colonial administration records confirm Kali's presence at Hola following the massacre. Minutes of the Hola Settlement Council's Trade Sub-Committee, dated 6 September 1959, list him as a co-opted member, noting that he had been "invited for his expertise" in cooperative movements. A vote of thanks to Kali was carried unanimously at the close of the meeting, and the Sub-Committee recommended he "be requested to make himself available whenever possible." He was later transferred to Takwa Detention Camp on Manda Island, one of the most remote camps in the Pipeline.

== Political career and independence ==
By March 1961 Kali had been released and was assistant editor of Sauti ya KANU, the party newspaper; a letter to Murumbi that month described him as "the last editor of the KAU organ, Sauti ya Mwafrika". He joined the Kenya African National Union (KANU) and became an active organizer ahead of independence.

Following the May 1963 general election, Kali was elected to the House of Representatives as the Member of Parliament for Nairobi East and was appointed the first Government Chief Whip of independent Kenya. A photograph published in The East African shows Kali in 1964 alongside Joseph Murumbi, then Minister of State in the Prime Minister's Office, identifying Kali as the Chief Whip. Ng’weno records that he served as Chief Whip for two years during this foundational parliamentary period.

In September and October 1964, Kali accompanied by fellow parliamentarian Jeremiah Nyagah led a Kenyan parliamentary goodwill delegation to Beijing. The delegation attended China's 15th National Day celebrations and held official meetings with Chinese Vice Premier and Foreign Minister Marshal Chen Yi.

Throughout this period, Kali was closely associated with Pio Gama Pinto and Joseph Murumbi, sharing their socialist ideals within KANU's progressive wing. Following Pinto's assassination in February 1965, Kali helped establish the Pio Pinto Trust Fund together with Murumbi and Achieng Oneko to support Pinto's surviving family.

== Political realignment and the KPU ==
In the mid-1960s, ideological tensions emerged within KANU between conservative and progressive factions. Kali aligned with Jaramogi Oginga Odinga and other reformists in KANU’s progressive wing, advocating for socialist economic policies and land redistribution. He subsequently supported the formation of the opposition Kenya People's Union (KPU).

On 4 November 1969, following the banning of the KPU, Kali was formally detained under Regulation 6(1) of the Public Security (Detained and Restricted Persons) Regulations 1966 alongside Jaramogi Oginga Odinga, Achieng Oneko, and four other party officials. The detention order was gazetted on 7 November 1969 as Gazette Notice No. 3476, signed by Permanent Secretary for Home Affairs A. J. Omanga. On 1 November 1970, a delegation of Kamba elders and civic leaders visited President Kenyatta at his Gatundu residence to appeal for Kali's release, which was granted shortly thereafter.

== Return to Parliament and later life ==
Following his release from detention, Kali remained active in publishing and cooperative advocacy. In May 1972, he served as Chairman of Pan Africa Press, corresponding with Panaf Books editor June Milne regarding a proposed memorial publication for Pio Gama Pinto.

In the October 1974 general elections, Kali staged an electoral comeback, winning the Kilungu Constituency parliamentary seat in Machakos District on a KANU ticket. He represented Kilungu throughout the Third Parliament until 1979.

Kali died on 7 July 1996 (Saba Saba Day). He was married to Tabitha Kali and had three children: Robert Muthwa Kali, Pinto Nzoka Kali, and Jacqueline Nduku Kali.

== Legacy ==
In the documentary series Makers of a Nation, producer Hilary Ng'weno identified Kali as one of three Kenyan nationalists imprisoned by both the British colonial administration and the post-colonial Kenyatta government.

His wartime service, Mau Mau detention, and early parliamentary career are documented across memoirs of the independence period, including accounts by Oginga Odinga, Achieng Oneko, and Gakaara wa Wanjaũ. Historian David Anderson and colonial records note his role in the 1959 Hola massacre, which became a catalyst for debates over the detention camp system in the British House of Commons.
