= Non-player character =

Tabletop and video game character not controlled by a player

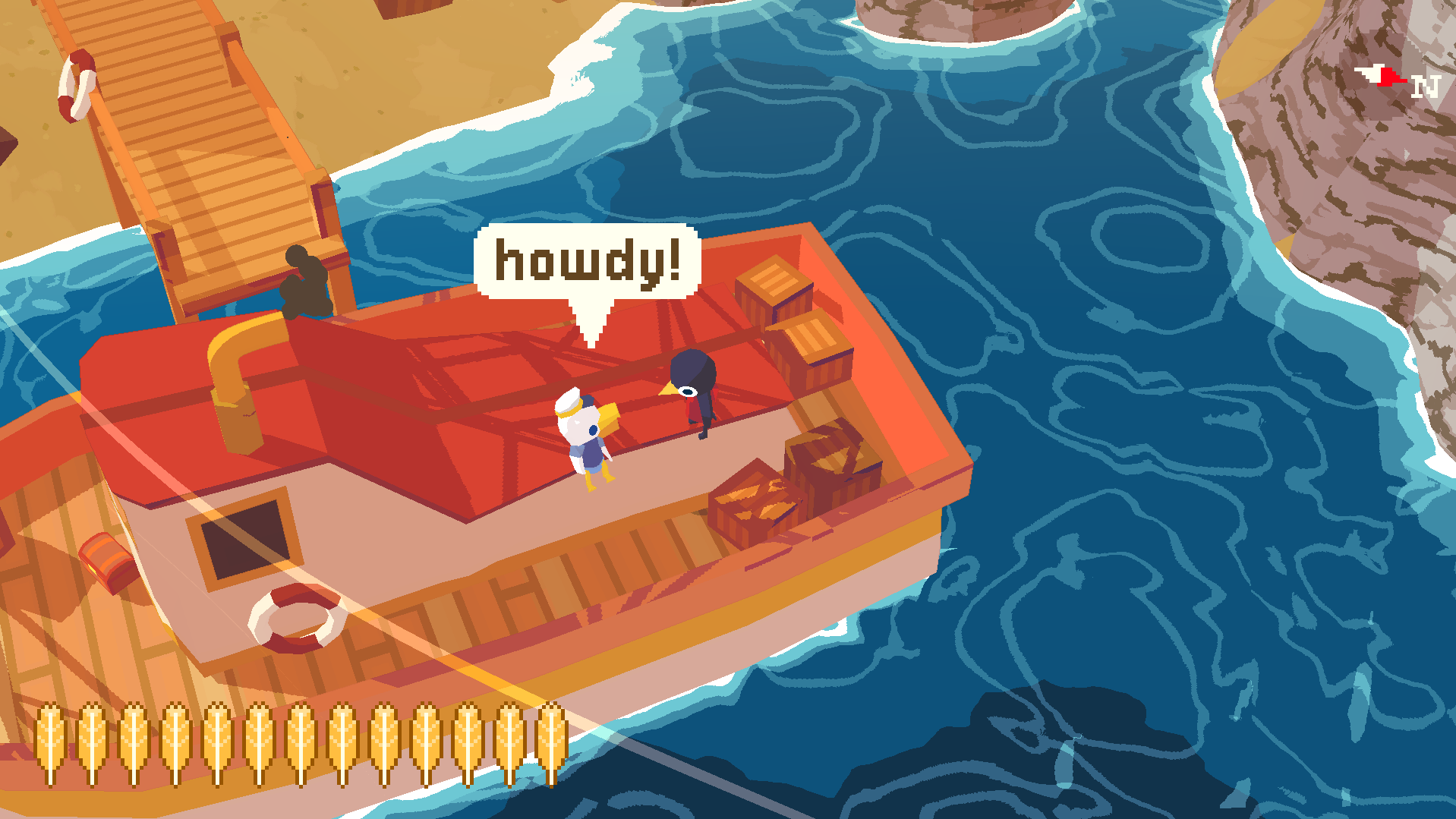
A non-player character greets the player in the 2019 video game A Short Hike.

A non-player character (NPC) is a character in a game that is not controlled by a player. The term originated in traditional tabletop role-playing games where it applies to characters controlled by the gamemaster, or referee, rather than by another player. In video games, this term usually means a computer-controlled character that has a predetermined set of behaviors that potentially will impact gameplay.

== Role-playing games ==
In traditional tabletop role-playing games (RPG) such as Dungeons & Dragons, an NPC is a character portrayed by a gamemaster (GM). While the player characters (PCs) form the narrative's protagonists, non-player characters can be thought of as the "supporting cast" or "extras" of a roleplaying narrative. Non-player characters populate the fictional world of the game, and can fill any role not occupied by a player character. Non-player characters might be allies, bystanders, or competitors to the PCs. NPCs can also be traders who trade currency for things such as equipment or gear. NPCs thus vary in their level of detail. Some may be only a brief description ("You see a man in a corner of the tavern"), while others may have complete game statistics and backstories.

There is some debate about how much work a gamemaster should put into an important NPC's statistics; some players prefer to have every NPC completely defined with stats, skills, and gear, while others define only what is immediately necessary and fill in the rest as the game proceeds. There is also some debate regarding the importance of fully defined NPCs in any given role-playing game, but there is consensus that the more "real" the NPCs feel, the more fun players will have interacting with them in character.

=== Dependants ===
Many game systems have rules for characters sustaining positive allies in the form of NPC followers, hired hands, or other dependents stature to the PC (player character). Characters may sometimes help in the design, recruitment, or development of NPCs.

In the Champions game (and related games using the Hero System), a character may have a DNPC, or "dependent non-player character". This is a character controlled by the GM, but for which the player character is responsible in some way, and who may be put in harm's way by the PC's choices.

== Video games ==
The term "non-player character" (NPC) is also used in video games to describe game characters and entities that are not under the direct control of a player, and often carries a connotation that the character is not hostile towards players; hostile characters, on the other hand, are referred to as enemies, mobs, grunts or creeps. A mob, also known as a mobile, or mobile object, might encompass all NPCs in a MMORPG or MUD. In most modern graphical games, "mob" may be used to specifically refer to generic monstrous NPCs that a player is expected to hunt and kill, excluding NPCs that engage in dialog, sell items, or NPCs which cannot be attacked. Most mobs are capable of no complex behaviors beyond attacking or moving around. "Named mobs" are distinguished by having a proper name rather than being referred to by a general type ("a goblin", "a citizen", etc.).

The term non-player character refers to a character that is not controlled by a player, as distinct from a player character (PC). However, it does not necessarily imply that the character is permanently unplayable. Some video games allow for the player to take control of NPCs (such as Grand Theft Auto V which allows the player to switch between the three main protagonists) at which point the NPC gains PC status. The acronym NPC is sometimes expanded as "non-playable character", however a non-playable character is one that cannot be selected or controlled by a player at any point in the game.

NPC behavior in computer games is usually scripted and automatic, triggered by certain actions or dialogue with the player characters. In certain multiplayer games (Neverwinter Nights and Vampire: The Masquerade series, for example) a player that acts as the GM can "possess" both player and non-player characters, controlling their actions to further the storyline. More complex games, such as the aforementioned Neverwinter Nights, allow the player to customize the NPCs' behavior by modifying their default scripts or creating entirely new ones.

In some online games, such as massively multiplayer online role-playing games, NPCs may be entirely unscripted, and are essentially regular character avatars controlled by employees of the game company. These "non-players" are often distinguished from player characters by avatar appearance or other visual designation, and often serve as in-game support for new players. In other cases, these "live" NPCs are virtual actors, playing regular characters that drive a continuing storyline (as in Myst Online: Uru Live).

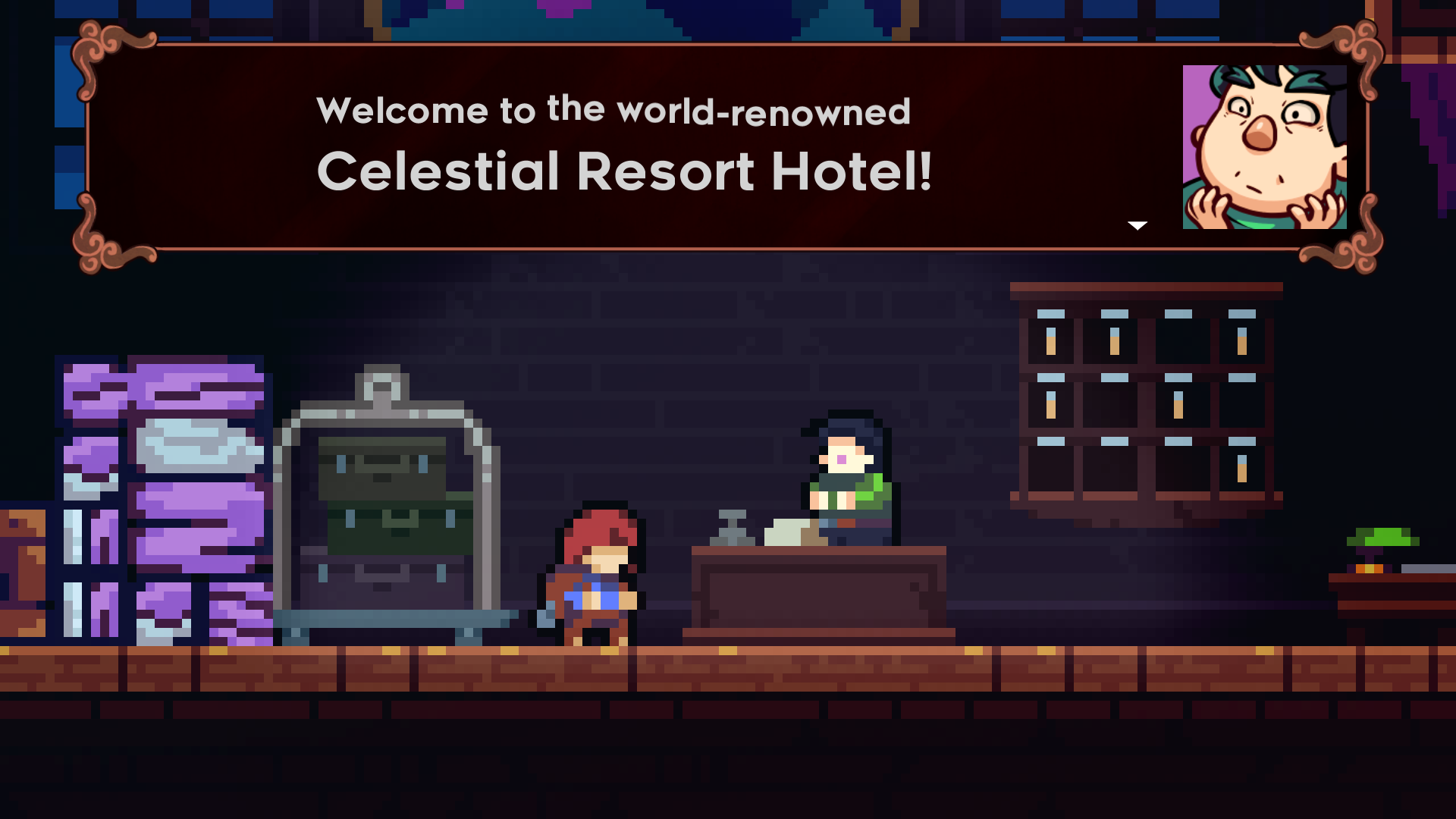
An NPC with dialogue in the game Celeste

In earlier RPGs, NPCs only had monologues. This is typically represented by a dialogue box, floating text, cutscene, or other means of displaying the NPCs' speech or reaction to the player. NPC speeches of this kind are often designed to give an instant impression of the character of the speaker, providing character vignettes, but they may also advance the story or illuminate the world around the PC. Similar to this is the most common form of storytelling, non-branching dialogue, in which the means of displaying NPC speech are the same as above, but the player character or avatar responds to or initiates speech with NPCs. In addition to the purposes listed above, this enables the development of the player character.

More advanced RPGs feature interactive dialogue, or branching dialogue (dialogue trees). An example are the games produced by Black Isle Studios and White Wolf, Inc.; every one of their games is multiple-choice roleplaying. When talking to an NPC, the player is presented with a list of dialogue options and may choose between them. Each choice may result in a different response from the NPC. These choices may affect the course of the game, as well as the conversation. At the least, they provide a reference point to the player of their character's relationship with the game world.

Ultima is an example of a game series that has advanced from non-branching (Ultima III: Exodus and earlier) to branching dialogue (from Ultima IV: Quest of the Avatar and on). Other role-playing games with branching dialogues include Cosmic Soldier, Megami Tensei, Fire Emblem, Metal Max, Langrisser, SaGa, Ogre Battle, Chrono, Star Ocean, Sakura Wars, Mass Effect, Dragon Age, Radiant Historia, and several Dragon Quest and Final Fantasy games.

Certain video game genres revolve almost entirely around interactions with non-player characters, including visual novels such as Ace Attorney and dating sims such as Tokimeki Memorial, usually featuring complex branching dialogues and often presenting the player's possible responses word-for-word as the player character would say them. Games revolving around relationship-building, including visual novels, dating sims such as Tokimeki Memorial, and some role-playing games such as Persona, often give choices that have a different number of associated "mood points" that influence a player character's relationship and future conversations with a non-player character. These games often feature a day-night cycle with a time scheduling system that provides context and relevance to character interactions, allowing players to choose when and if to interact with certain characters, which in turn influences their responses during later conversations.

In 2023, Replica Studios unveiled its AI-developed NPCs for the Unreal Engine 5, in cooperation with OpenAI, which enable players to have an interactive conversation with unplayable characters. "NPC streaming"—livestreaming while mimicking the behaviors of an NPC—became popular on TikTok in 2023 and was largely popularized by livestreamer Pinkydoll.

=== Purpose of mobs ===
Defeating mobs may be required to gather experience points, money, items, or to complete quests. Combat between player characters (PCs) and mobs is called player versus environment (PvE). PCs may also attack mobs because they aggressively attack PCs. Monster versus monster (MvM) battles, in which two monsters fight each other, also take place in some games.

=== Etymology ===
The term "mobile object" was used by Richard Bartle for objects that were self-mobile in MUD1. Later source code in DikuMUD used the term "mobile" to refer to a generic NPC, shortened further to "mob" in identifiers. DikuMUD was a heavy influence on EverQuest, and the term as it exists in MMORPGs is derived from the MUD usage. The term is an abbreviation, not an acronym.

== Other usage ==
From around 2018, the term NPC became an insult, primarily online, to suggest that a person is unable to form thoughts or opinions of their own. This is sometimes illustrated with a grey-faced, expressionless version of the Wojak meme.

== Monetization ==
NPC streaming is a type of livestream that allows users to participate in and shape the content they are viewing in real time. It has become widely popular as influencers and users of social media platforms such as TikTok utilize livestreams to act as non-player characters.

"Viewers in NPC live streams take on the role of puppeteers, influencing the creator's next move." This phenomenon has been on the rise as viewers are actively involved in what they are watching, by purchasing digital "gifts" and sending them directly to the streamer. In return, the streamer will briefly mimic a character or act.

This phenomenon has become a trend starting from July 2023, as influencers make profits from this new internet character. Pinkydoll, a TikTok influencer, gained 400,000 followers the same month that she started NPC streaming, while her livestreams began to earn her as much as $7,000 in a day. NPC streaming gives creators a new avenue to earn money online. Despite this, certain creators are quitting due to certain stigmas that come with the strategy. For example, a pioneer of the NPC trend, Malik Ambersley has been robbed, accosted by police, and been in fights due to the controversial nature of his act.

== See also ==
- AI player
- Philosophical zombie
- Video game bot
