= Muirigo =

Muirigo is a village in Kenya. A Muirigo Primary School exists. Muirigo belongs to Thika, Gatundu North. Other informal settlements in the Nairobi area include Huruma, Kiambiu, Korogocho, Mukuru and Kibera.
