= Buruburu =

Housing estate in Kenya

Buruburu is a housing estate within Nairobi City County in Kenya. Buruburu is a vast development inhabited by middle-class people. The estate was designed in 1974 and comprises six phases, with the fifth completed in the mid-1980s. The estate is an expansive settlement which spreads over 85 ha, and located 8 km outside the Nairobi Central Business District. Due to its proximity to the city, the estate has attracted populations from every walk of life. This has led to the proliferation of trade and other home-based enterprises (HBEs) in the estate. The houses in Buruburu resemble modern architecture of white buildings with striking orange tiled roof tops. Buruburu gave rise to modern-day Sheng, a language spoken by virtually all of Nairobi's youth.

== History ==
Buruburu was built for middle-income populations during the 1970s and 1980s and inhabited by Kenyan business people, government officials, professionals and a few expatriates on short-term assignments. The estate has been built on area historically associated with low-income groups. Prior to the establishment of the estate the post-colonial government had built rental housings that predominantly attracted high-income groups. Buruburu estate was established to abandon rental housing policy in favor of home ownership through tenant purchase and mortgage programs. The program was based on five phases and took ten years to complete in 1983.

The origins of Buruburu estate can be traced back to the 1962 Regional Commission which advocated the eastward expansion of Nairobi for housing and development. The program was earmarked for the Nairobi emerging middle-class, and adopted the mortgage housing finance strategy. The Buruburu program also marked the government's policy shift from rental and tenant purchase housing schemes. In the designing and planning of the Buruburu estate, the key institutional actors were Nairobi City Council (NCC); the Central Government; and, the British Commonwealth Development Corporation (CDC).

The estate comprises five phases of 1000 units each. The houses were mainly two storey maisonettes with 3-4 bedrooms, and 2-3 bedroom bungalows.

== Infrastructure ==
The plots' sizes in Buruburu vary from 6 to 10.5 meters in width, and 20 to 24 meters in length. This ratio of 1:3 to 1:4 falls under the guidelines and recommendations of Urbanization Primer. The estate consists of five phases. Each phase house an average of 943 dwellings that vary in scale from 2 to 4 bedrooms in each dwelling unit.

Burburu has a wide range of infrastructure, including medical institutions, banks, educational institutions, churches, a mall and a variety of shops. There are three main roads: Rabai Road, Jogoo Road and Mumias South Road.

== Education ==
There are many private preschools in Buruburu, as well as many of public and private primary and secondary education schools. There are several tertiary institutions, including the East African school of Theology, IAT, Shepherds college, AUSI, Buruburu Institute of Fine Arts, SOS Technical Institute and unity College.

== Urban and illegal sprawl ==
Since its completion, Buruburu has experienced massive constructions and extensions which mostly do not follow the guidelines and regulations prescribed in the site coverage and plot ratio criteria. Research shows that about 60% of the extensions in the estate do not conform to the construction laws of the estate, while only 35% of the development works have been done with professional guidelines.
