= Kiuru =

Kiuru is a Finnish surname, meaning "skylark". Notable people with the surname include:

- August Kiuru (1922–2009), Finnish cross-country skier
- Pauli Kiuru (born 1962), Finnish triathlete and politician
- Krista Kiuru (born 1974), Finnish politician
- Tami Kiuru (born 1976), Finnish ski jumper
