= Ndambuki =

Ndambuki is a surname. Notable people with the surname include:

- Angela Ndambuki (born 1979), Kenyan lawyer and corporate executive
- Daniel Ndambuki (born 1977), Kenyan comedian
- Gideon Musyoka Ndambuki (born 1947), Kenyan politician
