= Ruai =

Area of Nairobi, Kenya

- Neighbourhood
- Location of Ruai in Kenya
- Coordinates: 01°15′19″S 36°59′10″E
- Country: Kenya
- County: Nairobi City
- Sub-county: Njiru

Area
  - Total: 28.8 sq mi (74.7 km^{2})

Population (2019)
  - Total: 72,134
  - Density: 2,500/sq mi (966/km^{2})

Ruai is a neighbourhood in east Nairobi. It is approximately 30 kilometres (19 mi) east of the central business district along Kangundo Road. It is one of the areas located in the east gate of Nairobi after Kamulu.

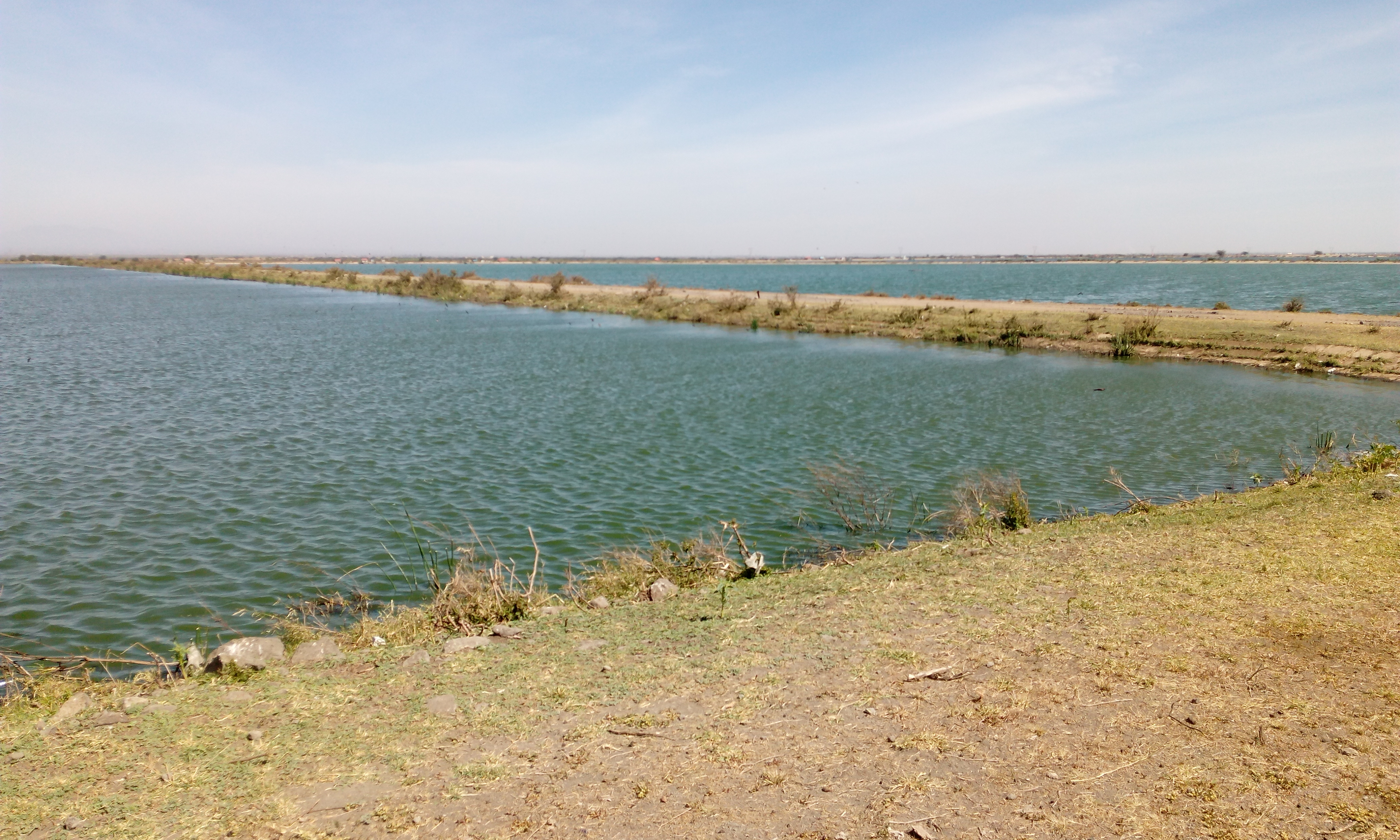
The Dandora Estate Sewage Treatment Plant in East Ruai

== Location ==
Ruai is located approximately 30 kilometres (19 mi) northeast of Nairobi's central business district and to the far East of Nairobi (Eastlands). It was formerly part of the larger defunct Embakasi division. It borders Utawala, Njiru and Kamulu. Electorally, Ruai county assembly ward, is placed under Kasarani Constituency; however, Ruai forms part of the larger sub-county of Njiru that spans through neighbourhoods as far as the Outer Ring Road to the furthest northeast up to Kamulu Bridge just before Joska.

== Overview ==
Ruai is largely an informal neighbourhood in Nairobi; though it is mixed-use in its corresponding urban area of Ruai Town. It is one of the least populated neighbourhoods in the city, especially the residential areas. The neighbourhood exhibits characteristics of a low-density suburb, having single-family dwellings as well as having a mix of a few storey buildings. Ruai also is home to the Dandora Estate Sewage Treatment Works, that treats 120,000m^{3}/day, about 80% of wastewater produced in Nairobi.

As per the 2019 census, Ruai has a population of 72,134, with 35,605 of them being male and 36,526 being female. The neighbourhood has a population density of 966/km^{2} in a land area of 74.7 km^{2}.
