= Kariobangi =

Commercial and residential suburb in Nairobi, Kenya

- Location of Kariobangi in Kenya
- Coordinates: 01°15′43″S 36°52′51″E
- Country: Kenya
- County: Nairobi City
- Sub-counties: Kasarani and Njiru

Area
  - Total: 2.5 km^{2} (0.97 sq mi)

Population (2019)
  - Total: 100,978
  - Density: 40,286/km^{2} (104,340/sq mi)

Kariobangi is a low-income residential estate in northeastern Nairobi. It consists of both apartments and slum-type dwellings. The name Kariobangi is believed to have come from an English phrase "Carry your bags" that was used by a white settler during the colonial period, that African natives mispronounced. It is split into two parts, Kariobangi North and Kariobangi South. The northern part was constructed first, with first buildings built in 1961. Kariobangi North is part of the Embakasi North electoral constituency. Kariobangi South is in the Embakasi West constituency. Kariobangi falls under two Nairobi sub-counties: with the north in Kasarani and the south in Njiru.

== Description ==
Kariobangi South Estate is straddled by the Outer Ring Road (on the Eastern part) and the Nairobi – Thika railway line on the Western and southerly parts. Outer Ring Road joins Kenya's main airport - the Jomo Kenyatta International Airport to the Thika Highway - via the GSU round-about on the North. It hosts the civil servants quarters. The neighbourhoods bordering this estate include Outer Ring Road Estate, Buruburu phase 1 extension and Pioneer Estates on the East (along the Outer Ring Road), Kariobangi North to the North, and Umoja to the South and South Eastern parts. The houses in this estate are varied in design and range from the flats, and maisonettes - including the famous red brick, timber houses (owned by the Nairobi city Council), to the privately owned bungalows.

The estate is served by one city council-maintained school - the Kariobangi South Primary school – and a number of nursery schools and kindergarten. Churches include a Catholic church; Presbyterian Church of East Africa (PCEA), Kariobangi South Parish; and the AIPCEA churches, all of which are within a stone's throw of each other, even though a number of other churches have since established a presence in the estate. The estate is also served by the city owned and run Kariobangi South Market, which previously catered for all the residents shopping-entertainment needs, but whose stature has of late been seriously eroded by the ever upcoming and rising mini-supermarkets and roadside kiosks.

As is common with most city council estates, the estate has suffered its share of maintenance neglect which coupled with uncoordinated housing extensions and new real estate developments by the so-called 'private developers' has threatened to make the estate lose its original identity and character. A number of former open -children- playgrounds have been grabbed and turned - overnight - into low-cost - both permanent and semipermanent - housing units. The highlight of this trend has been the development of an informal settlement estate 'slum', right next to the primary school. Other types of developments characteristic of the 'land grabbing mania' of the early to late 1990s include the low-cost housing units constructed in the previously vacant and sparse land area, which lies towards the north and eastern parts of the estate and which was earlier reserved for light industries/small-scale enterprises aimed at building an entrepreneurial base in the area - as a way of fighting poverty within the area and the city in general terms.

The land acquisition meant the development plan was never to be realized as intended as the land fell into the hands of private developers who have since developed it into residential estates. These developments were accompanied by security concerns, leading to the establishment of a chief's camp and an Administration Police post at the heart of the estate to curb reported crime. The F.C. Kariobangi Sharks are from here.

== Notable ==
Musicians from the estate include K-South, Bamboo Other notable personalities that have brought the estate to the national limelight include the former Miss Kenya, Yolanda Masinde, activist Cyrus Jirongo and comedian Ndambuki.
