= Nairobi City Council =

The City Council of Nairobi was the local authority governing the city of Nairobi, Kenya. It was the largest of the 175 local Authorities in the country and was under direction of the Ministry of Local Government.

The chief executive of the city council was the town clerk and was appointed by the Minister of Local Government. The non-executive branch of the council was headed by the mayor. The town clerk oversaw the functions of 17 main and 4 sub committees whose members were city councillors. Each committee is chaired by one councillor. The committees meet at scheduled meetings and adopt proposals by consensus. The proposals then pass through a full council for review. Proposals could only be approved as council resolutions by the Minister for Local Government having been reviewed by the full council.

The main offices of the Nairobi City Council were located at City Hall Plaza on City Hall Way. City Hall was constructed in the 1950s. At that time it was the tallest building in Nairobi, with its clock tower standing at 165 ft high. The building was expanded in 1981 with the addition of the 13-storey City Hall Annex.

Flag of Nairobi

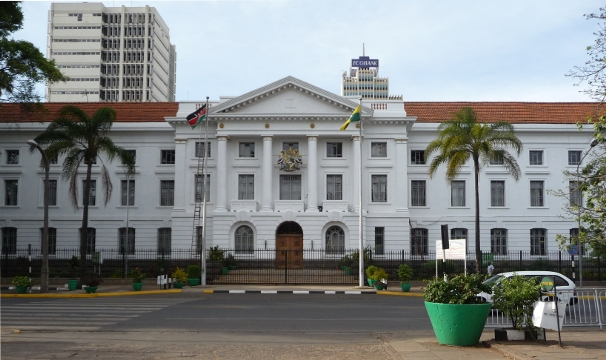
Nairobi CC

== History ==
In 1963 after Kenya achieved independence, the Nairobi Urban District Council, NUDC or simply UDC, became the City Council of Nairobi (CCN).^{2} The council was created by an act of Parliament, Cap 265 of the Laws of Kenya to provide services to residents of the city. Among other functions, the City Council was responsible for the provision of essential services like water, sewer and public safety. The First African Town Clerk of Nairobi is Lewis Wilkinson Kimani Waiyaki (Barrister at Law - Lincoln's Inn).

Charles Rubia was the first native African mayor of Nairobi.

== Structure and organization ==
The Executive branch of the city was headed by the town clerk. He oversaw the functions of the following: Most of these structures have changed.

1. Director - Public Health Department

2. Director - City Inspectorate Department

3. Director Environment Department

4. Assistant Director - Town Clerk’s Department

5. City Treasurer- City Treasury Department

6. City Engineer – City Engineer’s Department

7. Director- Education Department

8. Director -City Planning Department

9. Director -Housing Development Department

10. Director -Human Resource Department

11. Director – Procurement

12. Director -Legal Services

13. Director Investigations and Information Analysis—General Manager – Nairobi Water and Sewerage Company.

The policy formulation branch of the city was headed by the mayor, who oversaw the functions of the following committees.

1. General Purposes Committee

2. Education Committee

3. Social Services committee

4. Staff Committee

5. Public Health Committee

6. Water and Sewerage Committee

7. Internal Committee

8. Environment Committee

9. Works Committee

10. Inspectorate Committee

11. Town Planning Committee

12. Housing Development Committee

13. Joint Workers Committee

14. Joint Staff Committee

15. Finance Committee

16. Tender Committee

17. LASDAP Committee.^{3}

Sub-committees of the Council: Rental Housing Sub-committee

Property and Assets Sub-committee

Works Sub-Committee

Licensing Sub-Committee

Street Naming Sub-Committee

== Elections and representation ==
The city is divided into 8 divisions which also serve as Parliamentary Constituencies. Fifty-five city councillors were elected to represent wards in the 8 divisions. The councillors were elected by registered voters to serve five-year terms, after which they would seek re-election. After the elections, the party with the majority of councillors got to nominate 12 councillors, while the minority party nominates 8 councillors.^{4}

The mayor and deputy mayor were elected by the councillors to serve a two-year term, after which they could also seek reelection.

== Council divisions and wards ==
Division	No. of Wards	Ward Names
Makadara,	7	Harambee, Hamza/Lumumba, Makongeni, Mbotela, Nairobi South, Ofafa, Viwandani,
Embakasi,	11	Dandora, Embakasi/Mihango Kariobangi South, Kayole, Komarock, Mukuru-kwa Njenga, Njiru-Mwiki, Ruai, Savannah, Umoja
Kamukunji,	6	Eastleigh North, Eastleigh South, Kimathi, Muthurwa/Shauri Moyo, Pumwani, Uhuru
Dagoretti,	6	Kawangware, Kenyatta/Golf Course, Mutuini, Riruta, Uthiru/Ruthimitu Waithaka
Kasarani,	9	Githurai, Kahawa Kariobangi North, Kasarani, Korogocho, Mathare 4A, Roysambu Ruaraka, Utalii/Babadogo mwiki gachuru
Langata,	6	Karen/Langata, Kibera, Laini Saba, Mugumoini, Nairobi West, Serang’ombe
Starehe,	5	Central, Huruma, Kariokor, Mathare, Ngara
Westlands,	7	Highridge, Kangemi, Kileleshwa, Kilimani, Kitisuru, Mt. View, Parklands

== Corruption and problems facing the city ==
The City Council of Nairobi was responsible for providing services such as housing, healthcare facilities, primary education, emergency response, waste collection, water and sanitation among other services. Most residents however, feel that the city's ability to provide services was deteriorating and the local government was not effective enough in reducing corruption and poverty. Some vices related to corruption included:

- Informal settlements mostly slums and illegal structures mushrooming in the city.
- “Land grabbing”
- Water shortages in the city due to inadequate supplies.
- Uncontrolled dumping of waste.
- “Ghost employees” - non existing employees whose names appear on the city's payroll and receive pay regardless.
- Street Urchins
- Influx of Street Hawkers
- Bogus names Gazetted as elected Councillors.^{5}
- Shameful fights and brawls by Councillors at Council meetings

A history of corruption scandals has faced almost all the Nairobi City Council Mayors. Scandals ranging from illegal land sale/grabbing to funds misuse.

== See also ==
- Timeline of Nairobi
