= Embakasi East Constituency =

Constituency in Nairobi County, Kenya

Embakasi East
- constituency for the Parliament of Kenya
- Embakasi East Constituency within Nairobi City County

- Nairobi City County within Kenya
- County: Nairobi City
- Area: 64.70 km^{2} (25.0 sq mi)

Current constituency
- Created: 2013
- Number of members: One
- Party: ODM
- Member of Parliament: Babu Owino
- Created from: Embakasi

Embakasi East is a constituency in Kenya. It is one of seventeen constituencies in Nairobi, with an area of 64.70 km^{2} (25.0 sq mi). Embakasi East includes five electoral wards: Upper Savannah, Lower Savannah, Embakasi, Utawala and Mihango.And current MP or Member of Parliament is Babu Owino Who was elected for two terms Following 2017 Kenyan general election And Winning Second term in the 2022 Kenyan general election Serving 9 years as MP.
