= Dandora =

Landfill in East Africa

Coordinates: 1°15′S 36°54′E

Dandora is a neighbourhood in Kenya's capital and largest city, Nairobi. It is part of the Embakasi division. Dandora was established in 1977, with partial financing from the World Bank to provide a higher standard of housing..

Surrounding neighbourhoods include Kariobangi, Baba Dogo, Gitare Marigo, Kayole, Mathare, and Korogocho.

== Dump site ==
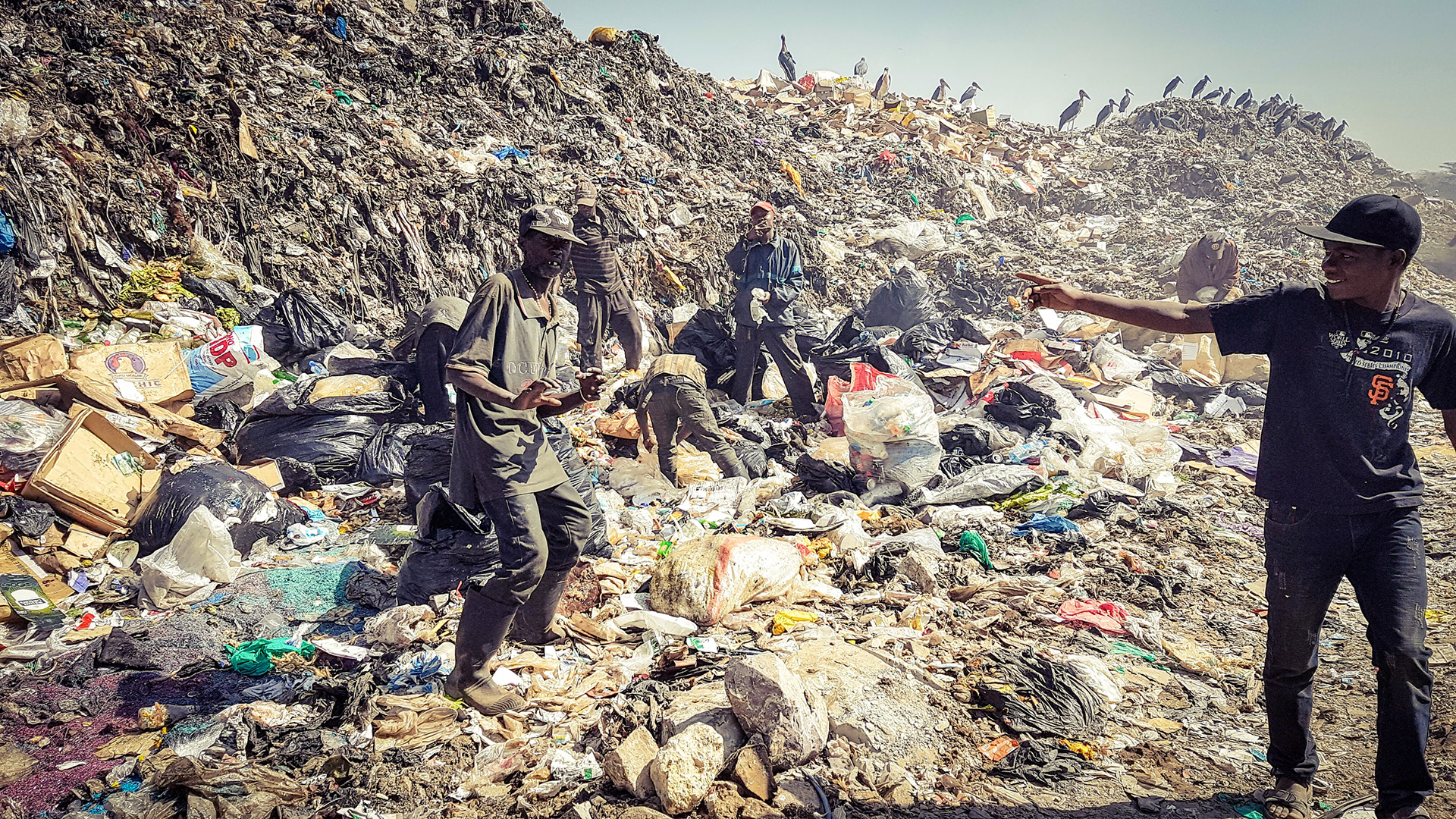
Dandora dumpsite

Nairobi's principal dumping site is situated in Dandora. The Dandora Oxygenation Ponds, a prominent feature on satellite imagery of the area, is Nairobi's main sewage treatment works, and discharges processed water into the Nairobi River. Dandora is divided into 5 phases. Crime thrives here due to high rate of school drop out and the city's dumpsite. The dumpsite is an environmental hazard. The burning of the waste during the night can cause choking. Houses nearing the site are filled with smoke making it hard to breathe.

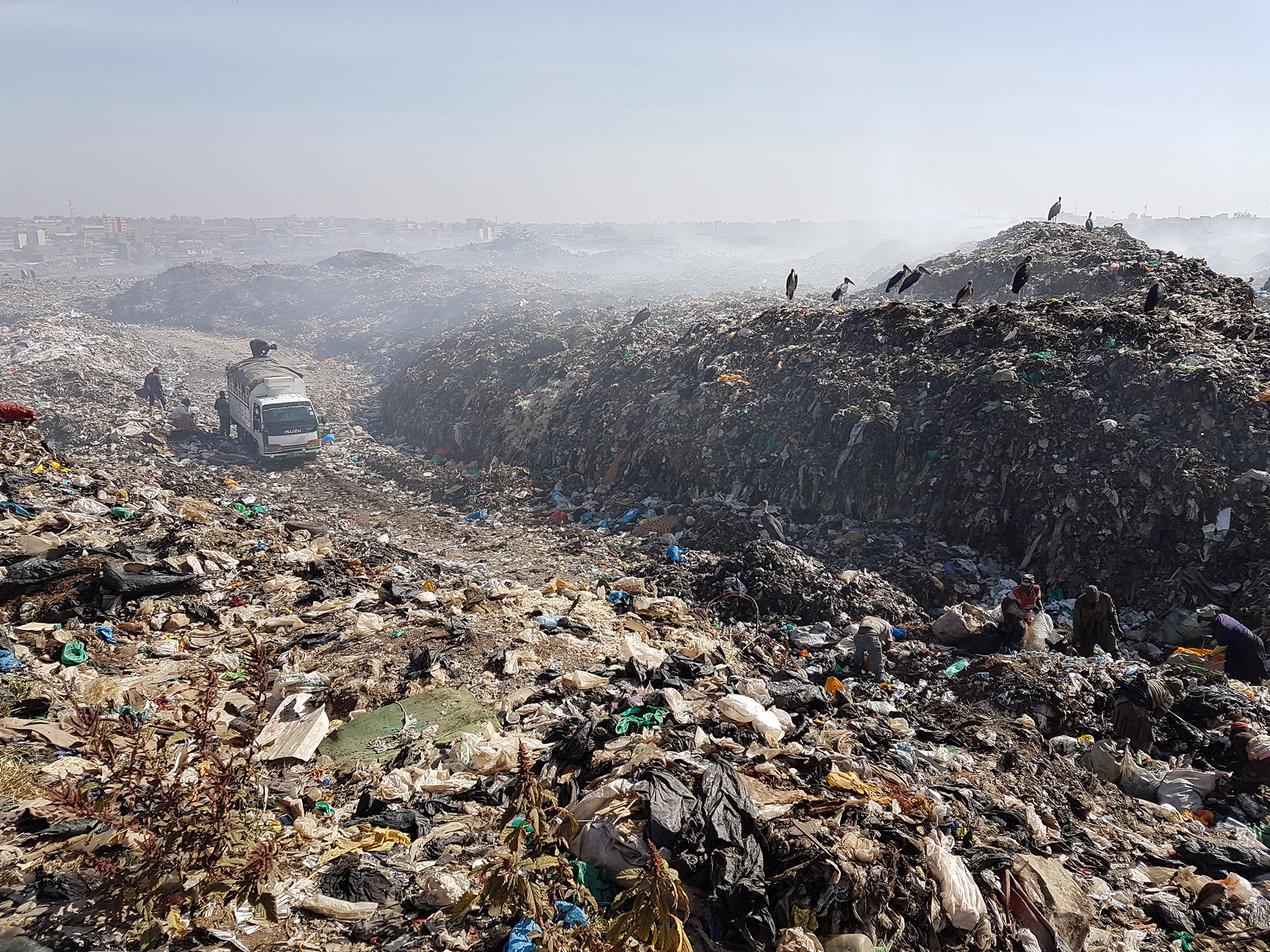
Dandora dumpsite from above

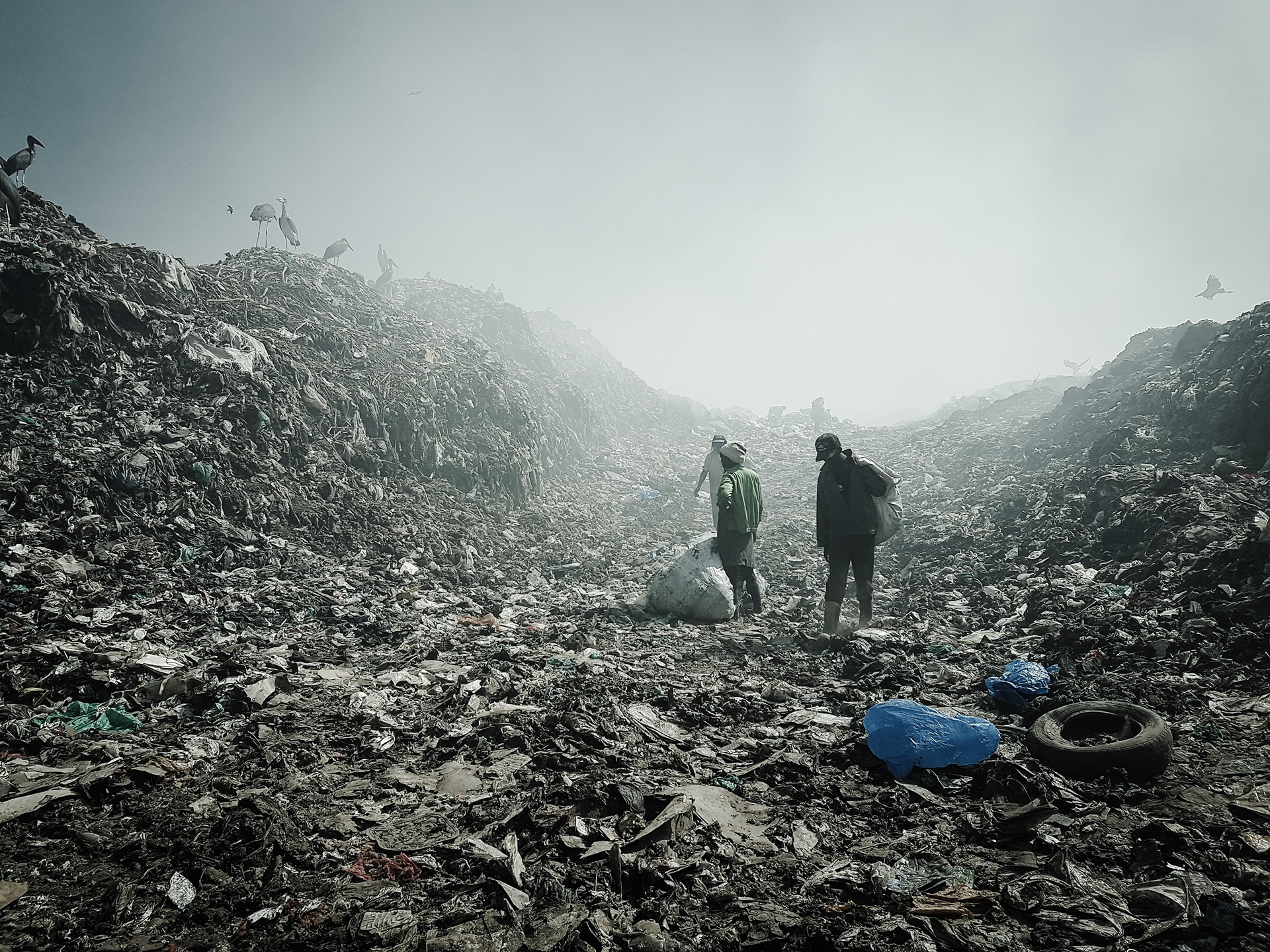
Dandora: largest dumpsite in east Africa

At the dumping site, many people experience health risks. For example, skin diseases are common for a big part of the people living there. Moreover, there are many resources of toxic waste. Inhabitants could experience health effects of this because the toxic substances that are in for example e-waste could end up in the air. Due to this, air pollution can emerge. Behind this, people without access to a job pick waste to sell. Through this, there is a possibility of income.

Besides the health risks that emerge due to waste, more hazards are apparent. Crime rates are high and in some parts of the waste dump, police do not keep watch. Another risk can be seen in food insecurity. Because of a lack of proper food, people search for food in the waste. Eating food that is found in the waste could be dangerous for the health of the people living at Dandora. Furthermore, many children who are living at the waste dump have no access to education.
