= Pinkydoll =

Canadian internet personality

- Born: Fedha Sinon; 1991 or 1992 (age 34–35)
- Occupations: Livestreamer; internet personality
- Years active: 2023–present
- Known for: Viral NPC livestreams on TikTok

Fedha Sinon, better known by her online alias Pinkydoll, is a Canadian internet personality and online TikTok streamer. In 2023, she went viral for her non-player character (NPC) TikTok livestreams, in which she reacts to gifts sent to her with repetitive phrases and motions.

== Life and career ==
Before starting her social media career, Fedha Sinon worked as a stripper and webcam model. She ran a cleaning company in Montreal, but lost the company after traveling to Seychelles for her stepfather's funeral. Looking for a new way to make money, Sinon began livestreaming under the name Pinkydoll on TikTok. Starting in January 2023, after a commenter wrote that she looked like a non-player character in a video game, she began "NPC streaming", a phenomenon in which livestreamers on TikTok react to tips sent to them as cartoon "gifts" with repetitive, mechanical movements and phrases as though they were a non-player character. She often streamed while popping popcorn using a hair straightener and partially based her persona on NPCs from the video game series Grand Theft Auto after watching others play it.

Screen recordings of Pinkydoll's livestreams on TikTok went viral on social media in July 2023 as phrases from her livestreams, such as "ice cream so good" in response to the ice cream cone gift and "gang gang" in response to the GG gift, became memes. The virality of her livestreams prompted a rise in NPC streamers using her phrases as well as parodies of her. Her TikTok account reached 400,000 followers that same month, while her livestreams began to earn her as much as $7,000 in a day as they reached hundreds of thousands of viewers, including Timbaland and ATL Jacob, two of her top viewers during one of her livestreams. Her appeal has been attributed by critics to the uncanny valley of her movements, the confusion caused by her persona, Pinkydoll's "star quality" and "voice like honey", a "surreal combination of sexiness and smooth videogame character body language", and her livestreams being considered fetish content. Also in July 2023, she received backlash after announcing she would be accepting a gig in Hollywood during the 2023 Hollywood labor disputes. By August 2023, she had more than one million followers on TikTok. While presenting at the 13th Streamy Awards in August 2023, social media users observed that her skin was darker than in her livestreams and accused her of "light skin fishing". Also in August 2023, she released the song "Ice Cream So Good" in collaboration with fashion retailer Fashion Nova.

== Personal life ==
Pinkydoll has one son.
