= Embakasi South Constituency =

Constituency in Nairobi County, Kenya

Embakasi South
- constituency for the Parliament of Kenya
- Embakasi South Constituency within Nairobi City County

- Nairobi County within Kenya
- County: Nairobi City
- Area: 12 km^{2} (4.6 sq mi)

Current constituency
- Created: 2013
- Number of members: One
- Party: Wiper
- Member of Parliament: Julius Mawathe
- Created from: Embakasi

Embakasi South is a constituency in Kenya. It is one of seventeen constituencies in Nairobi, with an area of 12 km^{2} (4.6 sq mi). Embakasi South includes five electoral wards: Imara Daima, Kwa Njenga, Kwa Rueben, Pipeline, and Kware.
