= Huruma =

Residential estate in Nairobi, Kenya

Coordinates: 1°15′S 36°52′E

Huruma is a low-income residential estate located in the northeast of Nairobi, the capital of Kenya. It borders Kariobangi and Dandora to the east, Moi Air Base to the south, Mathare to the north to west and Eastleigh to the southwest.

In April 2016, during Kenya's rainy season, a building collapse in Huruma resulted in the deaths of 52 people. The building's owner, Samuel Karanja Kamau, was charged with manslaughter.

== Notable residents ==
- George Hussein Onyango Obama - half-brother of US President with his nephew Ali Abubakar Otieno Barack Obama
