= Outer Ring Road, Nairobi =

Highway located in Nairobi

Coordinates: 1.263077°S 36.879066°E

The Outer Ring Road is a 13 kilometres (8.1 mi) multi-lane highway located in Nairobi, Kenya. Construction funding was initially provided by the African Development Bank in 2013, although construction delays and increased traffic have delayed completion of the project. The highway runs primarily along the Eastlands area of Nairobi and connects major transportation hubs including the Nairobi-Thika Highway, Mombasa Road, and the Jomo Kenyatta International Airport.

In August 2020, Kenya secured a $59 million (KSh6.4 billion) loan from the South Korean Export-Import Bank to build special lanes for high-capacity buses (bus rapid transit) to expand the road's carrying capacity.
