= Embakasi =

Neighbourhood in Nairobi, Kenya

- Location of Embakasi in Kenya
- Coordinates: 01°19′25″S 36°54′00″E
- Country: Kenya
- County: Nairobi City
- Sub-county: Embakasi

Embakasi is a neighbourhood in the city of Nairobi. It is approximately 18 kilometres (11 mi), southeast of the central business district. Embakasi is considered part of Nairobi's Eastlands area, lying to the south-east of Nairobi County. The Embakasi proper covers other estates in Eastlands such as Donholm, Pipeline, Tena, and Makadara estates. It borders South C and contains South B and slightly more than one third of Nairobi's Industrial Area and Export Processing Zones.

Jomo Kenyatta International Airport is located in Embakasi and it was known as Embakasi Airport when it was launched in 1958.

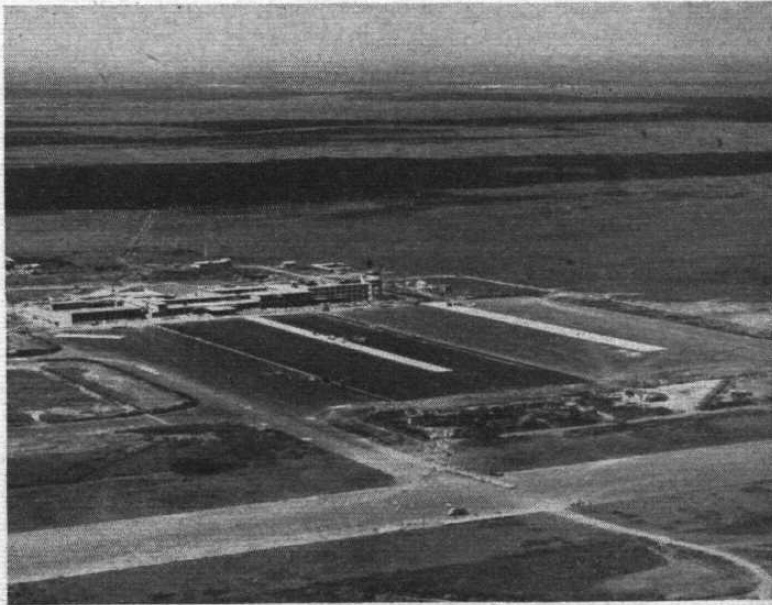
Airport in 1958

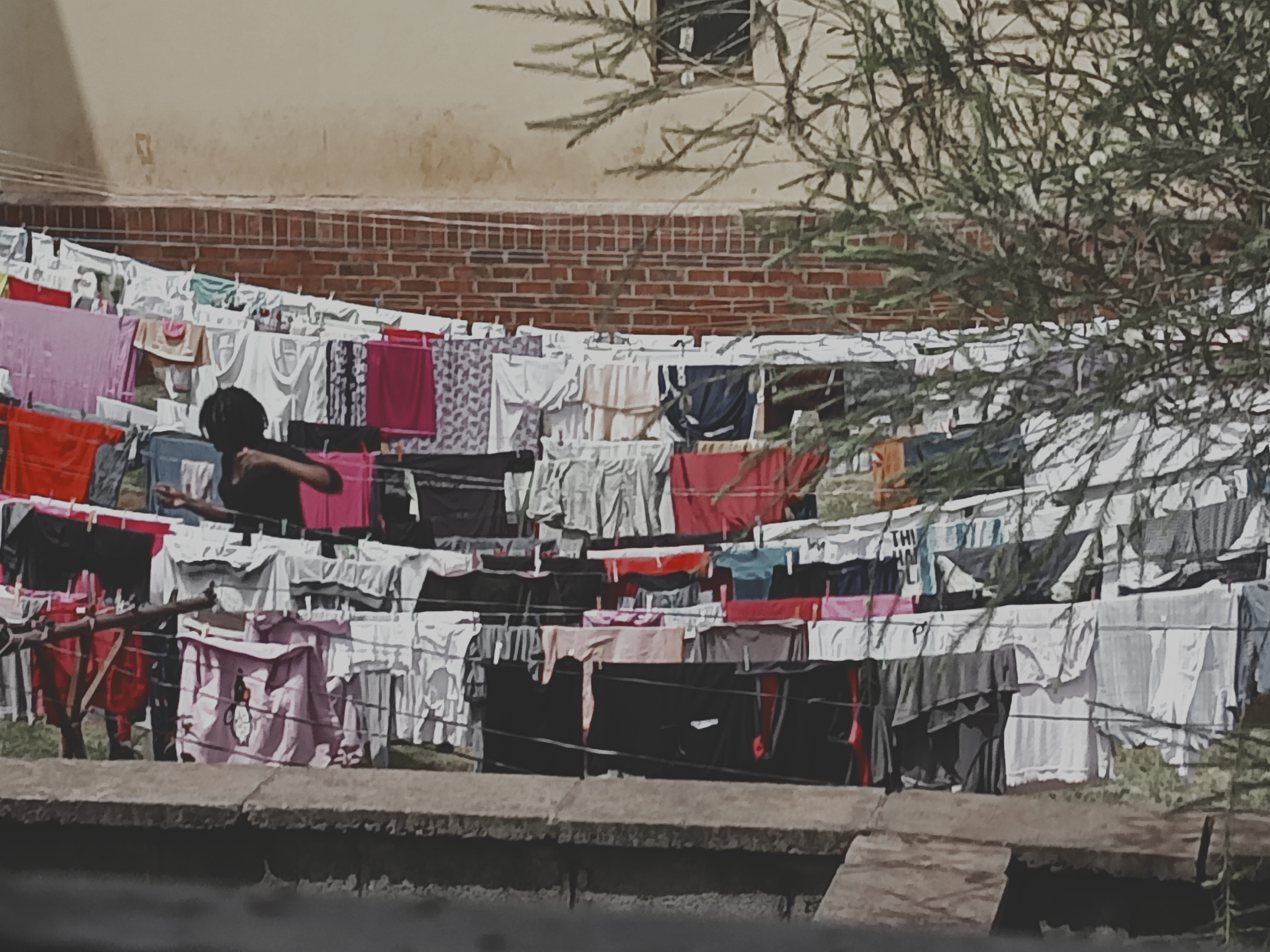
Laundry lines at an estate in Embakasi

== Embakasi Sub-county ==
The sub-county borrows its name from the neighbourhood and covers part of what was Embakasi Constituency, and is one of the eleven sub-counties in Nairobi. It has a land area of 86.3 km^{2} (33.3 sq mi). In the 2019 census, Embakasi had a population of 988,808, accounting for more than 22% of the total population of the county, and a population density of 11,460/km^{2}, making it the most populous of the sub-counties in Nairobi City County.

== Government and infrastructure ==
The Kenya Civil Aviation Authority has its head office on the property of Jomo Kenyatta International Airport in Embakasi. The Kenya Airports Authority also has its head office at the airport.

== Education ==
Kifaru Primary School is a basic educational facility situated in the Njiru Ward near the Umoja Ward. Our Lady Of Nazareth Primary School is catholic school located in Mkuru Kwa Njenga Other Schools in Embakasi Area

== Economy ==
Kenya Airways has its head office in Embakasi. African Express Airways has its head office on the grounds of Jomo Kenyatta International Airport in Embakasi. JetLink Express has its head office in the Freight Complex in Embakasi.

== Transport ==
Embakasi is the location of an Inland Container Depot popularly known as the dry port. Embakasi contains the bulk of the Nairobi portion of the Nairobi-Mombasa Highway. The Mombasa-Nairobi Standard Gauge Railway has a cargo station at Embakasi.

In 2010, a passenger railway branchline was proposed from Embakasi to Jomo Kenyatta International Airport to relieve overcrowding on the adjacent road.

As of 2022, a low-frequency, unidirectional commuter service was available from the Embakasi SGR station.

== 2011 petrol fire ==
In September 2011 at least 75 people burned to death after a petrol fire broke out in the division. The fire started when a fuel tank at a depot belonging to the Kenya Pipeline Company, spilled fuel into an open sewer running through Embakasi. Residents tried to scoop up fuel from the burst pipe and sewer, and were burned when the petrol ignited after someone threw a cigarette butt into the sewer.

== 2024 gas explosion ==
A gas blast killed at three people and injured nearly 300 on February 2, 2024, in Embakasi. At midnight a lorry carrying gas cylinders exploded and igniting a huge blaze raging close to blocks of flats. The Kenyan government initially said, the accident happened at a gas plant where workers were refilling gas cylinders. Local authorities later clarified that a truck had exploded in a parking yard. The responsible Kenyan Authority Epra stated, that the gas plant was illegal and that it had rejected three applications for construction permits to build a storage and filling facility at the site in Embakasi.

== See also ==
- Embakasi Constituency, electoral constituency in Nairobi
