= List of slums =

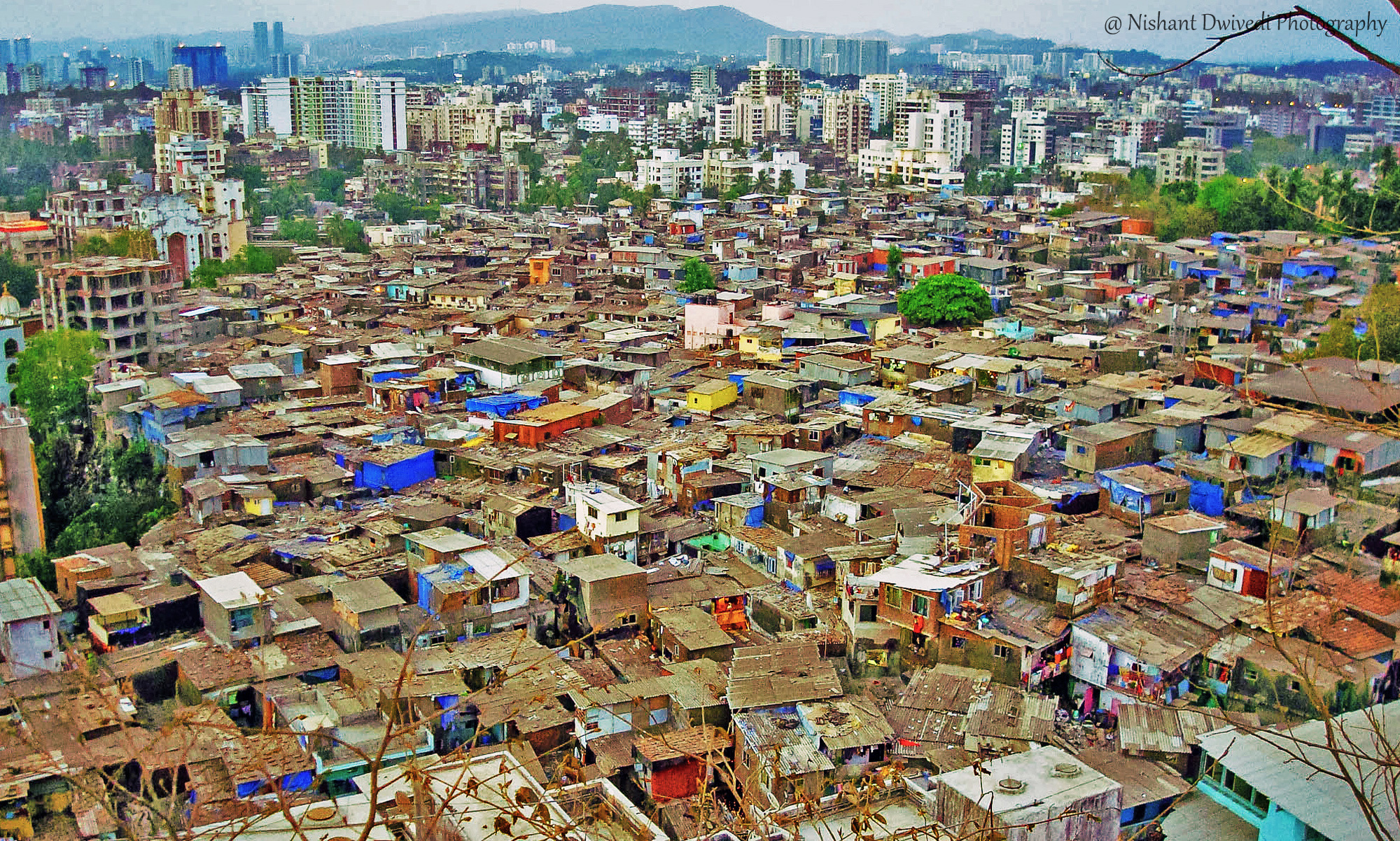
Slums and high-rise commercial buildings in Mumbai, India

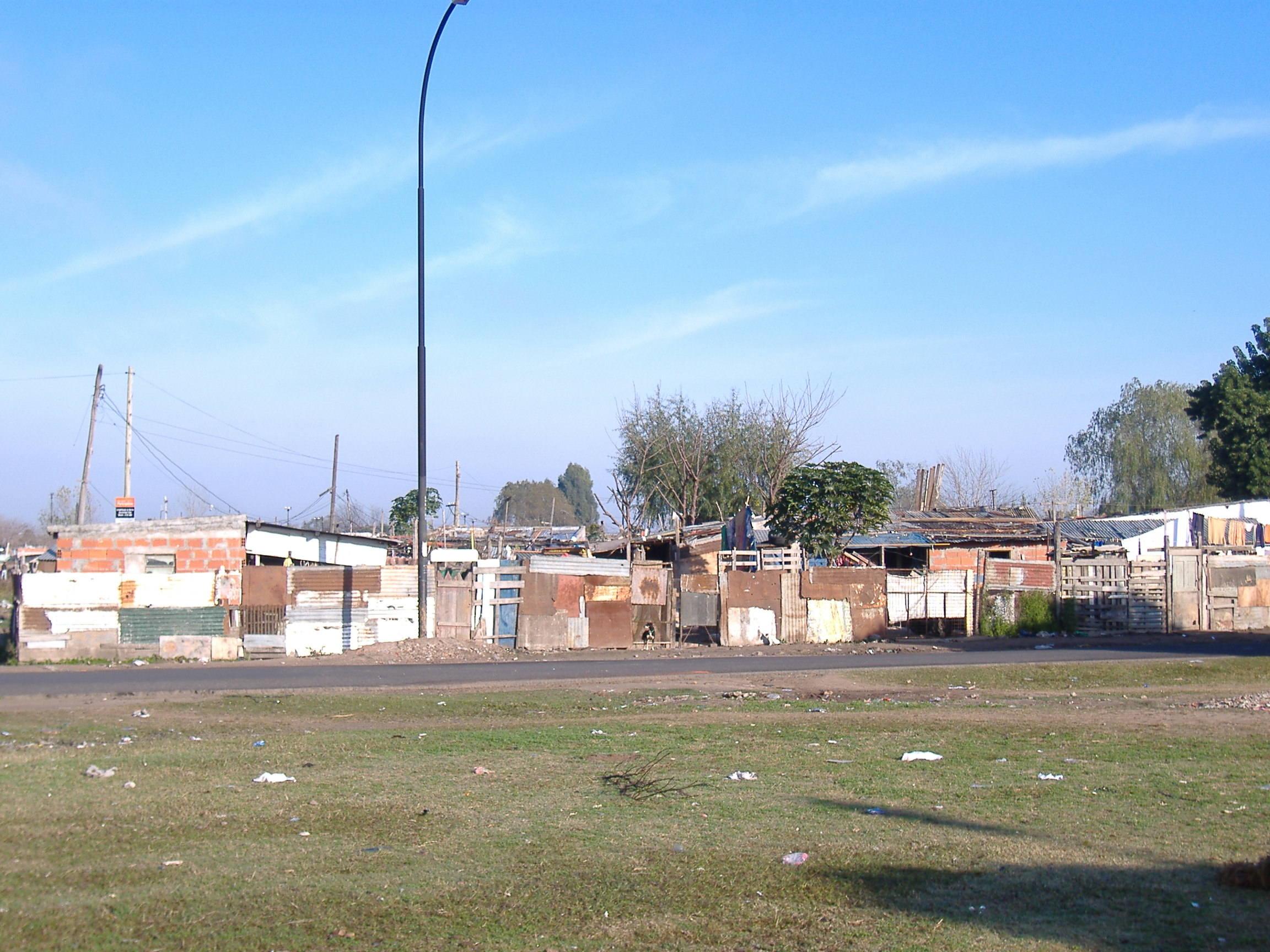
A Villa Miseria in Argentina

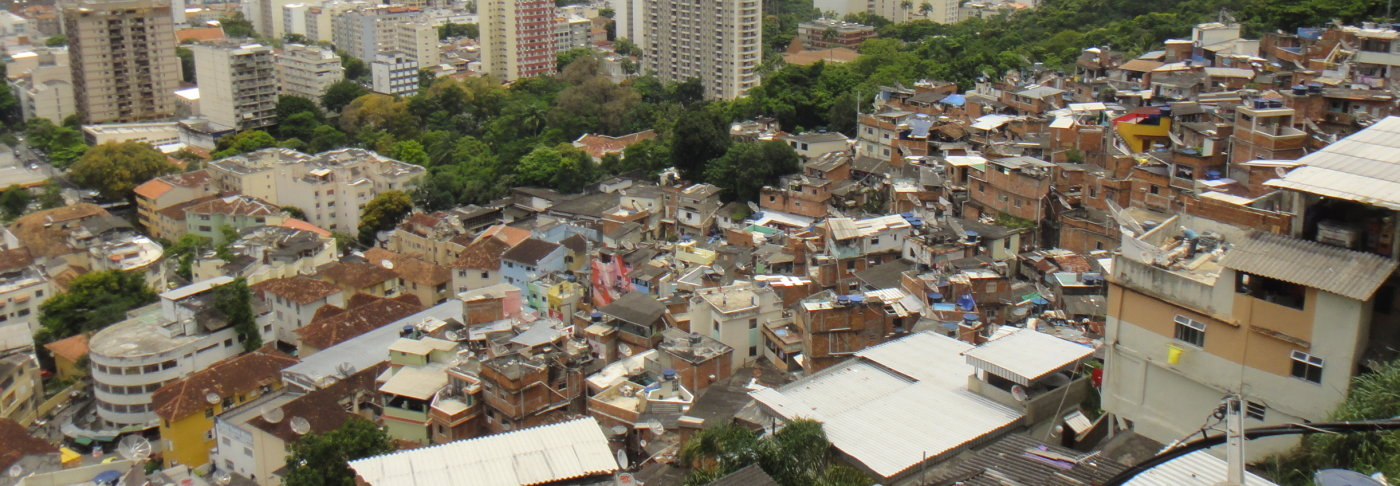
A favela in Brazil

This is a list of slums. A slum as defined by the United Nations agency UN-Habitat, is a run-down area of a city characterized by substandard housing, squalor, and lacking in tenure security. According to the United Nations, the percentage of urban dwellers living in slums decreased from 47 percent to 37 percent in the developing world between 1990 and 2005. However, due to rising population, and the rise especially in urban populations, the number of slum dwellers is rising. One billion people worldwide live in slums and the figure is projected to grow to 2 billion by 2030.

== Africa ==
=== Egypt ===
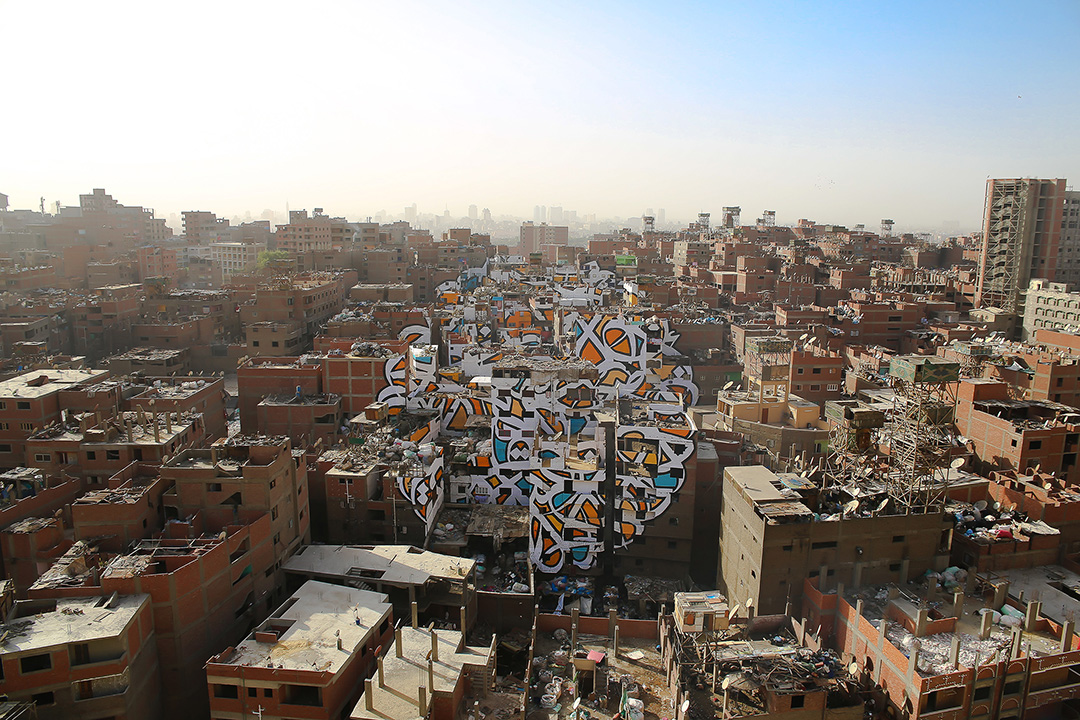
The Manshiyat Naser neighbourhood in Cairo, Egypt

- Ezbet el-Haggana, Cairo
- Manshiyat Naser, Cairo

=== Ghana ===
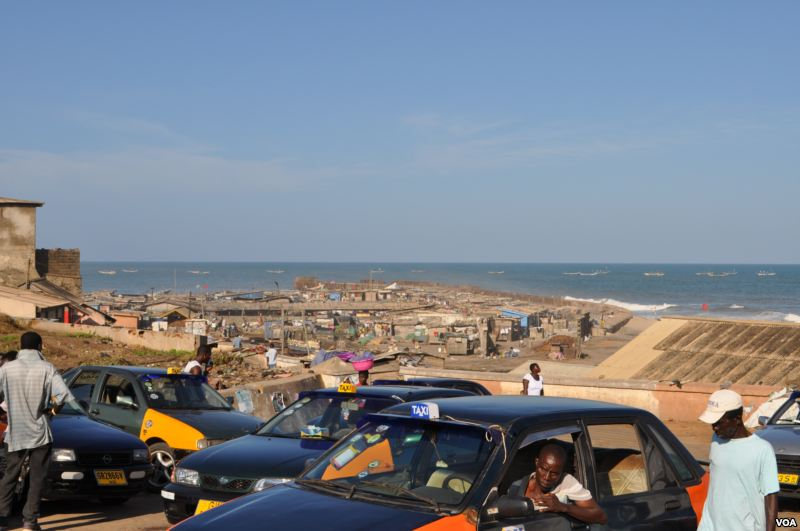
Taxi drivers waiting for fares near the beachfront slum in Accra's Jamestown

- Amui Djor
- Ashiaman
- Fadama
- Jamestown/Usshertown, Accra
- Kojokrom
- New Takoradi
- Suame Magazine
- Nima
- Agbogbloshie

=== Kenya ===
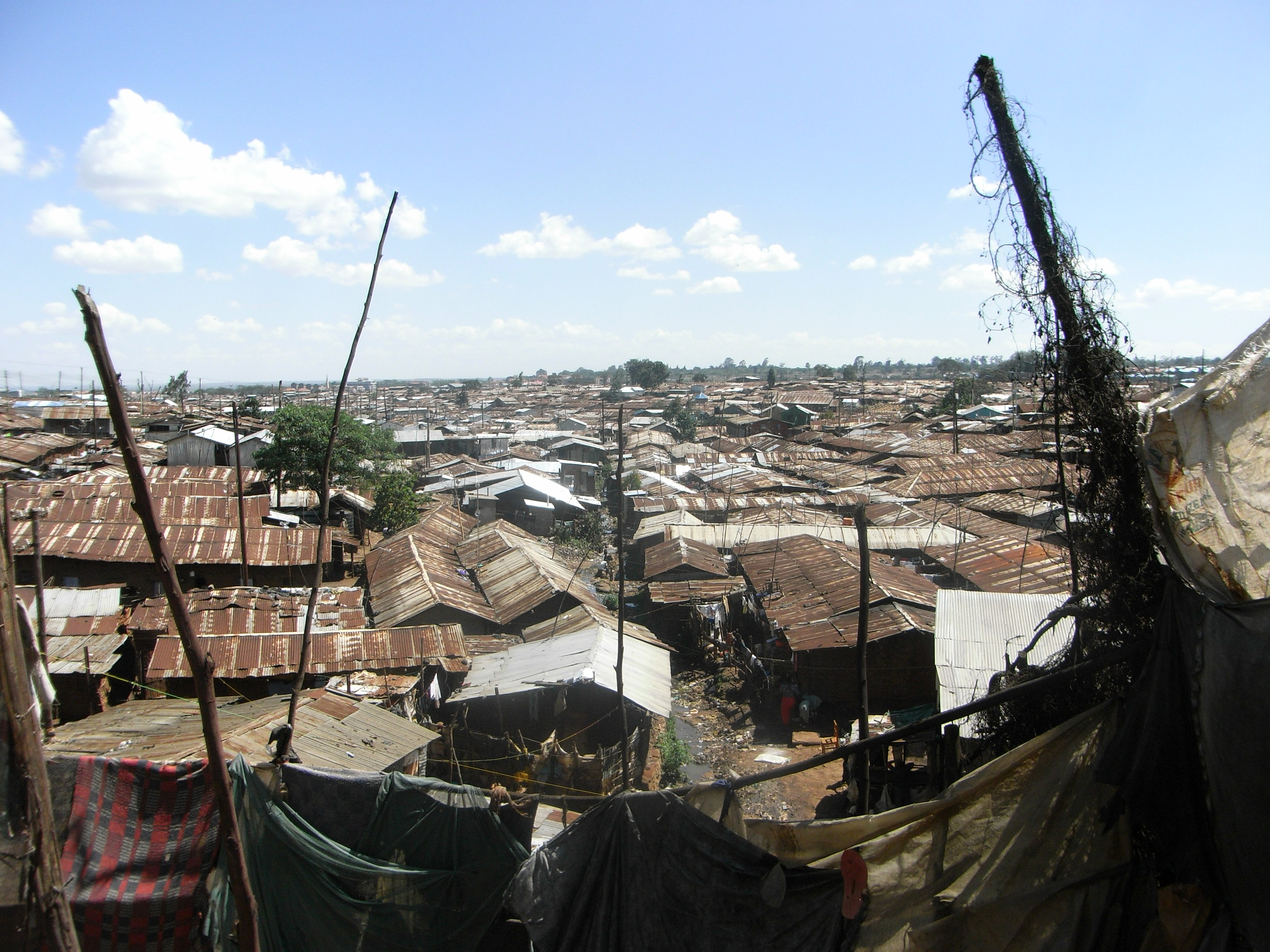
A view of Kibera, Nairobi

A view of Kibagare slum in Nairobi

- Baba Ndogo
- Dandora
- Fuata Nyayo
- Gatwekera
- Huruma
- Kambi Muru
- Kangemi
- Kawangware
- Kiambiu
- Kianda
- Kibera (described as the largest slum in Kenya)
- Kiamaiko
- Kichinjio
- Kisumu Ndogo
- Korogocho
- Laini Saba
- Lindi
- Majengo, Nairobi
- Juakali-Marurui, Nairobi
- Makongeni
- Mashimoni
- Matopeni
- Mathare
- Mathare Valley
- Mugumoini
- Mukuru kwa Njenga
- Mukuru slums
- Nyalenda
- Pumwani
- Raila
- Sarang'ombe
- Shilanga
- Siranga
- Soweto East
- Soweto West
- Ziwa la Ng'ombe
- Viwandani

=== Liberia ===
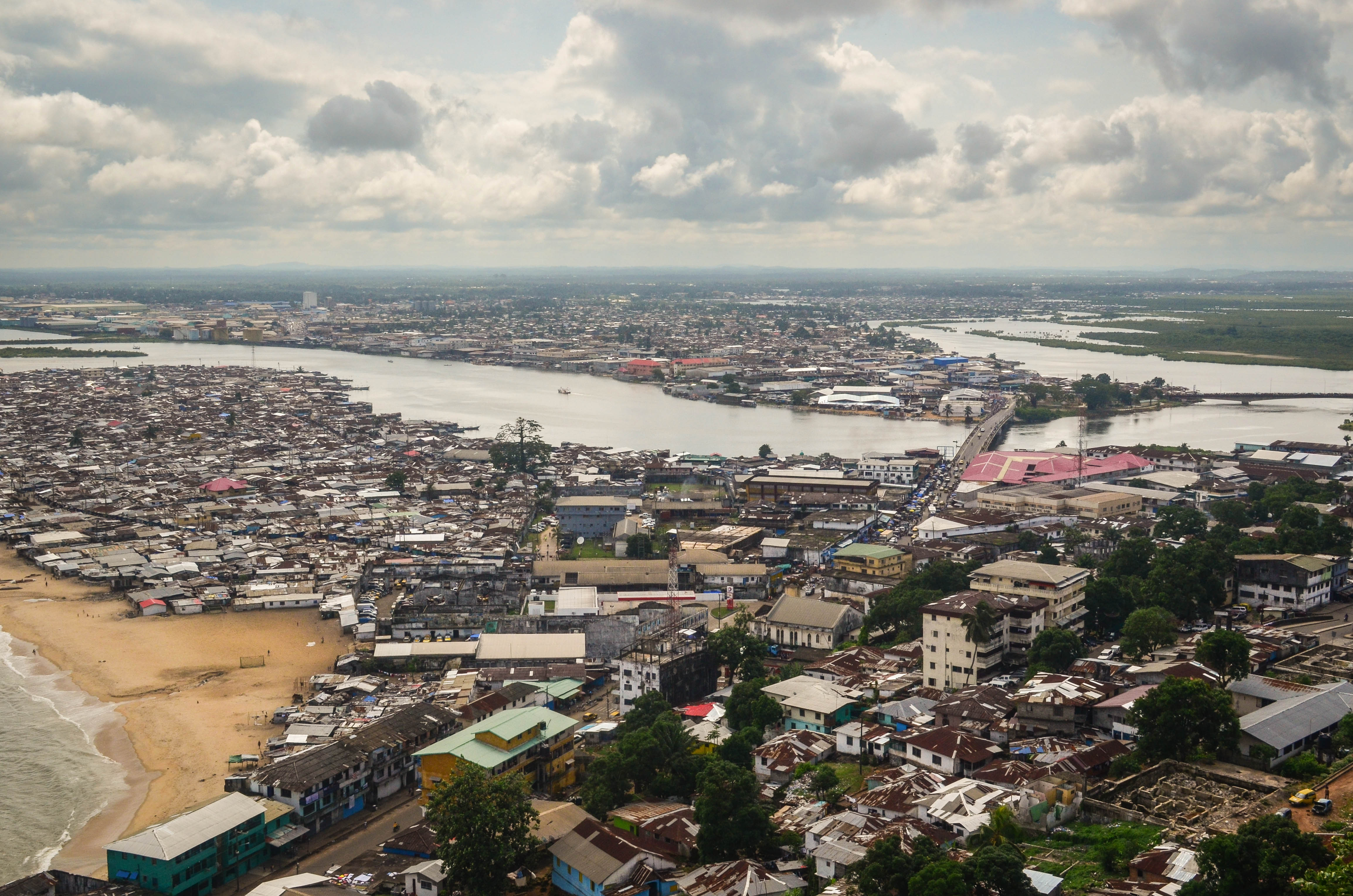
The Clara Town slum on Bushrod Island in Monrovia, Liberia, with West Point visible to the left.

- Brewerville
- Clara Town, Bushrod Island
- Logan Town
- Sinkor
- Slipway
- Sonewein
- South Beach Bay
- West Point

=== Mauritania ===
- Arafat
- Dar-Naim
- El Mina
- Sebkha
- Toujouonine

=== Namibia ===
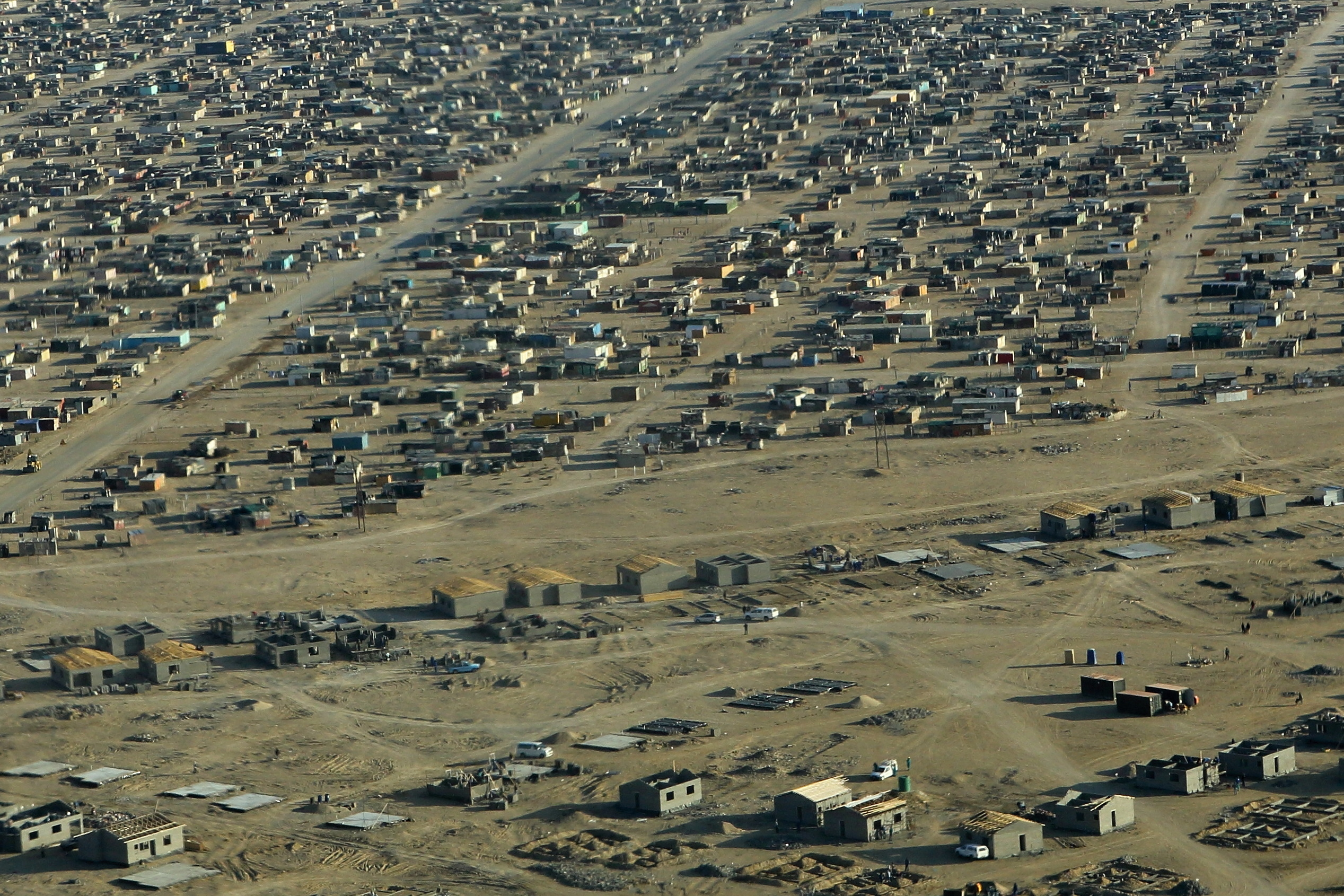
An informal settlement in Swakopmund

- Africa Tongashili
- Freedomland
- Goreangab
  - Kahumba ka Ndola
- Okahandja Park
- Okandundu
- Okantunda
- Okuryangava
- One Nation N° 1
- One Nation N° 2
- Ongulumbashe N° 1
- Onyika
- Otjomuise
- Samuel Maherero

=== Nigeria ===
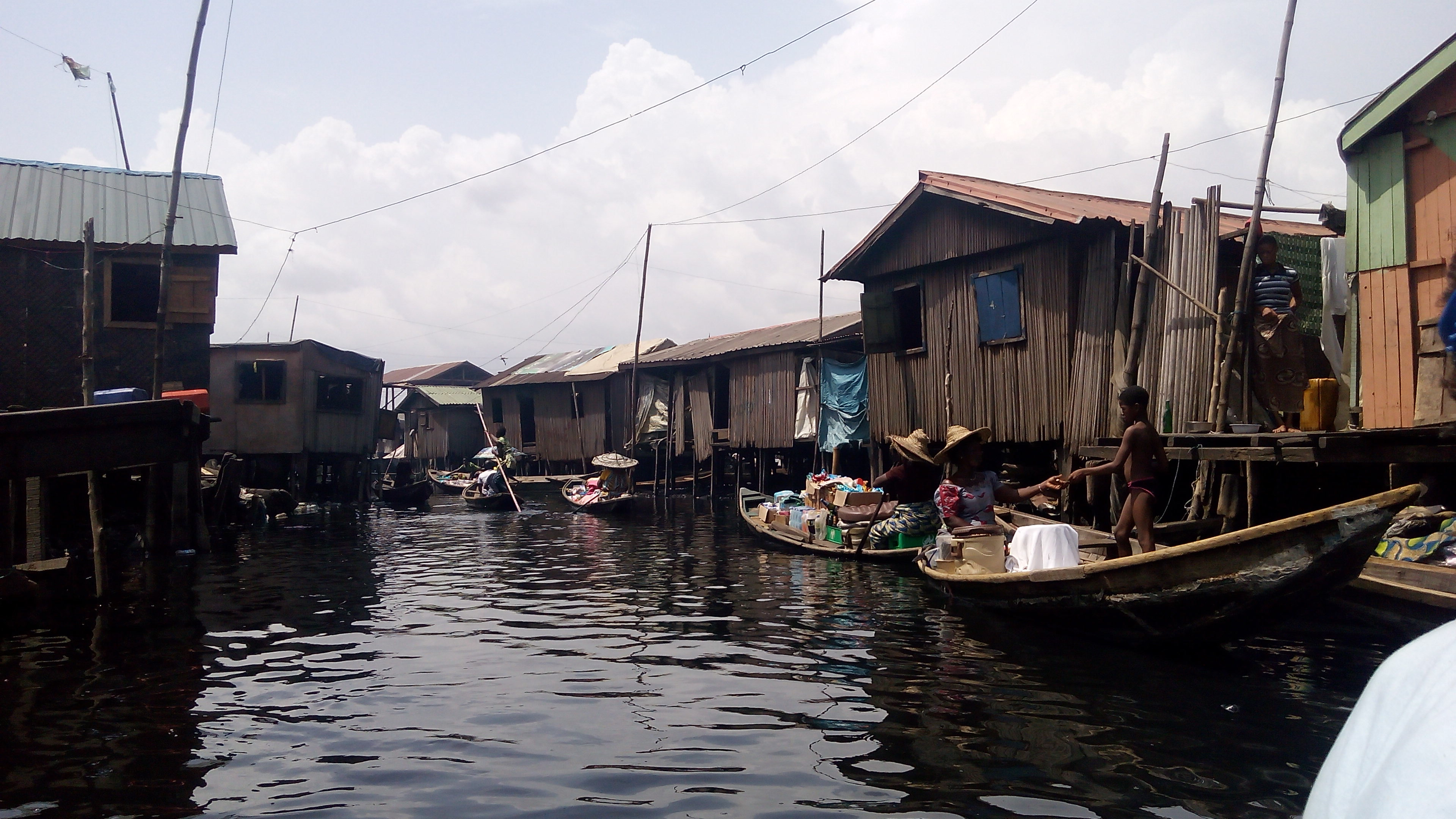
The Makoko waterfront slum in Lagos

- Agege
- Ajegunle
- Amukoko
- Badia
- Bariga
- Bodija
- Ijeshatedo/Itire
- Ilaje
- Iwaya
- Makoko
- Mushin
- Oke-Offa Babasale
- Somolu
- Idikan
- Sasa

=== South Africa ===
A residential area in Khayelitsha, a township in Cape Town

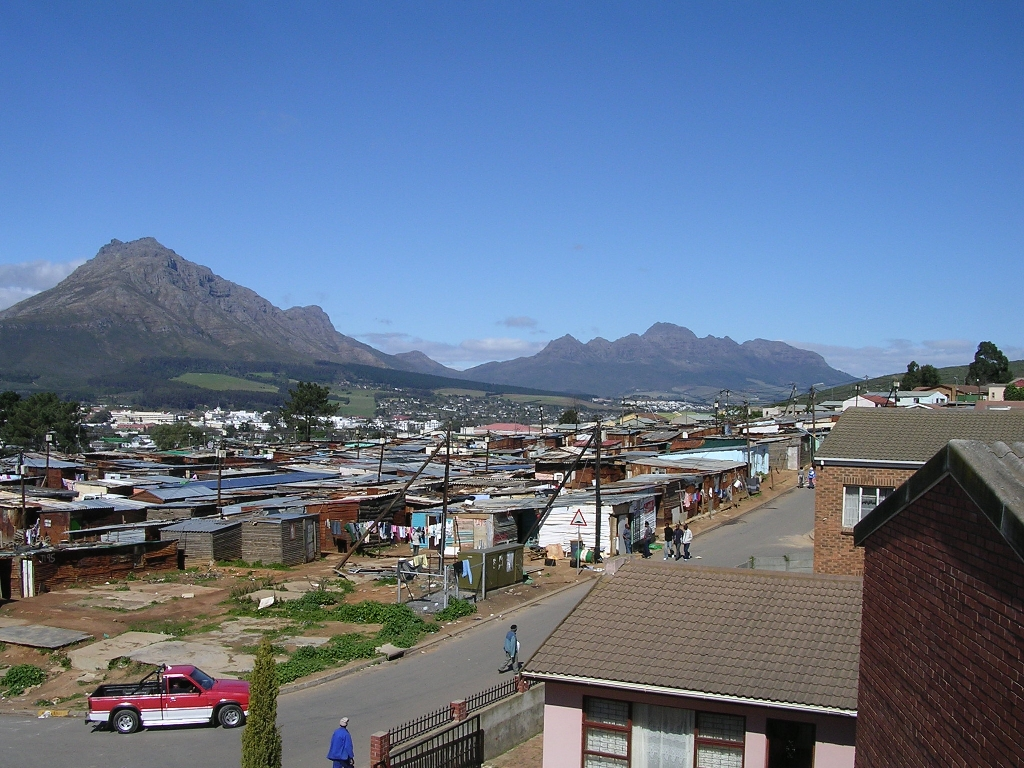
A view of Kayamandi, a township near Stellenbosch

A shanty town on the outskirts of Caledon, Western Cape

- Alexandra
- Cato Manor
- Chatsworth
- Fisantekraal
- Freedom Park
- Gamalakhe
- Gugulethu
- Ibhayi
- Inanda
- Joe Slovo Park
- Kennedy Road
- Khayelitsha
- KwaDabeka
- KwaMakhutha
- KwaMashu
- KwaNobuhle
- Langa
- Lwandle
- Mdantsane
- Mitchells Plain
- Motherwell
- Nomzamo
- Ntuzuma
- Nyanga
- Philippi
- Thembalethu
- Wallacedene

== Asia ==
=== Bangladesh ===
Aerial view of the Korail slum in Dhaka

- Begun Bari
- Duaripara (Dhaka North)
- Kawnia
- Korail slum (Dhaka North)
- Mohammadpur
- Monsur Beel / Nama Para

=== Hong Kong ===
- Kowloon Walled City (demolished)

=== India ===
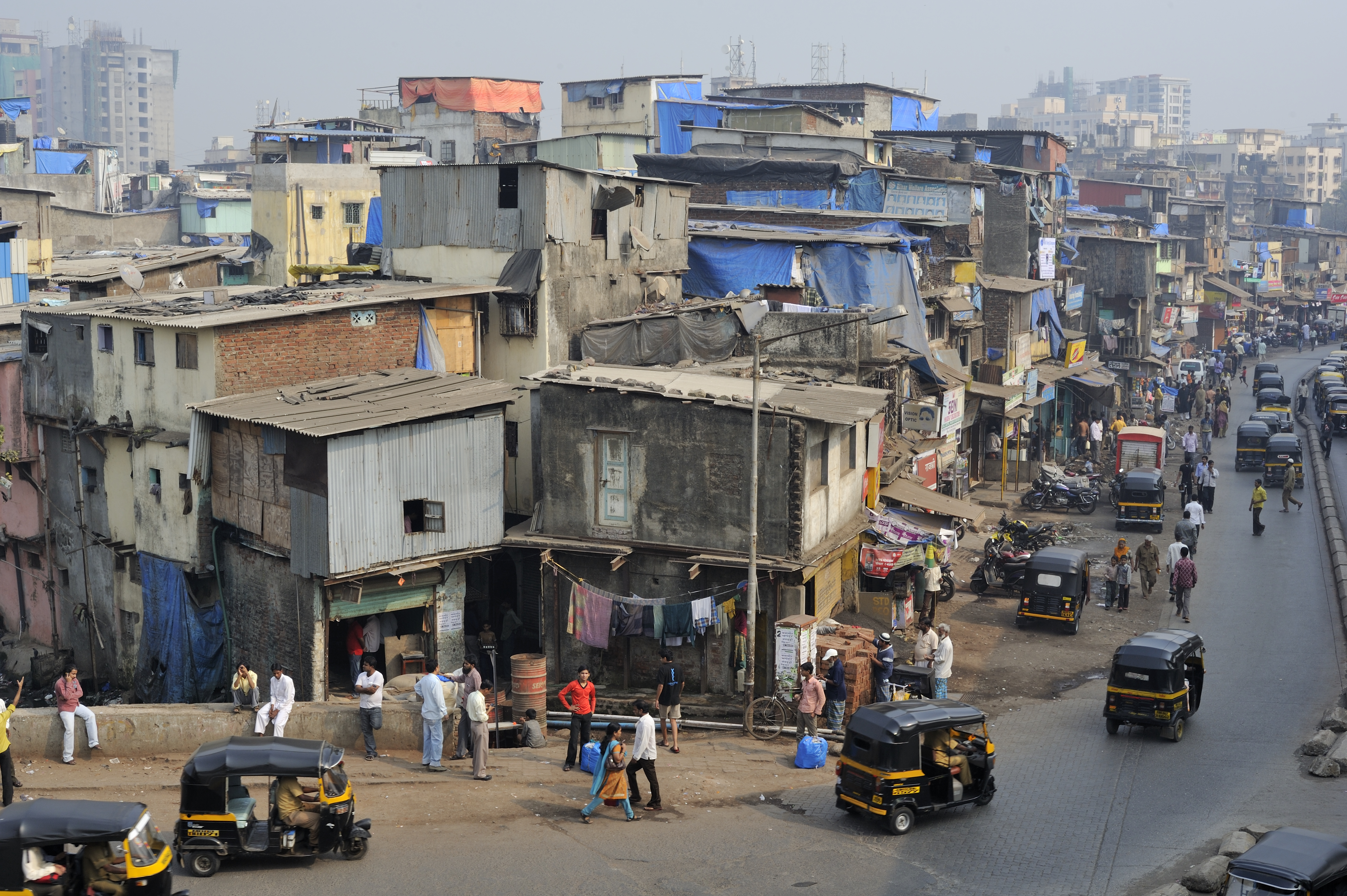
A street in the Dharavi slum in Mumbai

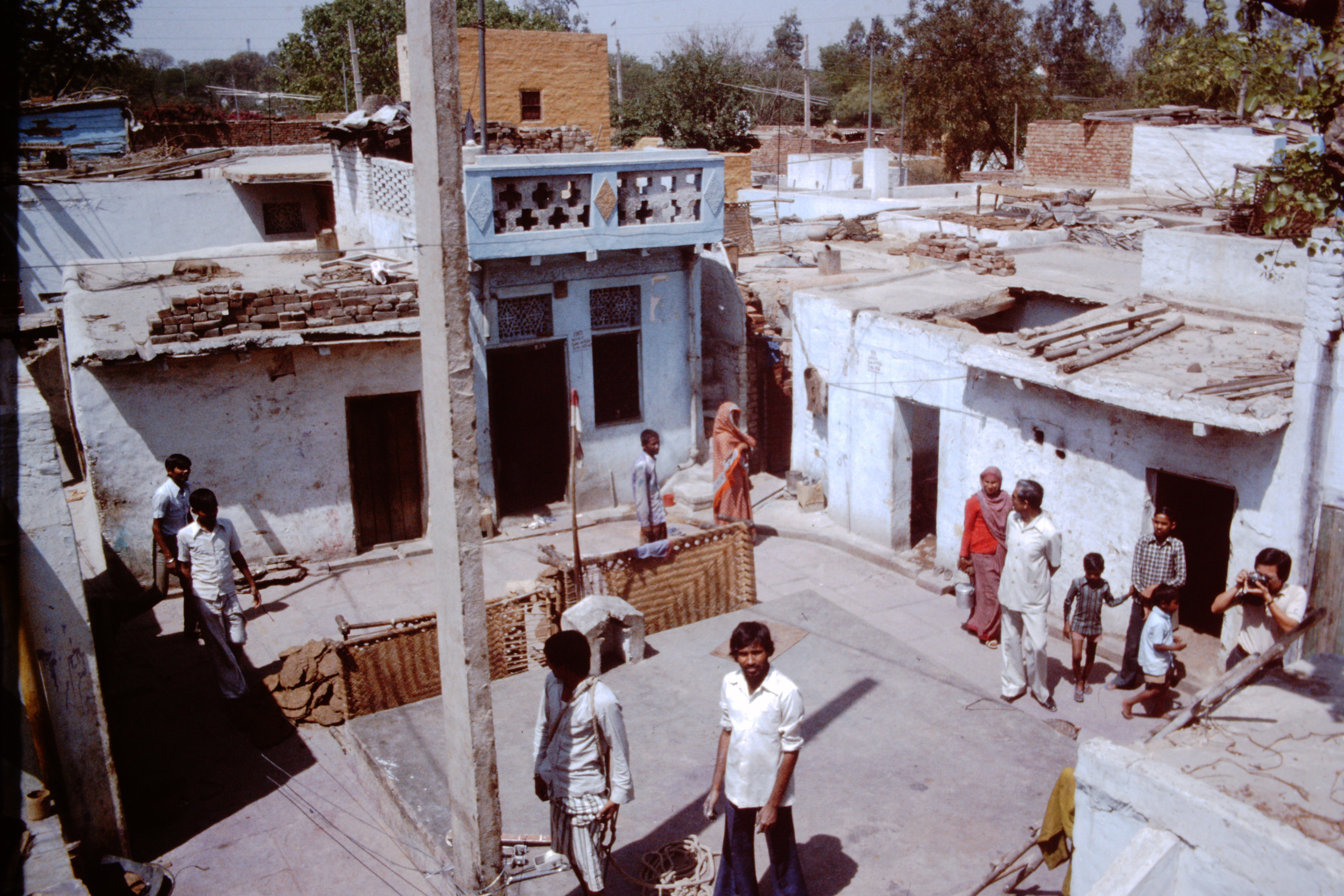
Slum improvement in Delhi, 1983

- Kirti Nagar, Delhi, Delhi
- Mota Varaccha Surat, Gujrat
- Munirka, Delhi, Delhi
- Kathputhli Colony, Delhi
- Talkatora, Delhi
- Pilkhana, Kolkata
- Tikiapara, Kolkata
- Basanti, Kolkata
- Chandmari, Guwahati
- Varracha, Surat, Gujrat
- Dharavi, Mumbai
- Banganga, Mumbai
- Baiganwadi, Mumbai
- Antop Hill, Mumbai
- Vyasarpadi, Chennai
- Royapuram, Chennai
- Thiruvotriyur, Chennai
- Salia Sahi, Bhubaneswar

=== Indonesia ===
A slum in Jakarta, Indonesia

- Kampung Dao and Kampung Muka, near Jakarta Kota railway station
- Kampung Kalibaru, a 1.6 km^{2} slum near New Priok Container consisting of substandard housing with bad sanitation and waste management, junk warehouse, metal scrapping field, and fishing boat manufacturer which directly faces Jakarta Bay
- Kampung Tanah Merah Plumpang, where the 2023 Plumpang oil depot fire occurred, killing 33 people
- Kampung Muara Baru, along East towards North side of Pluit Reservoir
- Kampung Kalimati, West side of Karet Bivak Cemetery
- Jalan Bhakti and Jalan Remaja towards Jl. Bukit Duri Utara, officially owned by Kereta Api Indonesia but squatted since the early 1970s
- Tanah Rendah, Kebon Pala, Bukit Duri and surrounding area in Matraman and Manggarai along Ciliwung River
- Kampung Bahari, Kampung Kebon Pisang towards Tanjung Priuk railway station
- Gang Royal, a suspected illegal prostitution area near Harbour Toll Road
- Rawa Malang, a suspected illegal prostitution area near Budi Dharma Cemetery along Cakung River Drainage
- Slums near railway stations and rail lines (particularly in Jakarta, Semarang and Surabaya)

=== Iran ===
As of 2022-23 twenty to twenty five million Iranians lived in slums.

- District 14, Isfahan - Hasseh, Dark, Zeynabie
- District 15, Tehran

=== Japan ===
- Kamagasaki

=== Pakistan ===
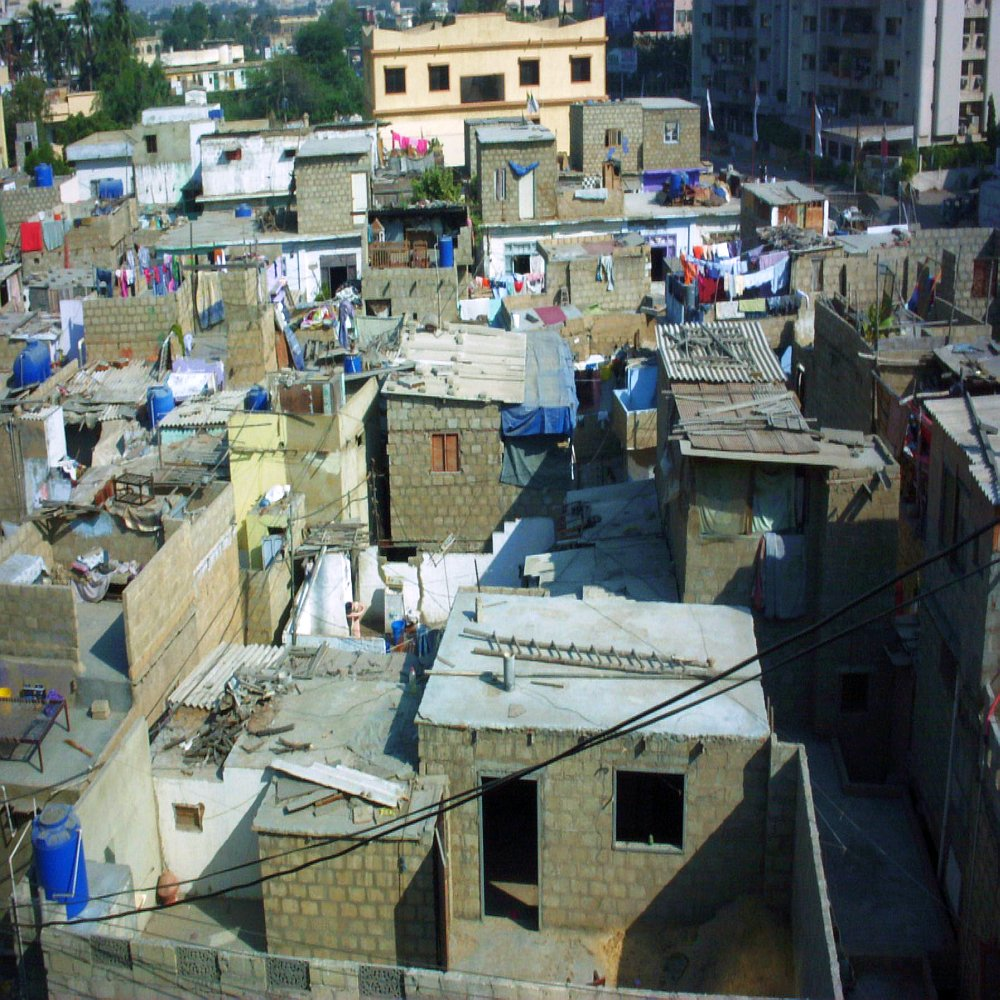
A slum in Karachi, Pakistan

- Parts of Machar Colony

==== Previous Slums in Pakistan ====
- Orangi, previously but status changed to municipality from 2018 onward.

=== Philippines ===
- Tondo, the biggest slum in the Philippines with over 600,000 people according to the 2020 census.
- BASECO compound, near the port of Manila.

=== South Korea ===
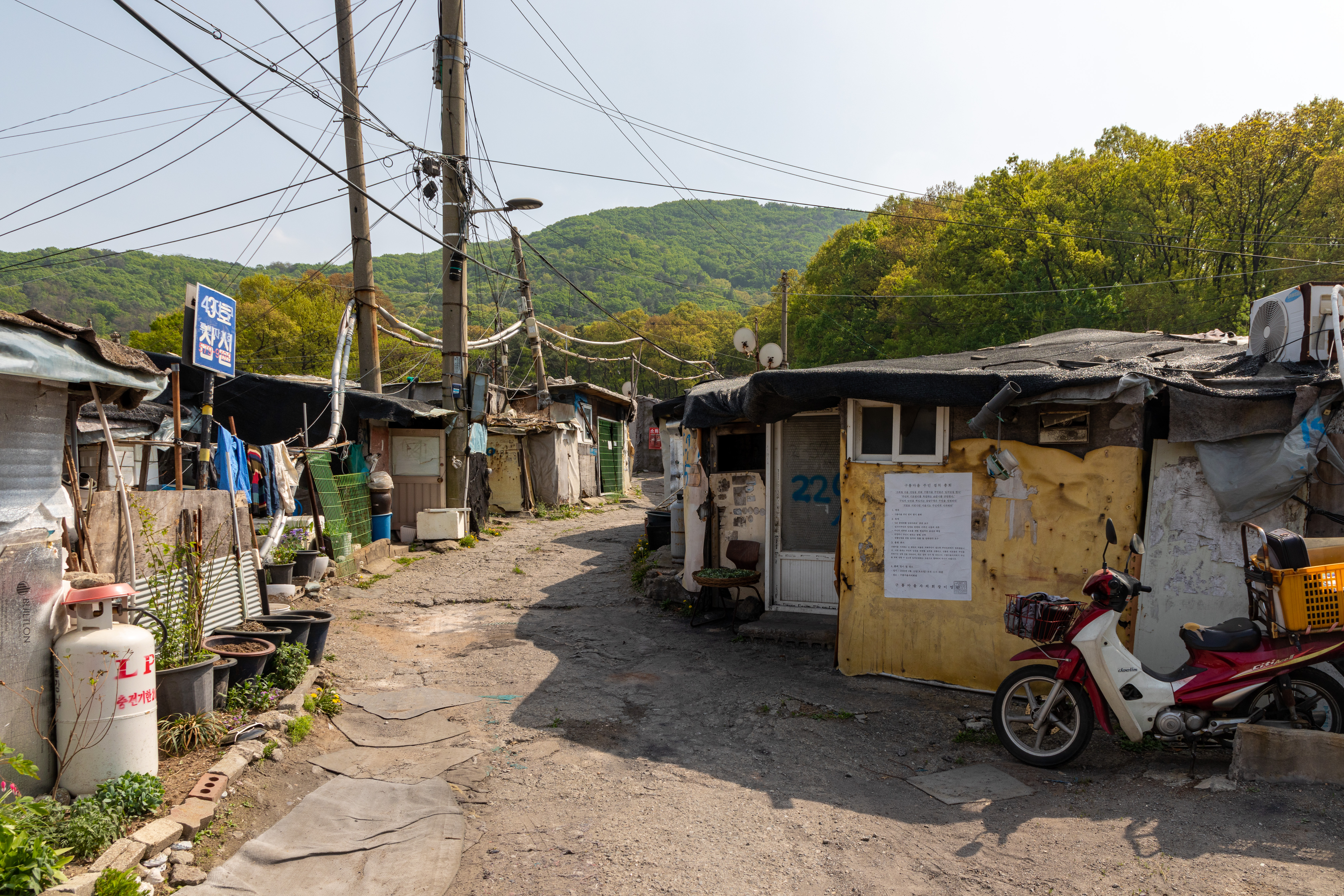
An alley in Guryong Village, Seoul, South Korea

- Guryong Village

=== Sri Lanka ===
- Usavi Watta (Usaui Walta)
- Wanathamulla

=== Thailand ===
- Khlong Toei

=== Turkey ===
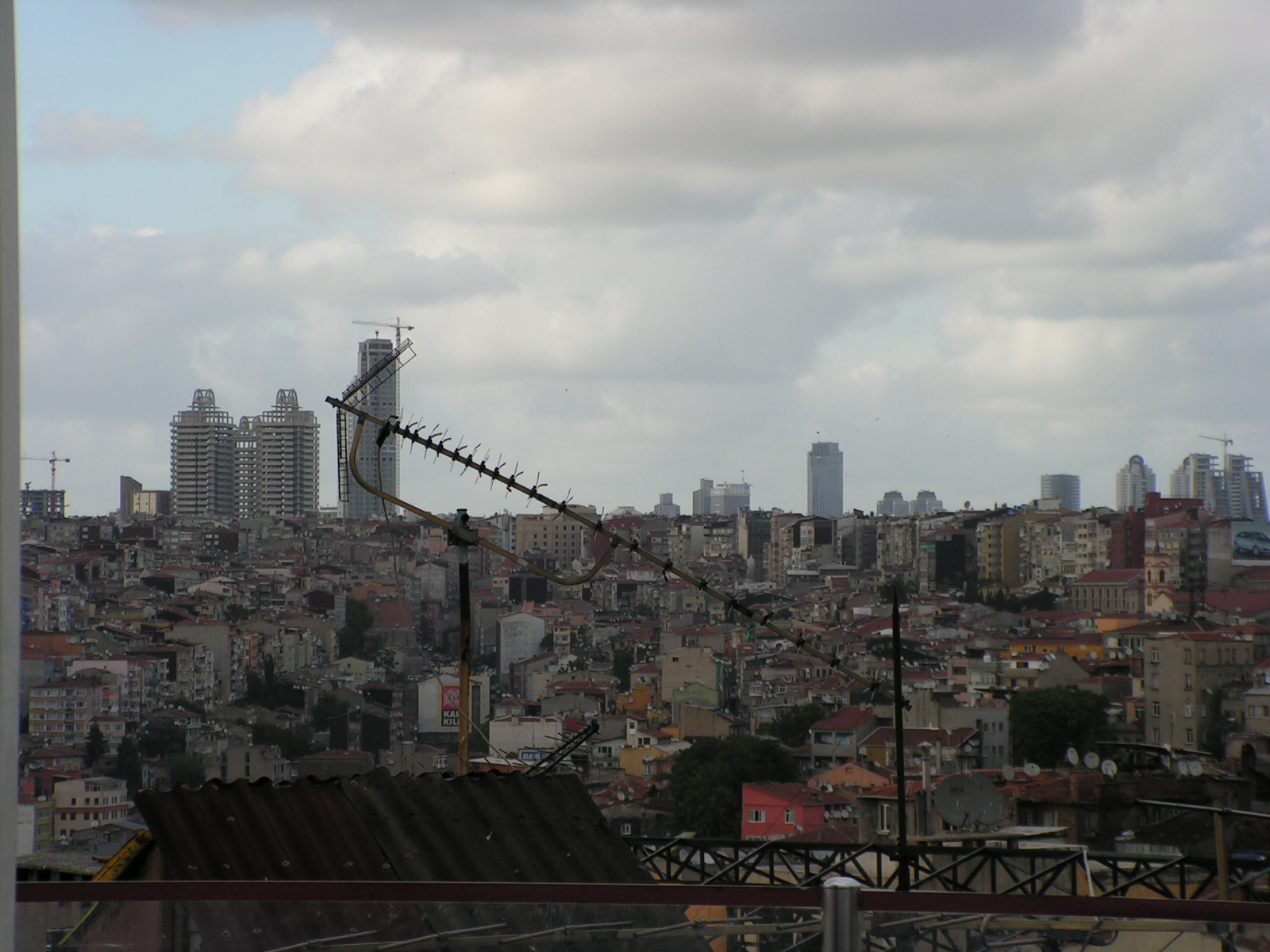
A Gecekondu in Istanbul

- Sultanbeyli, Istanbul
- Çinçin, one of the most popular gecekondu (slum) located in Ankara
- Hacıhüsrev, largest slum of İstanbul
- Hürriyet mahallesi, Adana
- Kadifekale, İzmir
- Horozköy, Manisa

=== Yemen ===
- Mahwa Aser

== Oceania ==
=== Australia ===
- Little Lon district – In the nineteenth century the area consisted of timber and brick cottages, shops and small factories and was home to an ethnically diverse and generally poor population. Today there are few reminders of the area's former notoriety.

== Europe ==
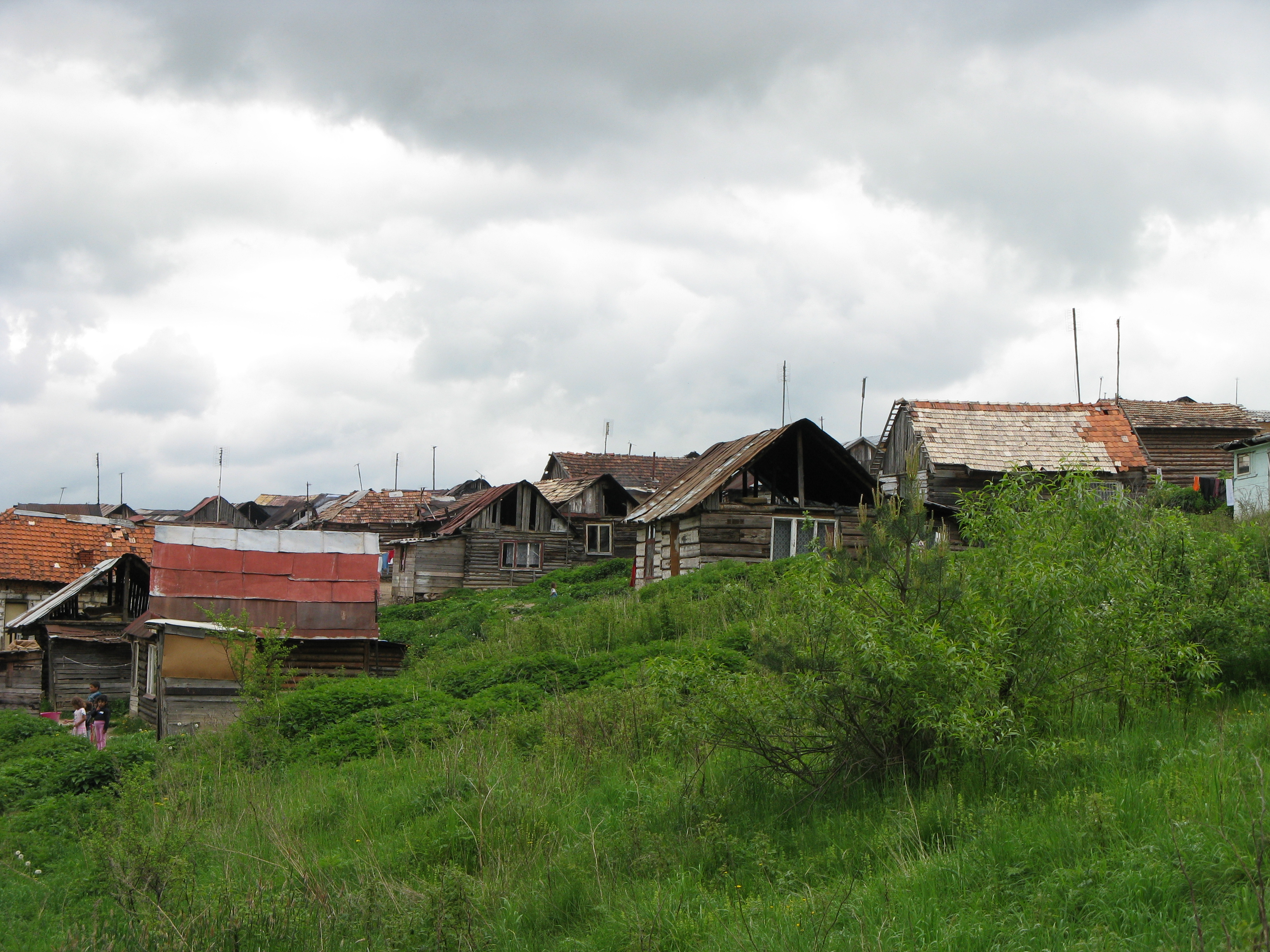
A Romani settlement near Letanovce, Košice Region, Slovakia

=== Bulgaria ===
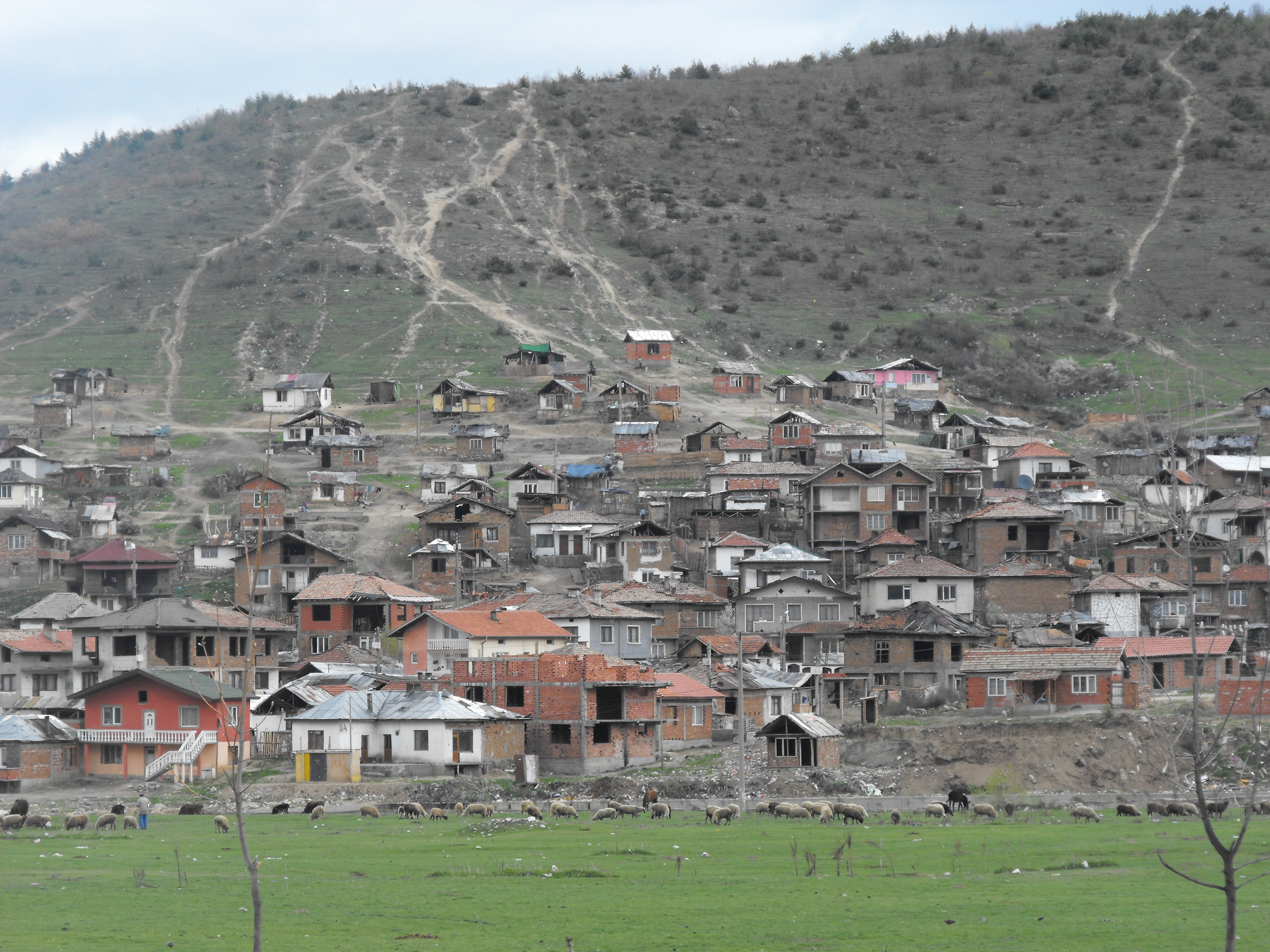
A Romani neighbourhood in Velingrad, Bulgaria

- Fakulteta, Sofia
- Filipovtsi, Sofia
- Hristo Botev, Sofia
- Stolipinovo, Plovdiv
- Sheker Mahala, Plovdiv
- Hadji Hassan Mahala, Plovdiv
- Arman Mahala, Plovdiv
- Maksuda, Varna

=== Greece ===
- Agia Kyriaki, Acharnes, Attica
- Nea zoi, Aspropyrgos, Attica

=== Malta ===
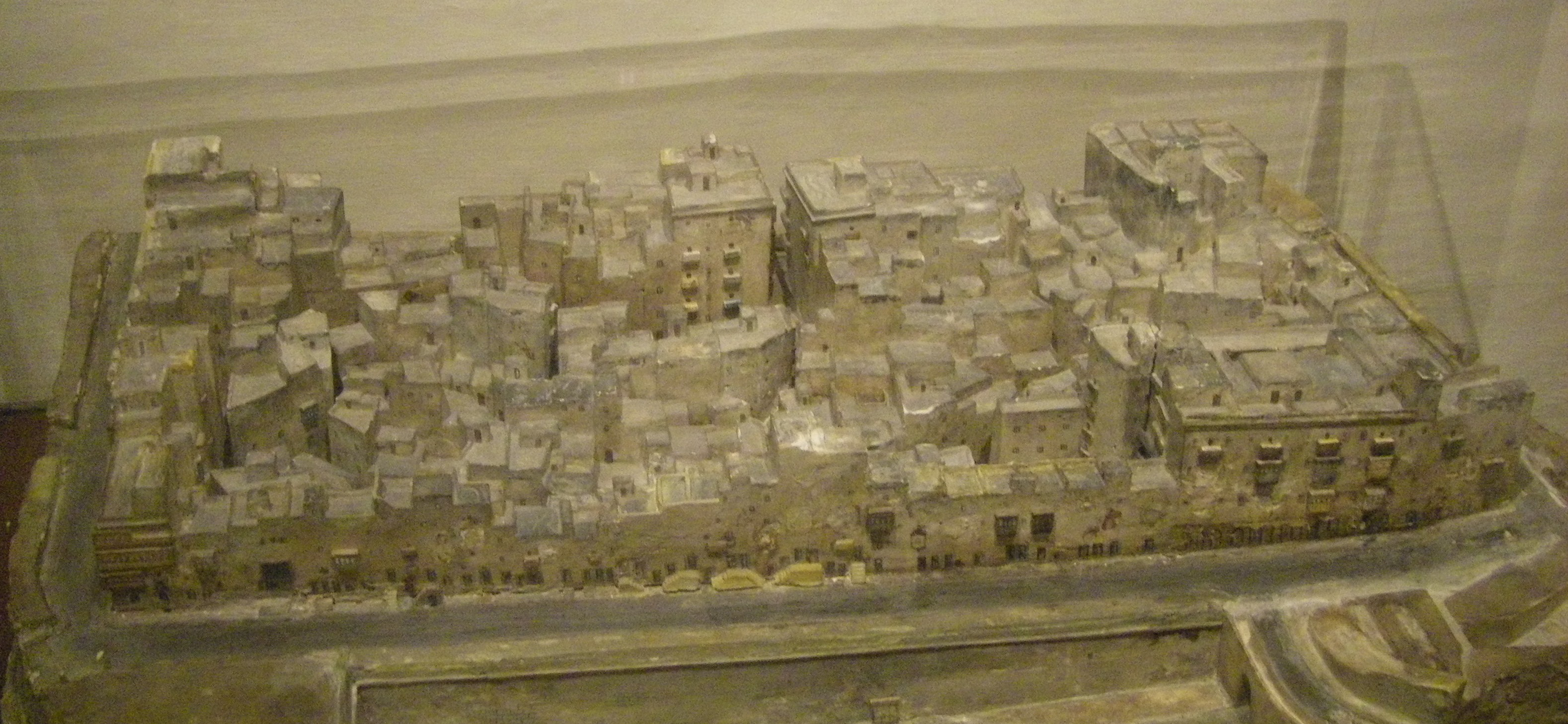
Model of Valletta's Manderaggio before demolition

- The Manderaggio, an area in Valletta that was a slum area from the 16th to the 20th centuries. It was demolished in the 1950s and replaced by housing estates.

=== Portugal ===
- Cova da Moura, Amadora, Lisbon
- Fontainhas, Amadora, Lisbon
- Venda Nova, Amadora, Lisbon
- Barruncho, Lisbon
- Bairro da Jamaica, Amora, Seixal

=== Serbia ===
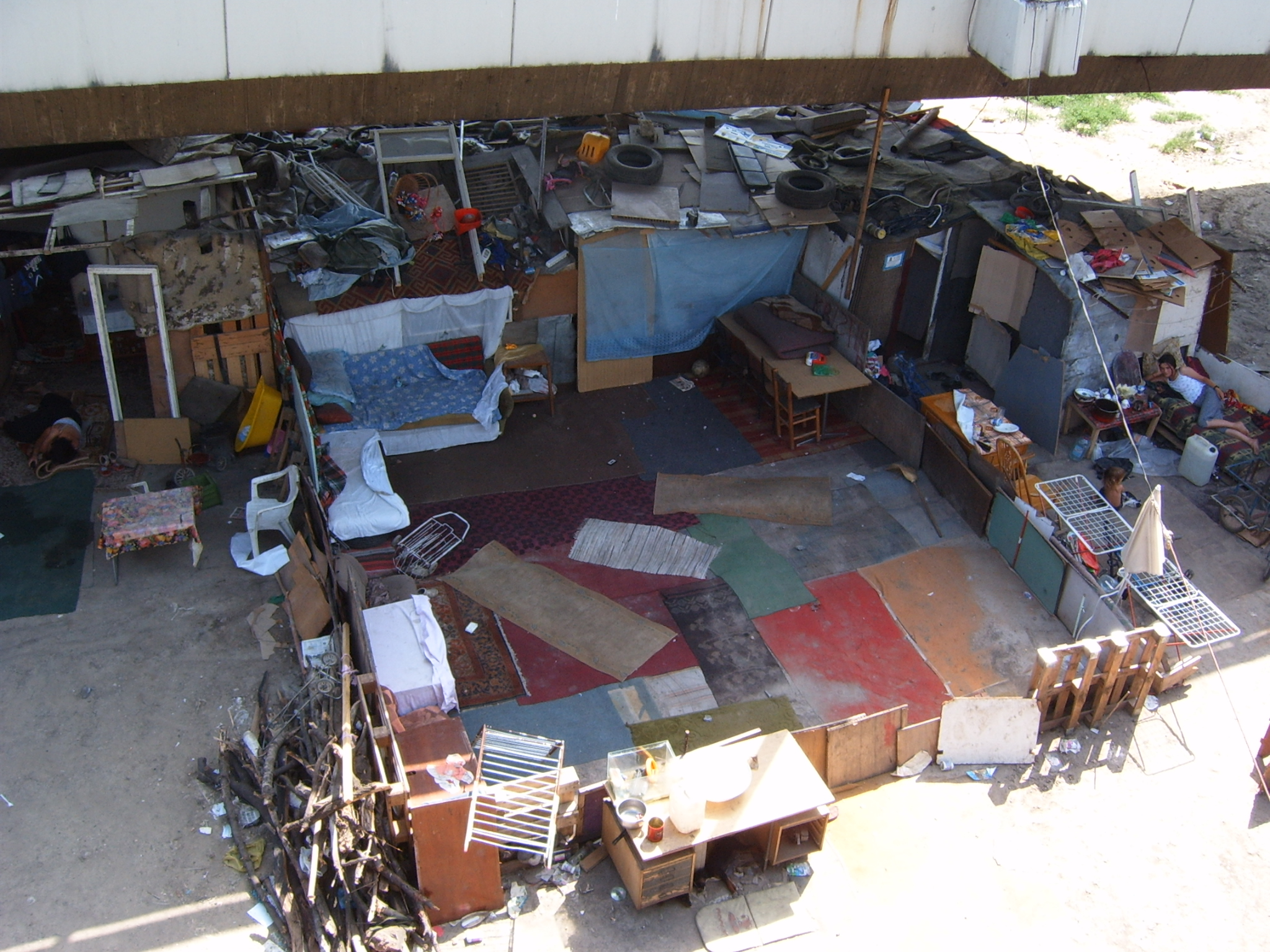
A living area at the former Cardboard city

- Cardboard city (Serbian: Картон сити, romanized: Karton siti) in Belgrade, depopulated and demolished starting on 31 August 2009, following four years of unsuccessful attempts.

=== Spain ===
- Cañada Real, Madrid
  - Las Barranquillas (formerly) Madrid. Dismantled between 2007 and 2011, now a formal town called Valdecarros.
  - Valdemíngomez, Madrid

== North America ==
Cité Soleil, 2002

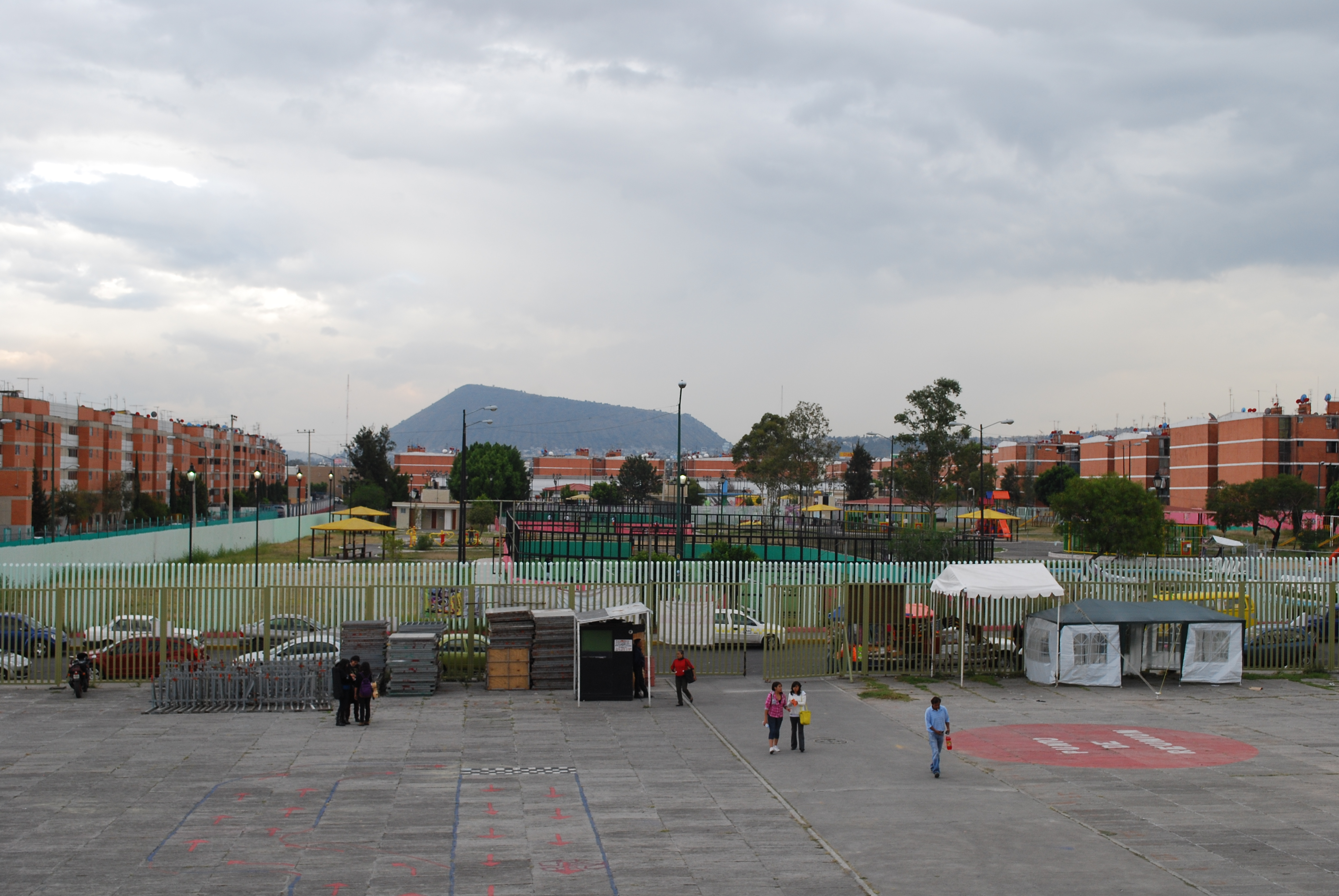
Housing development at Iztapalapa

=== Bahamas ===
- Over the Hill, an area south of Nassau, is the largest and most populous slum of the Bahamas with about 2.5 km^{2}

=== Guatemala ===
- La Limonada in Guatemala City is one of the largest slums in Latin America outside of Brazil, with over 60,000 people in it
- Ciudad Peronia in Villa Nueva
- El Mezquital in Villa Nueva, with 23,000 inhabitants. It started as an emergency housing project after the 1976 Guatemala earthquake

=== Haiti ===
- Cité Soleil in Port-au-Prince

=== Jamaica ===
- Trenchtown
- Mountain Bay
- Vikia

=== Mexico ===
- Neza-Chalco-Ixta in Mexico City, is a Ciudad Perdida, rated as the world's largest mega-slum in 2006. The area extends towards the municipalities of Chimalhuacan, Los Reyes to the west of Ixtapaluca and South of Neza and Ecatepec de Morelos north of Neza in the metropolitan area periphery and with Santa Marta Acatitla in the Distrito Federal's borough of Iztapalapa.

=== Puerto Rico ===
- La Perla, San Juan

== South America ==
=== Argentina ===
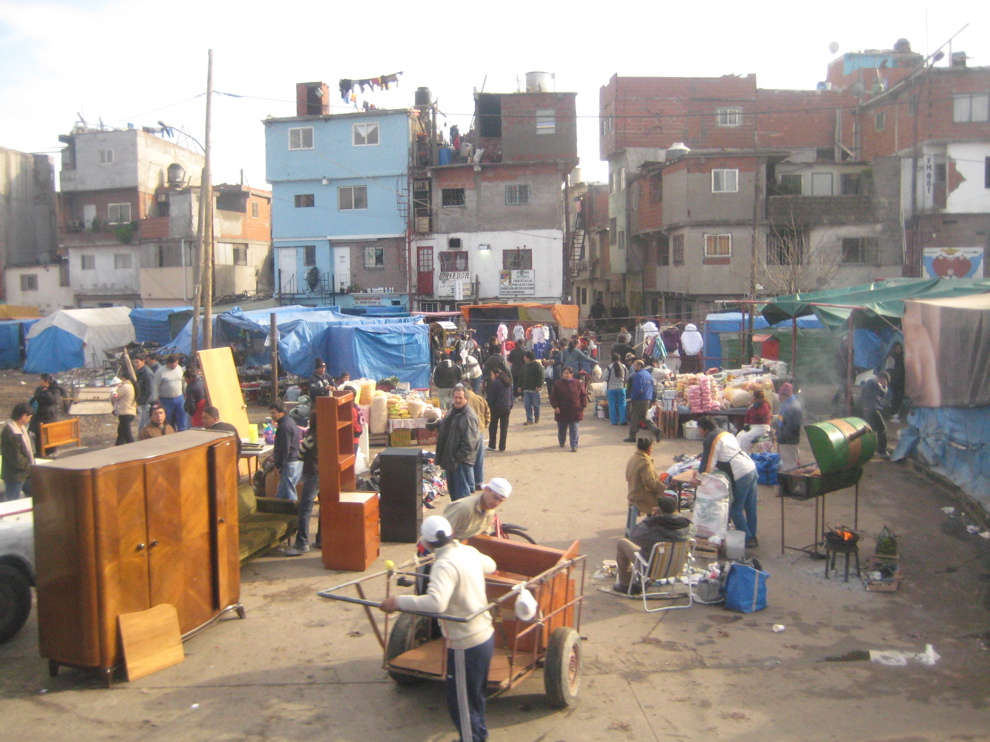
Villa 31 in Buenos Aires

In Buenos Aires:

- Villa 21-24
- Villa 26
- Villa 31
- Villa 1-11-14
- Villa Zabaleta
- Villa Rodrigo Bueno

In Corrientes Capital

- Barrio Esperanza

=== Brazil ===
Shanty towns in Brazil are referred to as favelas.

- Vila Parisi, Cubatão

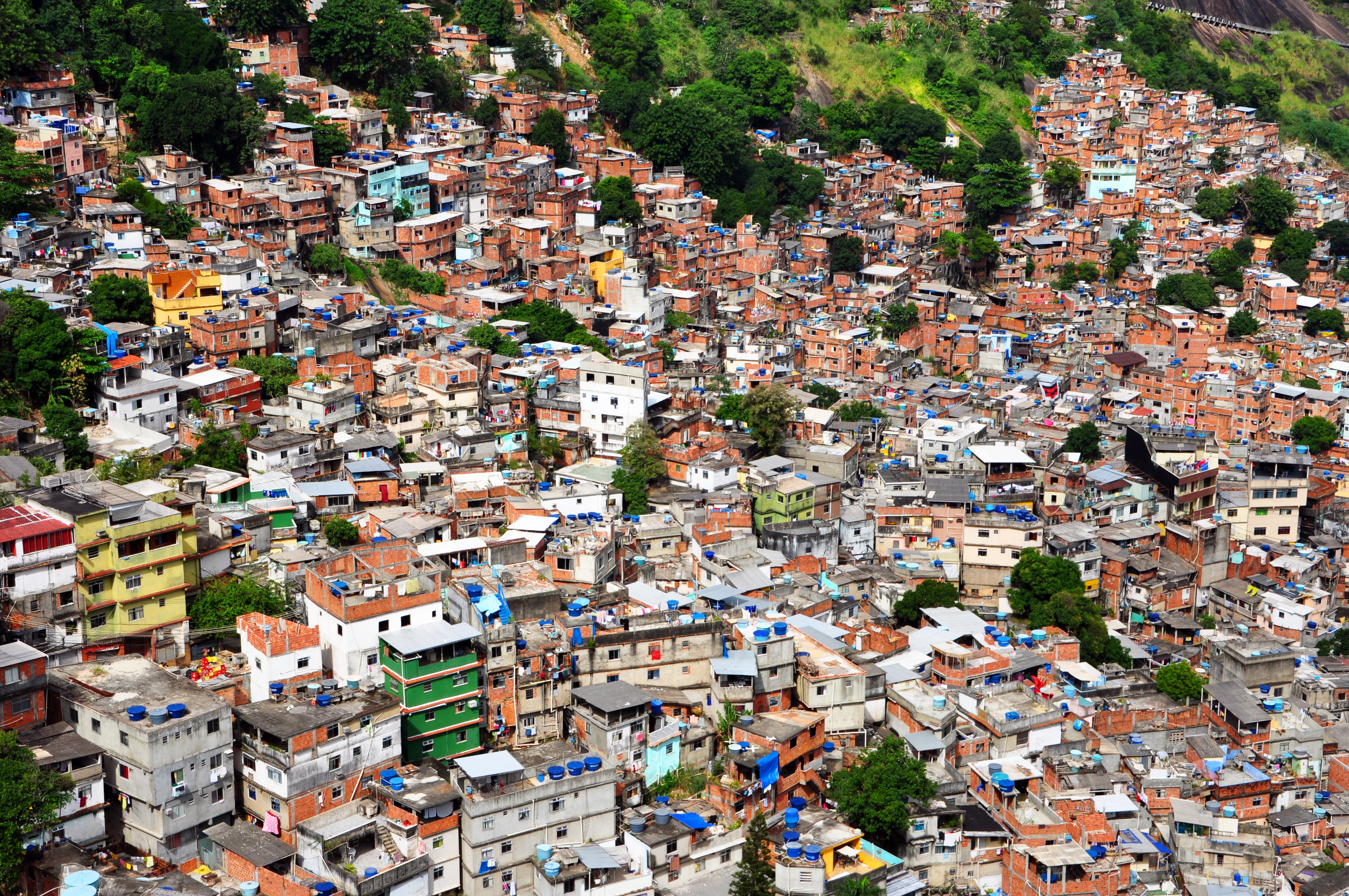
Rocinha is the largest hill favela in Rio de Janeiro. Although favelas are found in urban areas throughout Brazil, many of the more famous ones exist in Rio — a widely photographed city

- Cidade de Deus, Rio de Janeiro
- Complexo do Alemão, Rio de Janeiro
- Santa Marta, Rio de Janeiro
- Jacarezinho, Rio de Janeiro
- Mangueira, Rio de Janeiro
- Manguinhos, Rio de Jainero
- Morro da Babilônia, Rio de Jainero
- Rocinha, Rio de Janeiro
- Vidigal, Rio de Janeiro
- Vigário Geral, Rio de Janeiro
- Ilha das Cobras, Rio de Janeiro
- Heliópolis, São Paulo
- Paraisópolis, São Paulo

=== Colombia ===
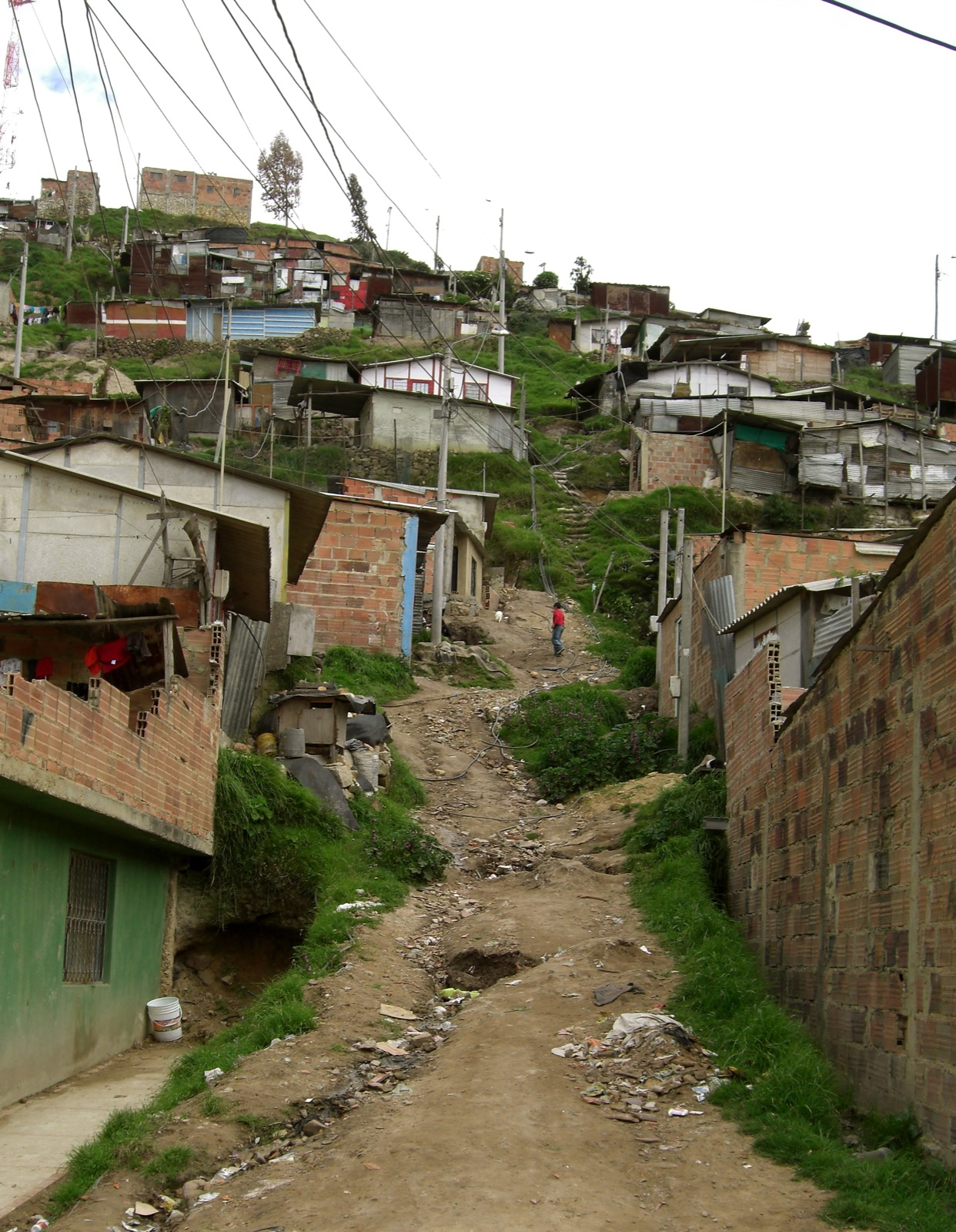
Ciudad Bolívar (Bogotá)

- Ciudad Bolívar (Bogotá)
- Siloé (Cali)

=== Paraguay ===
- Bañados del Río Paraguay

=== Peru ===
Pueblos jóvenes is the nickname given to the vast shanty towns that surround Lima and other cities of Peru. Many of these towns have developed into significant districts in Lima such as Villa El Salvador and Comas.

- Comas
- Villa El Salvador
- San Juan de Lurigancho
- Cono Sur

=== Uruguay ===
- Presidente Kennedy, Punta del Este

=== Venezuela ===
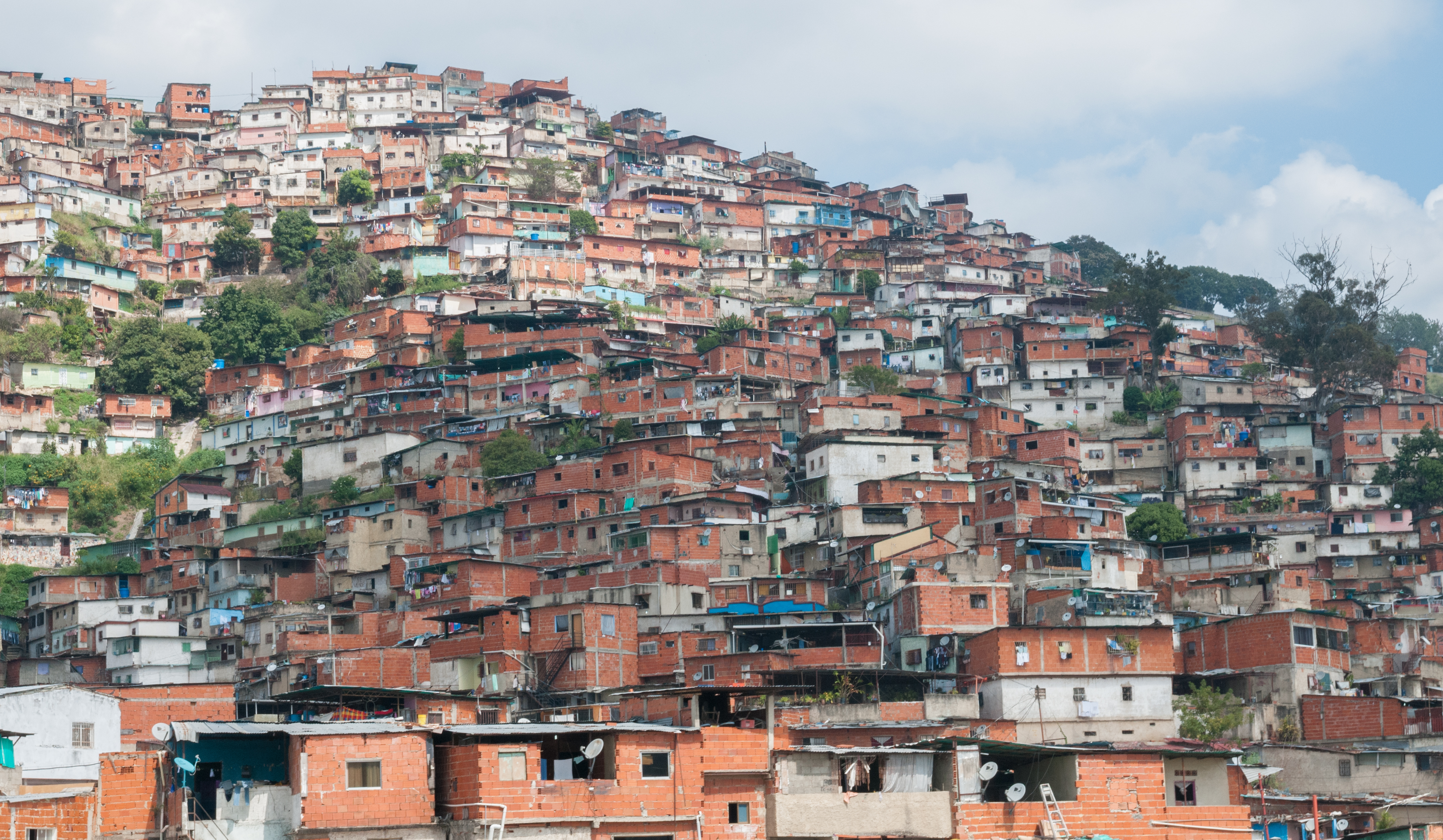
Petare slum in Caracas

- Miguel Peña Parish
- Libertador Bolivarian Municipality in Caracas

== See also ==
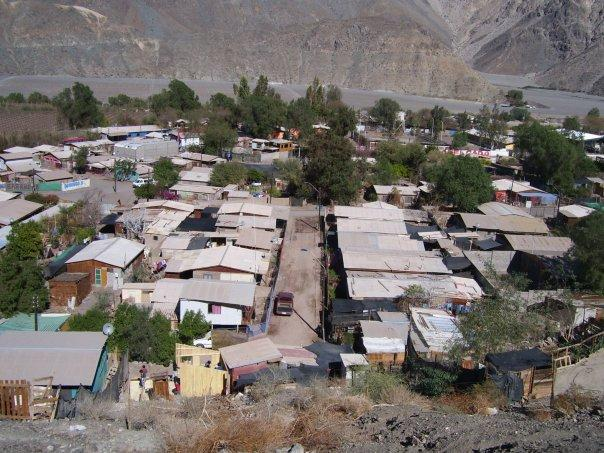
A campamento in Chile

- Campamento (Chile) – a term in Chile to shanty towns.
- Chengzhongcun – less prosperous areas of urban areas in China.
- Cortiço – a Portuguese term commonly used in Brazil and Portugal to describe an area of urban housing where many people live in conditions of poor hygiene and poverty.
- Rugby boy – a common group or gang of street children seen in the Philippines, they are one of the most well known and recognized poverty inflicted people found in the slums of the Philippines.
- Slum upgrading – consists of physical, social, economic, organizational and environmental improvements to slums undertaken cooperatively and locally among citizens, community groups, businesses and local authorities.
- Villa miseria – a type of shanty town or slum found in Argentina
