= List of slums in Bangladesh =

This is a list of slums in Bangladesh.

- Badda (Dhaka)
- Balurmat Colony (Dhaka)
- Bank Field (Gazipur)
- Begun Bari
- Bhadra Lake (Rajshahi)
- Bhola (Dhaka North)
- Bongobondhu Colony (Barisal)
- Bou Bazar (Dhaka)
- City Palli (Dhaka South)
- Coloni Bosti (Dhaka)
- Dayrapak (Rajshahi)
- Diyabari (Dhaka)
- Driver Colony (Dhaka South)
- Duaripara (Dhaka North)
- Hazaribagh (Dhaka)
- Hazi Mazar (Gazipur)
- Hotath Bosti (Rangpur)
- Joragate (Khulna)
- Kalabagan (Gazipur)
- Kalunogor Bos (Dhaka)
- Kawnia Colony (Dhaka)
- Khojar Khola (Sylhet)
- Komlapur Bosti (Dhaka)
- Korail slum (Dhaka North)
- Mach Colony (Dhaka South)
- Mannan (Dhaka South)
- Matir Colony Porshchim Par (Sylhet)
- Matir Colony Purbo Par (Sylhet)
- Mirpur-6 (Dhaka)
- Mohakhali (Dhaka)
- Molla (Dhaka North)
- Monsur Beel / Nama Para (Dhaka South)
- Ninala (Khulna)
- Nishad Nagar (Gazipur)
- Notun Bazar (Khulna)
- Nubur (Dhaka South)
- Padma Para (Rajshahi)
- Palashpur (Barisal)
- Power House (Dhaka South)
- Pura (Dhaka South)
- Rail Line slums (Dhaka South)
- Railway Colony (Rajshahi)
- Railway Colony (Rangpur)
- Rishipara (Dhaka)
- Tejgaon Bosti (Dhaka)
- Tirish Godown (Barisal)
- Uttar Noorpur (Rangpur)

== See also ==
- List of slums
