= List of slums in India =

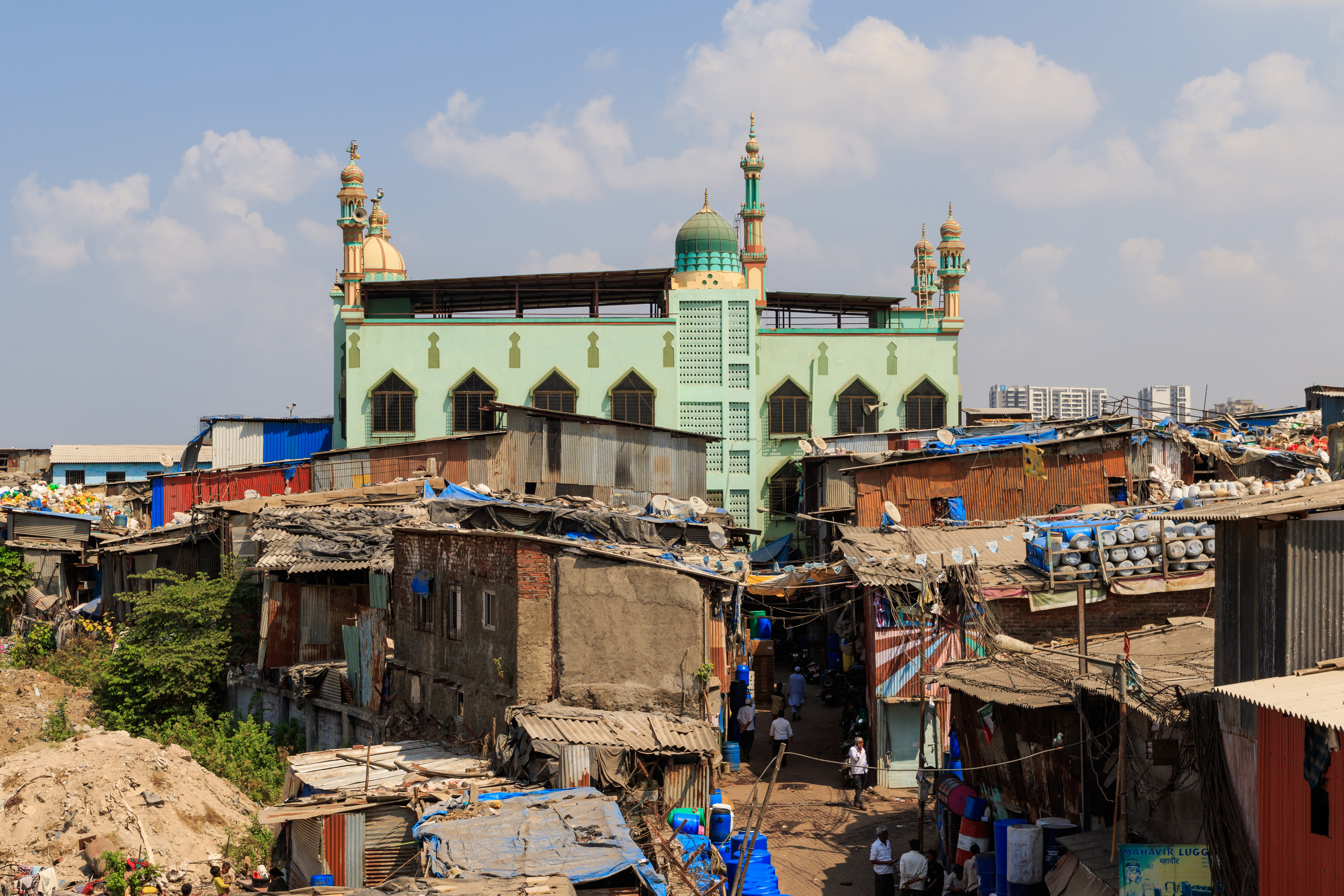
Dharavi

This is a list of slums in India.

== List ==
=== Delhi ===
- Munirka, Delhi
- Talkatora

=== Near Kolkata ===
- Pilkhana
- Tikiapara
- Basanti

=== Mumbai ===
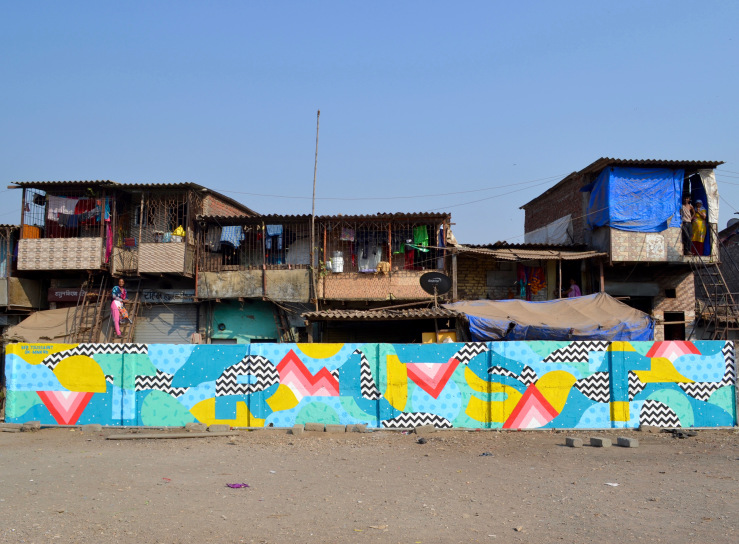
Mural by artist Seb Toussaint in a slum in Mumbai

- Dharavi
- Banganga
- Baiganwadi
- Antop Hill

=== Bhubaneswar ===
- Salia Sahi

=== Others ===
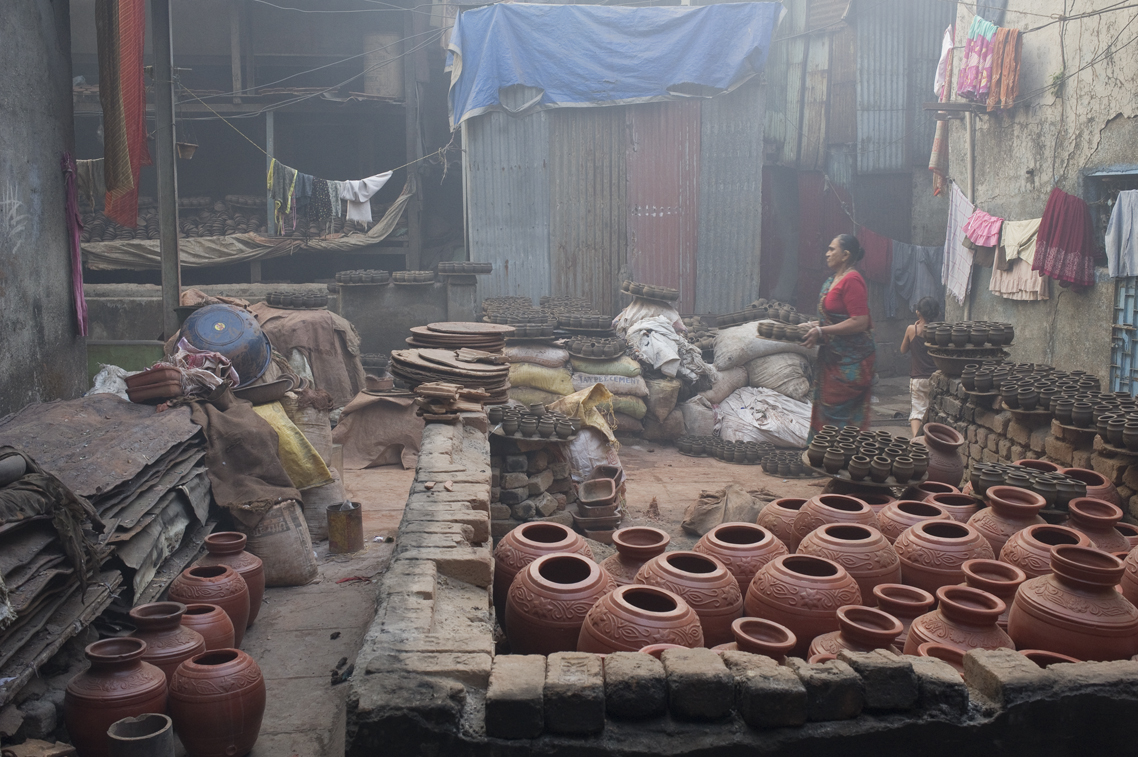
An integrated slum dwelling and informal economy inside Dharavi of Mumbai. Dharavi slum started in 1887 with industrial and segregationist policies of the British colonial era. The slum housing, tanneries, pottery and other economy established inside and around Dharavi during the British rule of India.

- Prem Sagar

== See also ==
- Mahila Milan
- Slum Jagathu
- Poverty in India

Housing

- Housing in India
- Illegal housing in India
- Pavement dwellers
- Street children in India

International:

- List of slums
