= Parisi =

Parisi may refer to:

- Parisi (musicians), Italian music production and songwriting duo
- Parisi (surname), an Italian surname
- Parisi (Yorkshire), an ancient tribe
- Parisi, São Paulo, a Brazilian municipality
- Parisi Industries, Inc., a toy factory in Brooklyn, New York
- Patsy Parisi, a fictional character from The Sopranos
- Parisi v. Davidson, a United States Supreme Court case
- Vila Parisi, a "favela" (slum) in Cubatão, Brazil
- Villa Parisi, a villa in Monte Porzio Catone municipal territory, Italy
- Johnny Swinger (born 1975), professional wrestler who performed under the name "Johnny Parisi"

== See also ==
- Kardar–Parisi–Zhang equation
- Parisii (disambiguation)
