= List of slums in Eswatini =

This is a list of slums in Eswatini, formerly Swaziland. As of 2000, the country had a population of 1 million and 60% of people living in cities were housed in informal settlements with poor infrastructure.

- Madonsa in Manzini.
- Mhobodleni.
- Moneni in Manzini.
- Masunduza or Msunduza in Mbabane.
- Nkawlini in Mbabane.

== See also ==
- List of slums
