= 2025 Dhaka slum fire =

Fire in Korail slum in Dhaka, Bangladesh in 2025

The 2025 Dhaka slum fire was a major fire that broke out in the Korail slum of Dhaka, Bangladesh, on 25 November 2025. Approximately 1,500 homes were destroyed or damaged, leaving thousands of residents homeless. No casualties were reported.

== Background ==
Korail is one of the largest and most densely populated informal settlements in Dhaka. Located between the Gulshan and Banani neighbourhoods, the settlement is home to approximately 80,000 residents living in closely packed housing structures.

== Fire ==
The fire broke out shortly after sunset on 25 November 2025 and spread rapidly through the densely populated settlement. At least 19 firefighting units were deployed to control the blaze. Firefighters faced difficulties due to heavy traffic congestion and narrow access roads within the slum. Reuters reported that the fire was brought under control after more than five hours, while the Associated Press reported that it took approximately 16 hours to fully extinguish the blaze.

== Aftermath ==
Thousands of residents were displaced as a result of the fire and were forced to seek temporary shelter. On the following day, residents were seen searching through the debris for salvageable belongings. Authorities stated that the cause of the fire was not immediately known.
