= Mahwa Aser =

Mahwa 'Aser محوى عصر
- Slum, Informal settlement
- Interactive map of Mahwa 'Aser
- Mahwa Aser in Sanaa
- Coordinates: 15.3747°N 44.2067°E
- Country: Yemen
- Governorate: Sanaa Governorate

Population (2008)
  - Total: 17,000
- Time zone: UTC+3 (Yemen Standard Time)
- ISO 3166 code: YE

Mahwa 'Aser (Arabic: محوى عصر) is a slum community in Sanaa, the capital city of Yemen. Mahwa Aser is home to an estimated 17,000 people, these people live in informal housing without access to sanitation. The poor living conditions in the slum have a serious negative impact on the health of residents. There is no school in Mahwa Aser.

In July 2008, police were deployed in Mahwa Aser to undertake the eviction of residents who had recently moved to the area. There were violent clashes between police and residents. Approximately ten homes were demolished.

== See also ==
- ʽAsr
