= Stolipinovo =

District of Plovdiv, Bulgaria

Stolipinovo Столипиново
- District
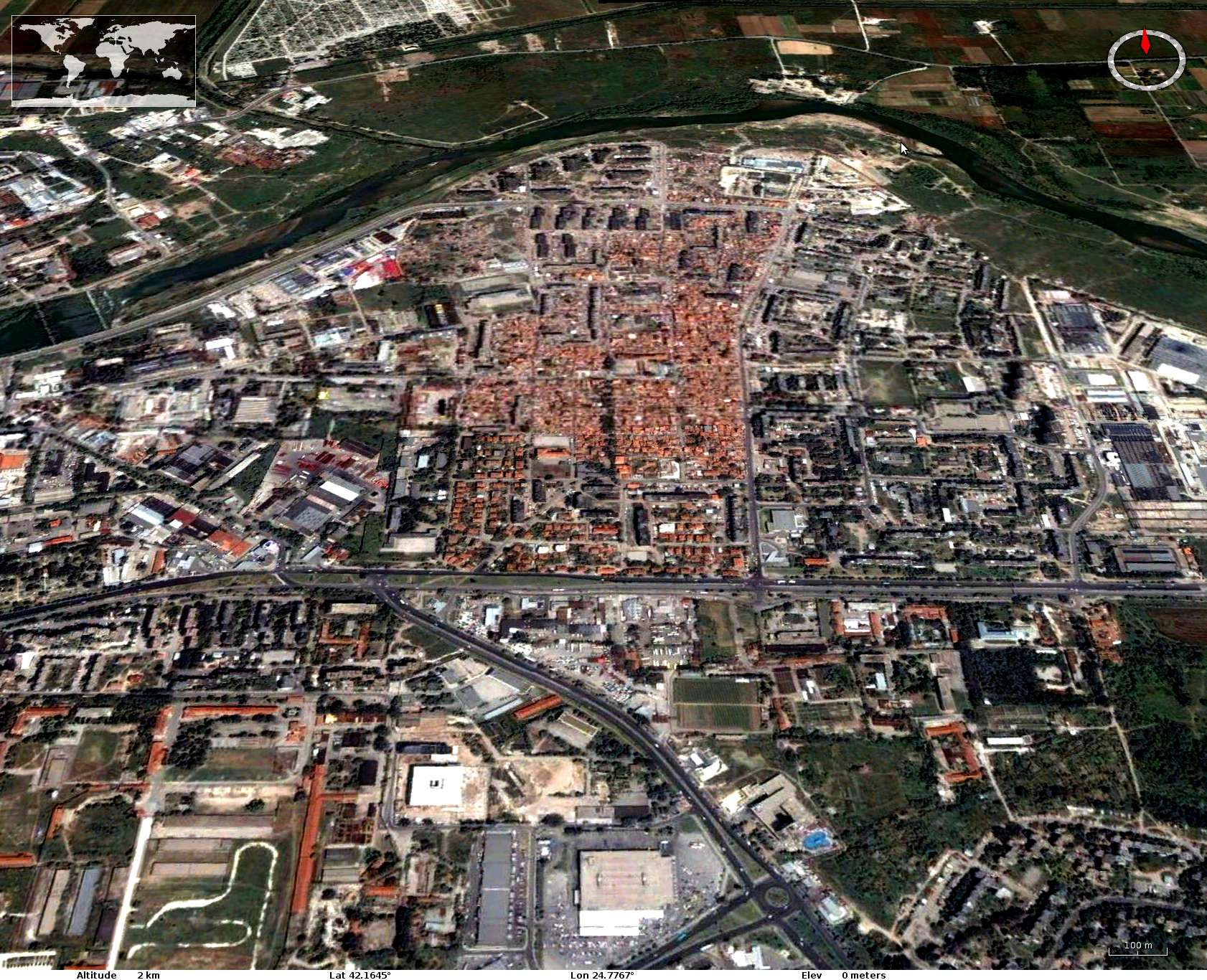
- View northerly of Stolipinovo from NASA WorldWind, 2010

- Location within Bulgaria
- Coordinates: 42°09′15″N 24°47′06″E
- Country: Bulgaria
- Province: Plovdiv Province
- Municipality: Plovdiv
- City: Plovdiv

Population
  - Total: 40,000

Stolipinovo (Bulgarian: Столипиново) is a district of the Bulgarian city of Plovdiv and the most populous predominantly Romani-inhabited district on the Balkans with a population of about 40,000 people. It is a ghetto located on the outskirts of the city, in its northeastern part on the right bank of the Maritsa.

Stolipinovo was one of the sites of the 2019 Plovdiv European Capital of Culture program, in which German artists and architects Martin Kaltwasser and Maik Ronz created a concept for building a sustainable, temporary canopy and seating at the Maritsa river bank adjacent to Stolipinovo in cooperation with volunteers and participants from the local Roma community, encouraging to connect the neighbourhood with the rest of the city.

== Utilities ==
Since the end of the socialist era in 1989 there have been almost no investments in the infrastructure of Stolipinovo. In combination with the boom of illegal housing this led to severe problems with regards to electricity and water supply, sewerage and waste disposal.

Due to accumulated debts for electricity and water surpassing €3 million, in 2002 the (then state-owned) local supplier shut down electricity completely for all inhabitants of Stolipinovo. This kind of "kin liability" has been widely regarded as illegal by human rights organisations and led to a spontaneous riot. After the situation calmed down, the district was supplied electricity for six hours per night. This regime has not yet been abolished, despite a 31 October 2006, ruling by the Plovdiv Regional Court, that the practice of the Austrian EVN monopolist was "discriminatory." Stolipinovo is unique in having electricity distribution boards raised on poles several metres tall.

Sanitation is poor owing to the shortage of safe water, due to burst pipes. Piped water rarely reaches the highest floors of apartment buildings. In most of the illegal buildings there is no water supply at all. The sewers in Stolipinovo are mostly dysfunctional and overflowing, forming puddles in the streets. Illegal buildings are not connected at all. Household waste is typically hurled from windows and balconies of apartments onto heaps on the ground below.

Inevitably, these problems caused a hepatitis A epidemic in the summer of 2006 which affected at least 637 persons in Stolipinovo, and spread to other parts of the city, Sheker Mahala in particular. As a result, RIOKOZ of the Ministry of Health completed a mass immunisation campaign of children in Plovdiv by the end of October 2006. Other emergency measures undertaken by the municipality included dismantlement of illegal kiosks that had lined the streets and disposal of refuse left uncollected for years.

=== Electricity debt ===
The overcoming of this humanitarian and economic problem, which had been neglected for many years, was undertaken by EVN Bulgaria – a subsidiary of the Austrian utility company, which in 2004 acquired the Electricity Distributing Companies in South Eastern Bulgaria and inherited the debts, the regime, the damaged electricity grid, and the problematic relations with the clients. Company’s experts prepared a complete technical project, a programme for public-private partnership and an information campaign, the implementation of which took almost a year. The electricity grid was entirely renovated, including the installation of new on-ground boards, which allows a visual control on the readings of the electricity meters on behalf of the clients.

The project paid attention also to activities for improvement of the supplier-client relations. The old payments were stretched out according to a socially bearable scheme. Within the work on the project a lot of families, who had previously been illegally joined to the grid, were separated as new subscribers in compliance with the legal requirements. On one hand this improved the relations with the clients, and on the other restored their faith in the company. EVN appointed Romani people to consulting positions working in the neighbourhood. Their obligations are to consult the clients upon comprehending the readings of their electricity meters as well as to carry out information campaigns directed to energy efficiency. Company’s cash desks facilitating payments were opened in the neighbourhood.

As a result, since 2007 the Roma community in Stolipinovo has started receiving 24-hour electricity supply. About 3 million Euros have been invested in the entire replacement of 185 kilometers of electricity grid, renovation or construction of a total of 17 transformer stations, opening of 4 cash desks on the territory of the neighbourhood, joining 6 400 subscribers to the grid. Success has been achieved, which few believed in before: the collectability in the neighbourhood has been raised from 3% in 2006 to 85% after the fulfillment of the project, and the technological losses decreased from 40% to 5%. The success in Stolipinovo reassured the management of EVN Bulgaria to apply the programme in other Roma-inhabited neighbourhoods on the territory of South Eastern Bulgaria and to ensure electricity supply according to all present-day standards.

== See also ==
- Roma in Bulgaria
