= Cardboard city =

Informal settlement in Belgrade, Serbia

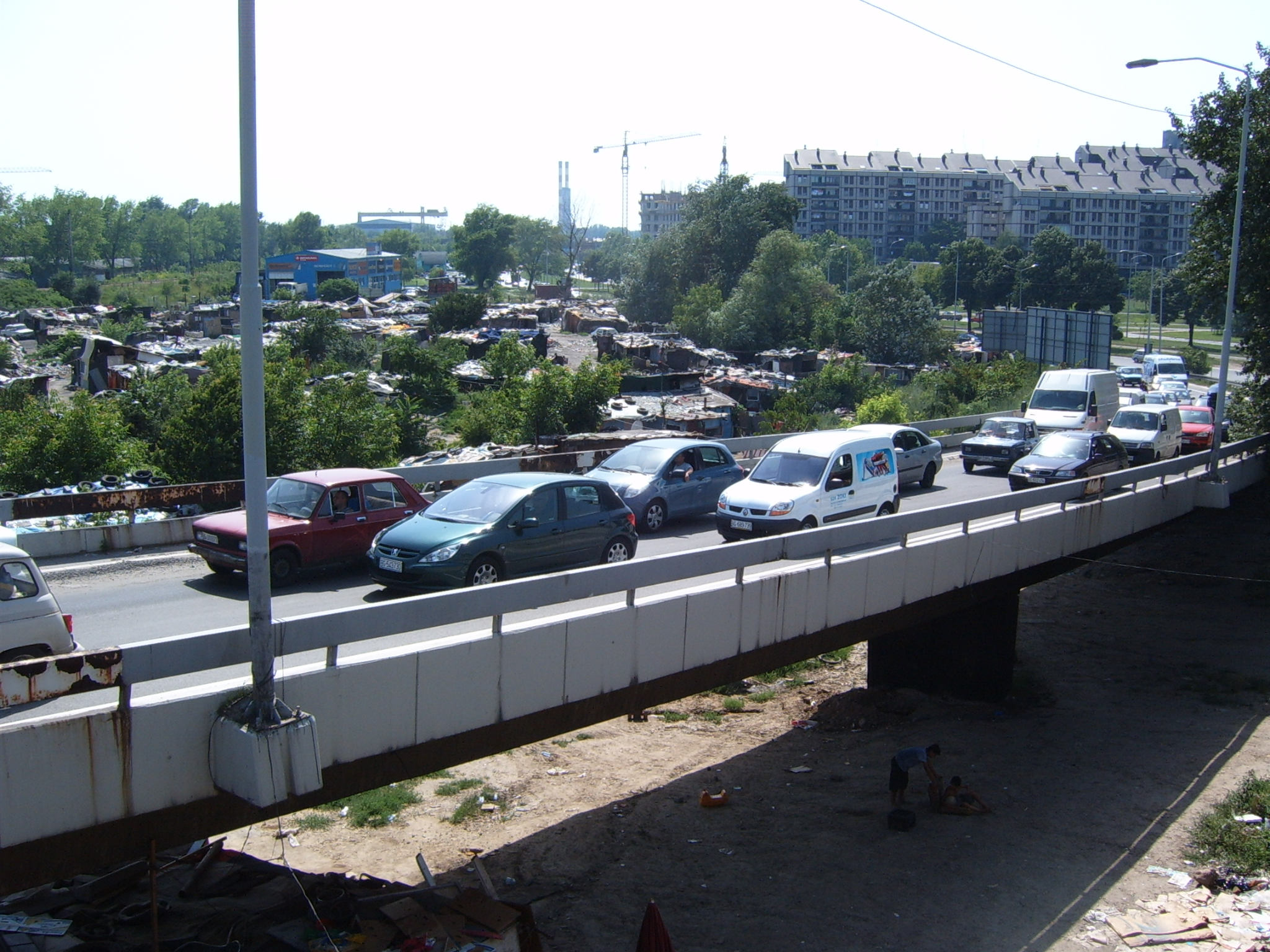
A view of Karton city from Gazela bridge before the eviction

Cardboard city (Serbian: Картон сити, Karton siti) was an informal settlement that was locally classified as unhygienic settlement (or slum) in the capital of Serbia. It was located in Belgrade's municipality of Novi Beograd. The settlement was completely evicted and cleared in 2009.

== Settlement ==
Most of the houses in the Cardboard city were built, as its name suggests, from cardboard or other non-building materials, like plywood or nylon bags. The settlement had no communal infrastructure (roads, running water, sewage, electricity).

The settlement was located beneath the bridges Gazela and Stari železnički. The settlement was just a few kilometers away from the downtown Belgrade, close to the Block 19 and Block 20, and in contrast to five-star hotels Hyatt Regency Belgrade and Continental Hotel Belgrade.

There were 986 people living in the Cardboard city (501 men; 485 women) of whom 278 were children living in 237 "households" according to the census taken by the city authorities in August 2007.

== Depopulation ==
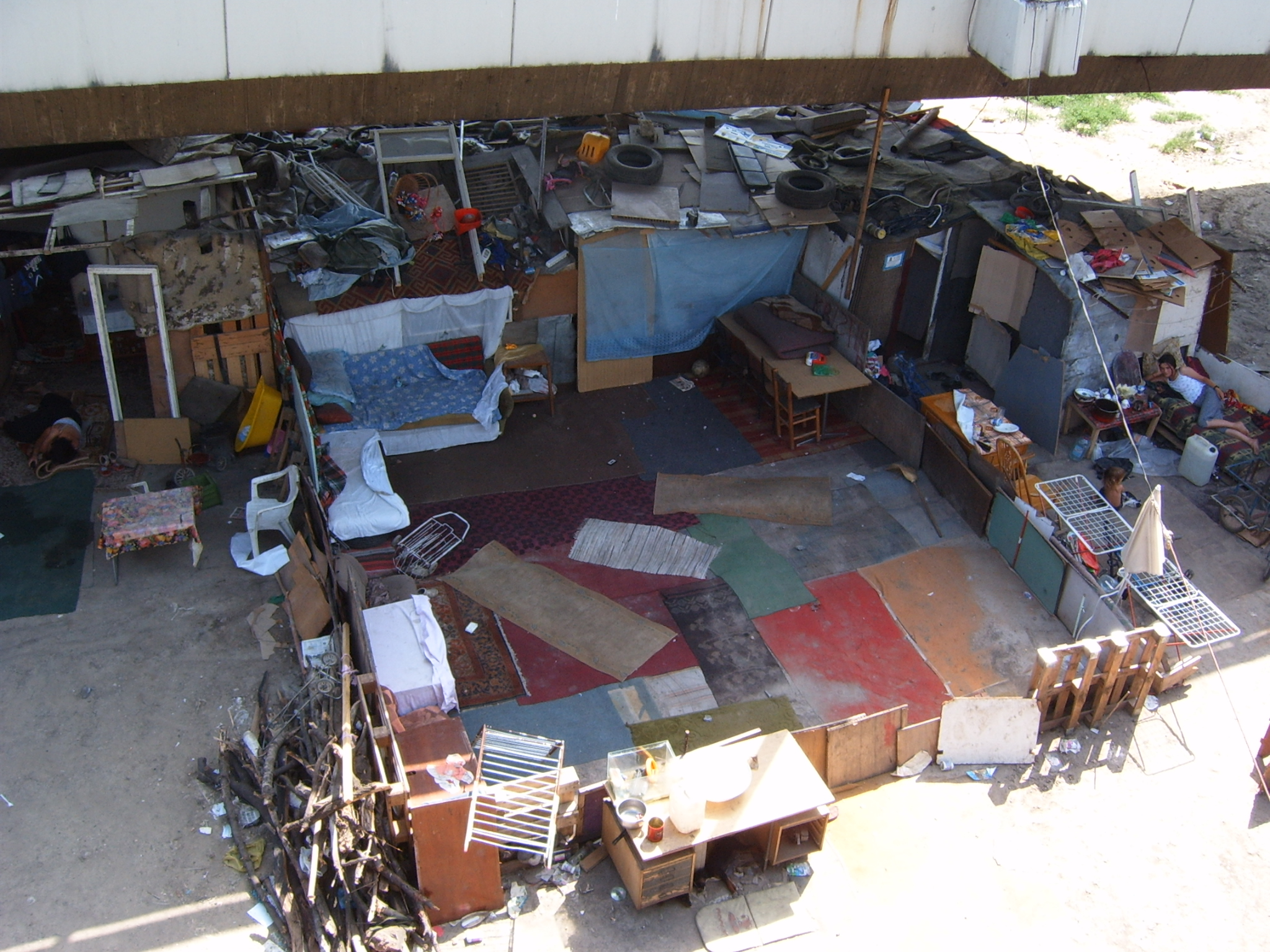
A typical house that existed in the Karton city

The Cardboard city was depopulated on August 31, 2009, following four years of unsuccessful attempts.

The City Government announced in 2005 that it will evict the population from the settlement into a new one, made of the temporary container houses in the area around the neighborhoods of Dr Ivan Ribar and Blokovi. This decision was not received with approval of the local population. They demanded that the city government should disperse the population on the territory of the entire city, especially in Dedinje, the most affluent neighborhood of Belgrade and that simply moving the population without giving them any jobs or education would not make the difference. They claimed that the action was caused by desire of the city government to free the land for construction. Some NGOs supported the city government, also labeling the protesters being racist, but some pointed out that the solution proposed by the city was not good, economically and socially. After months of verbal clashes and protests, city halted the eviction.

In July 2007, city government again announced their wish to relocate an estimated 245 families with 1,500 people from the settlement in spring 2008, due to the planned reconstruction of the Gazela bridge. However, the data on how and where the population will be relocated were not given, but the census of population within the settlement began in August 2007.

In May 2009, the decision was made that the Cardboard city should be evicted by the end of June (a total of 176 families). Families were informed that they will be displaced from the settlement within 45 days. Families residing in Belgrade, 112 of them, will be temporarily displaced in containers that will be placed across Belgrade suburbs, while the remaining 62 families will be returned to their area of origin and would become the responsibility of the Government. Families residing in Belgrade would have the right to social assistance, with the only condition being that their children must attend school. It was announced that the reconstruction and repair of the bridge Gazela can begin immediately after the displacement. On August 31, 2009, the Cardboard city was completely evicted, and all families were resettled in five Belgrade municipalities, or returned to their area of origin outside Belgrade.

== See also ==
- Roma in Serbia
