= ʽAsr =

Qaryat ʽAsr قرية عصر
- Village
- Location in Yemen
- Coordinates: 15.34826°N 44.16058°E
- Country: Yemen
- Governorate: Sanaa
- District: Ma'ain
- Elevation: 7,667 ft (2,337 m)
- Time zone: UTC+3 (Yemen Standard Time)

ʽAsr, or Qaryat ʽAsr (Arabic: قرية عصر Qaryat ‘Aṣr), also transliterated as ʽAsir, is a western suburb of Sanaa, Yemen, located in Main District of Amanat al-Asimah Governorate. It is located just north of the road to al-Hudaydah, at the western edge of the Sanaa plain. The name ʽAsr is also used for the small wadi by the town, as well as the mountain nearby.

== History ==
ʽAsr is mentioned in both the Ghayat al-amani of Yahya ibn al-Husayn and the Kitab al-Simt of Muhammad ibn Hatim al-Yami al-Hamdani, with the earliest reference to it taking place in the year 1198 (594 AH).

In recent decades, ʽAsr has grown from a village into a major suburb of Sanaa, driven in part by the presence of an existing souk, which has grown into a center of commercial activity. The growth is also fueled by some industries relocating to ʽAsr.
