= Parisi Industries, Inc. =

American toy company

Parisi Industries, Inc. is a family-owned stuffed toy factory that resided in Brooklyn, NY.

Frank Parisi, a Sicilian US immigrant that arrived in the 1910s, made Kewpie dolls and later opened a business in Manhattan called Modern Stuffed Toys, which manufactured stuffed animals out of rabbit fur. Later in the 1950s, Parisi's five sons opened their own business. All five of Parisi's sons had a talent for sewing, but each assumed distinctive roles in the operation of their new business; Tony was head of sales, Sam supervised cutting, Herb was in shipping and receiving. Herb's twin, Jimmy, who died in 1974, was production chief. Joe, the eldest brother, was in sales before he retired. Tony and Sam were the creative team, even though neither had any former training in toy design. Sam Parisi states that "When you grow up in a business, you automatically pick it up."

In 1966, the Parisi's relocated their business to East New York. Parisi Industries took in over $1 million a year during their best years. Parisi was one of the largest stuffed toy makers in Brooklyn and opened its doors in 1955. Due to the low cost of imports from places such as China and Haiti, Parisi, like many other in their industry, were driven to close their doors. In 1995, Parisi was seeking a buyer for its struggling business.
