= Hadji Hassan Mahala =

Coordinates: 42°8′54″N 24°45′28″E

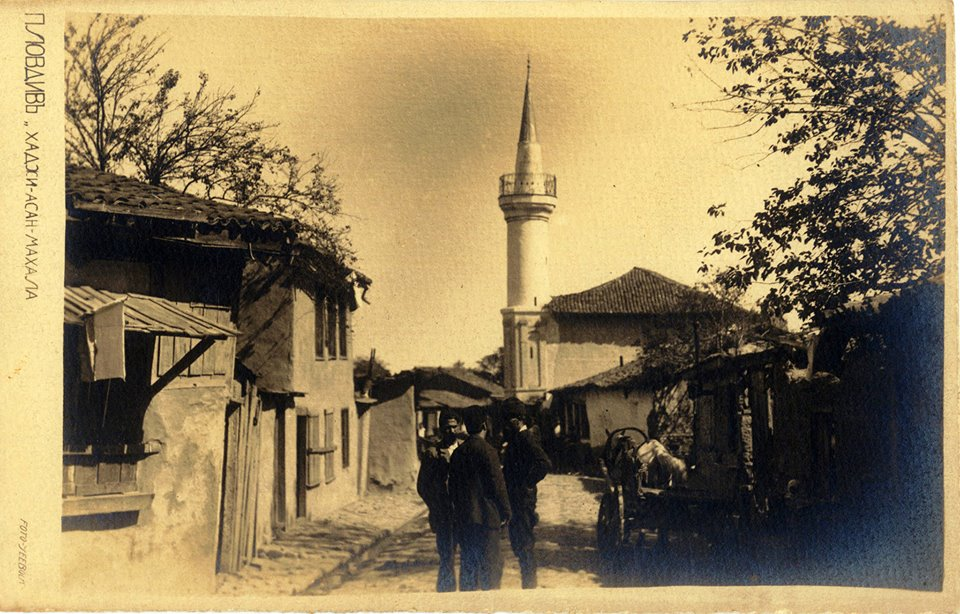
Hadji Hasan Mahala in the early 1900s

Hadji Hassan Mahala (Bulgarian: Хаджи Хасан махала, romanized: Hadzhi Hasan Mahala) is a Roma ghetto in Plovdiv, Bulgaria dating to 1400s. Residents generally regard themselves as being of the Turkish ethnicity. Its name comes from a mosque, itself named after a Turkish military leader who may have founded the neighborhood.
