= Harman Mahala =

Roma ghetto in Plovdiv, Bulgaria

Coordinates: 42°10′1″N 24°44′48″E

Harman Mahala (Bulgarian: Харман махала) is the fourth largest Roma ghetto in Plovdiv, Bulgaria. It is located in the northern part of the city near the road to Karlovo.

It is the smallest living area of Roma representatives, comprising around 2000 people.
