= Sheker Mahala =

Coordinates: 42°9′48″N 24°43′24″E

Sheker Mahala is the second biggest Roma ghetto in Plovdiv. Its population is 10,000. 2,000 of them identify themselves as Roma, the rest identify themselves as people of Turkish origin. In accordance with its Turkish majority and history, the name of the neighborhood is the Slavized version of the Turkish phrase Şeker Mahalle, which literally means "Sugar/Candy Neighborhood". The district is in the northwestern outskirts of the town.
