= Begun Bari =

Human settlement in Bangladesh

Coordinates: 23.763502°N 90.403683°E

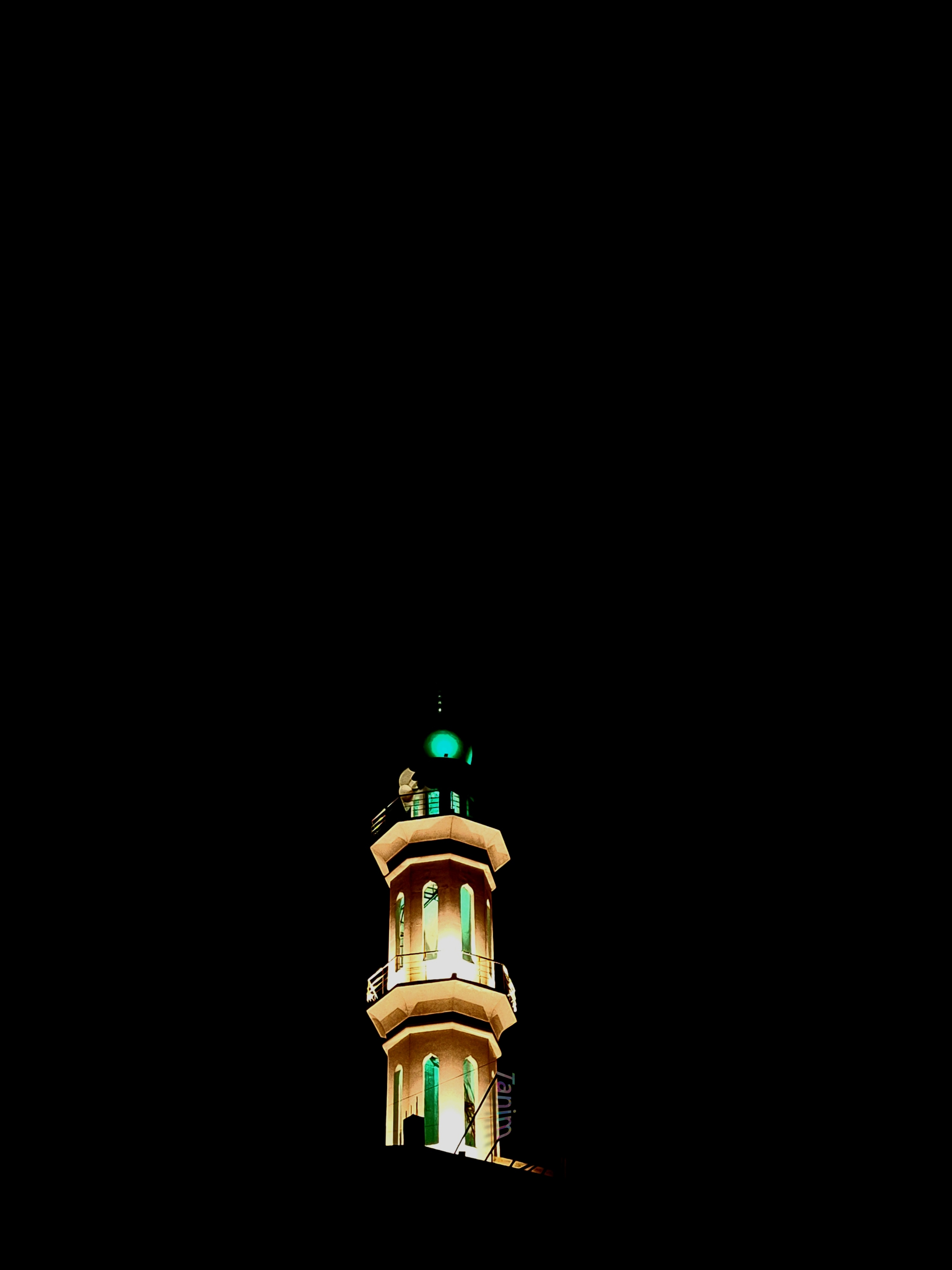
The South Begunbari Jame Mosque.

Begunbari is a neighborhood located in the industrial area of Dhaka.[1] Begunbari falls under the jurisdiction of Tejgaon Industrial Area Police Station in Dhaka, Bangladesh. It primarily belongs to Ward No. 24 of the Tejgaon Industrial Area Police Station, which was formerly part of Ward No. 37. This neighborhood is divided into three parts: South, Central, and North Begunbari.

Several government institutions and some notable private and individual industrial establishments are located in the Begunbari area, including the Bhumi Bhaban, the Technical Teachers' Training College, the Bangladesh Standards and Testing Institution (BSTI), and the Bangladesh Industrial and Technical Assistance Center (BITAC).

Additionally, a number of important educational institutions are situated in Begunbari, such as the Bangladesh University of Textiles (BUTEX), Dhaka Polytechnic Institute, Bangladesh Institute of Glass and Ceramics, and Dhaka Polytechnic Laboratory School. These government institutions have facilities

like student hostels or residential halls, officers' quarters (for example, the Officers’ Quarters of the Bangladesh Power Development Board), as well as staff quarters and dormitories. Among the student hostels are Latif Hostel (Dhaka Polytechnic Institute), Shaheed Aziz Hall (BUTEX), Dr. Kazi Motahar Hossain Hostel (Dhaka Polytechnic Institute), Kobi Nazrul Hostel (Glass and Ceramics Institute), and Zahir Raihan Hostel (Dhaka Polytechnic Institute). Most of these quarters and hostels are located in South and Central Begunbari. According to the 2011 Population Census, there are 9,034 families and 34,517 people living in this area.

== See also ==
- Hatirjheel
