= Salia Sahi =

Largest slum of Odisha, India

Coordinates: 20.302150°N 85.813677°E

Salia Sahi in Bhubaneswar is the largest slum of Odisha, India, spanning over 256 acres and containing a population of over 100,000.
