= Vila Parisi =

== Overview ==
Vila Socó is a "favela" (slum) in Cubatão, Brazil, that was the site of a major industrial oil spill fire on February 25, 1984. 700,000 liters of gas were released, 1,000 homes were destroyed, and 100 people died. The geography of Cubatão prevented rapid dispersal of air pollutants released from the burning fuels. The German sociologist Ulrich Beck used the case of Vila Socó ("The dirtiest chemical town in the world") as an example of the "destructive powers of the developed risk industry."

== Industrial Expansion and Environmental Risks ==
Vila Parisi’s development was deeply tied to Brazil’s mid-20th-century industrial boom, particularly in Cubatão, which became a major petrochemical and steel hub due to its proximity to the larger cities of São Paulo and Santos. This expansion was largely unregulated, and Vila Parisi emerged as an informal settlement for low-income workers, many of whom were employed in nearby industries. Built on a former mangrove swamp, the area lacked sanitation infrastructure, and residents were exposed to extreme pollution levels, resulting in high rates of congenital disorders, respiratory diseases, and other chronic health conditions.

The industrial fire in Vila Parisi, which killed around 100 people, was a direct consequence of this lack of infrastructure, weak safety enforcement, and corporate negligence. Government agencies and industrial firms were aware of the risks posed by outdated pipelines and chemical storage, yet failed to take preventive measures. The surrounding industrial zone, described as a “valley of death” due to its environmental hazards, had long suffered from unchecked emissions, toxic waste dumping, and frequent accidents prior to the incident in early 1984.

The aftermath of the disaster only further highlighted such systemic failures. Issues of displacement, toxic exposure, and economic marginalization disproportionately impacted and continue to affect the residents of Vila Parisi today, exacerbating preexisting social inequalities. Any efforts by organizations such as CETESB (Companhia Ambiental do Estado de São Paulo or The State of São Paulo Environmental Company) to remediate the environmental damage remain slow-moving, and pollution-related health issues persist due to lingering soil and water contamination. Ultimately, Vila Parisi remains a key example of environmental injustice, reflecting broader patterns of industrial expansion at the expense of marginalized communities.
