= Baiganwadi =

- Neighbourhood
- Location in Mumbai, India
- Coordinates: 19.0613°N 72.9258°E
- Country: India
- State: Maharashtra
- District: Mumbai Suburban
- Metro: Mumbai

Languages
  - Official: Marathi
- Time zone: UTC+5:30 (IST)
- PIN: 400 043

Baiganwadi (Shivaji Nagar No:2) is located in Govandi (West), a suburb of Mumbai, India. Baiganwadi has Mumbai's oldest and largest waste dumping ground, divided in plots by crossing roads and gullies.

== Geography ==
Baiganwadi is located between Shivaji Nagr No :1 and Mankhurd. Mumbai's largest waste dumping ground is to its north, and to the east is the Thane Creek.

== Populace and Cultural ==
Baiganwadi is very densely populated. Many people may share the same room (10 Ft. X 15 Ft). Most of the population are immigrants from Bihar and Uttar Pradesh.

== Economy ==
Baiganwadi is one of the worst-hit areas by water shortage in Mumbai. There is no proper water supply in the area. There are plenty of illegal water connections.
