= Korail slum =

Slum in Dhaka, Bangladesh

Korail কড়াইল
- Slum
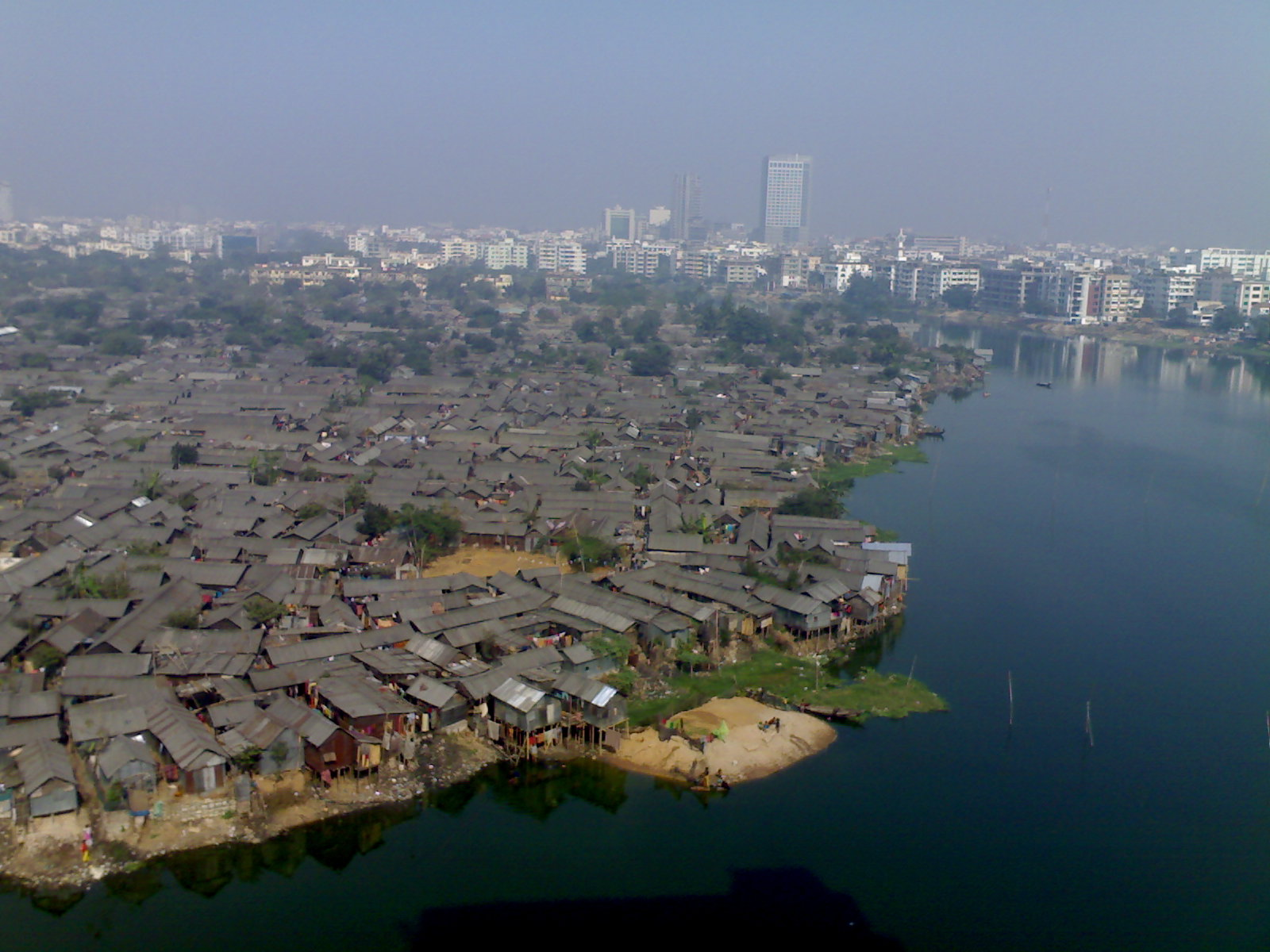
- View of Korail
- Interactive map of Korail
- Coordinates: 23.783116°N 90.410931°E
- Country: Bangladesh
- Division: Dhaka Division
- District: Dhaka District
- City: Dhaka

Language
  - Official: Bangla
- Time zone: UTC+06:00 (BST)

Korail slum (Bengali: কড়াইল বস্তি) is the largest slum in Dhaka, the capital of Bangladesh. It is located next to the neighbourhoods of Mohakhali and Gulshan–Banani.

== History ==
People started squatting in Korail in the 1990s. More than 300,000 people live in the Korail slum. The Korail slum is mainly divided into two parts. These are known as Jamaibazar (Unit 1) and Boubazar (Unit 2). Boubazar has four parts. The Korail slum includes Beltola slum, T&T slum, Baidar slum, Ershadnagar and Godown slum. This slum is spread over an area of more than 160 acres.

Generally, low-income people live in these slums. According to the national Daily Inqilab in 2016, criminal activity in this slum was increasing.

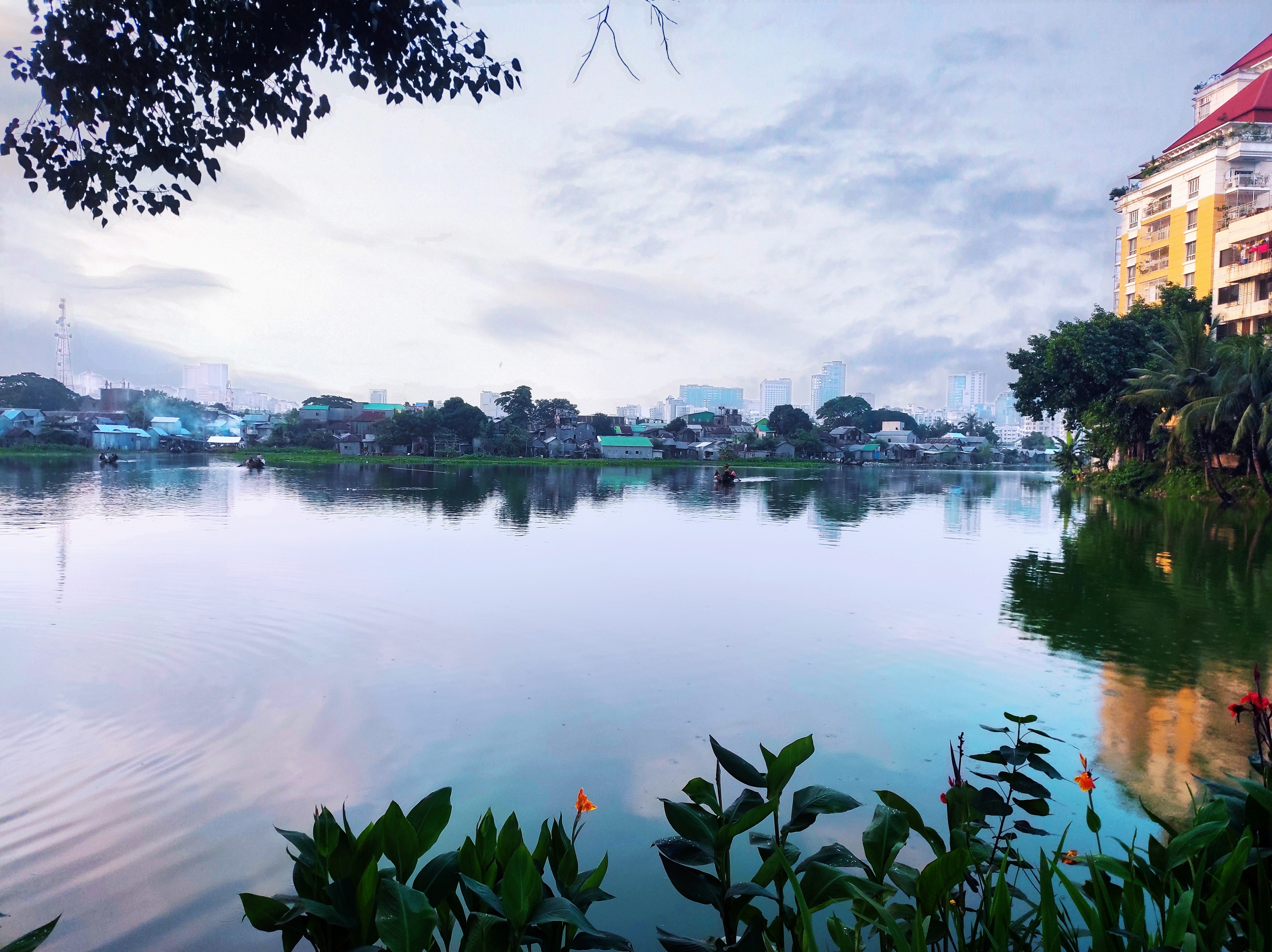
Korail slum view from Gulshan–Banani lake

Fires have often broken out in this slum.
