= Elrow =

Spanish electronic music event organizer

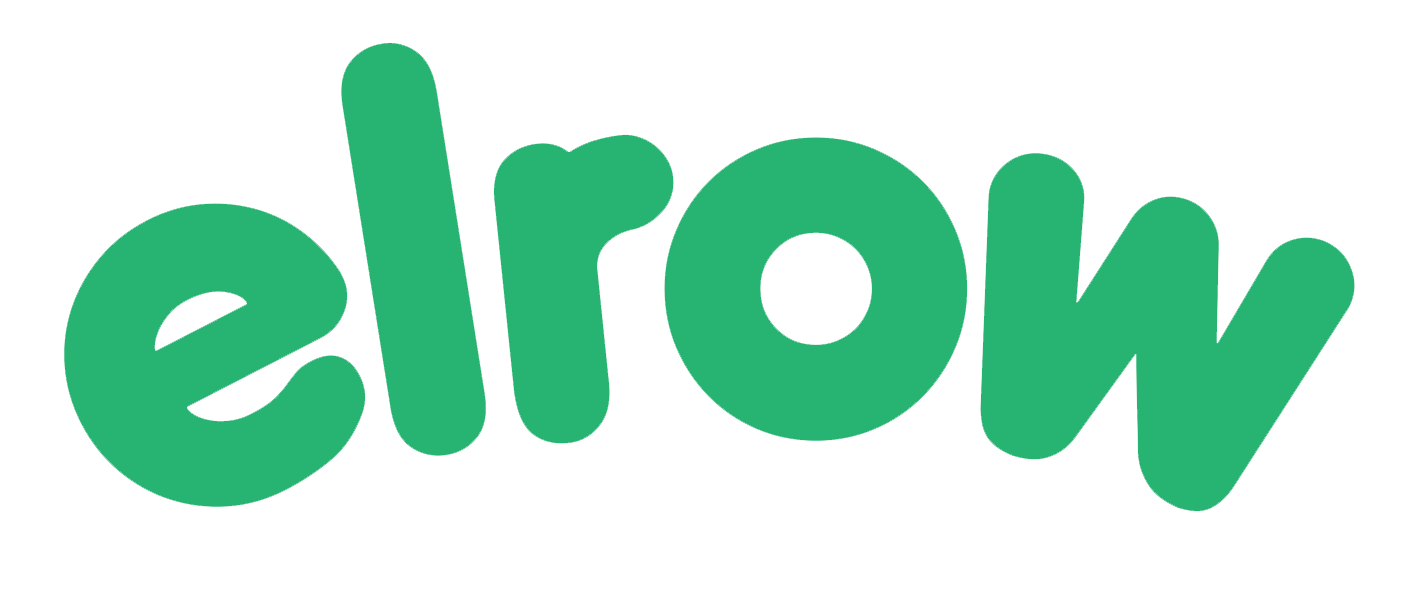

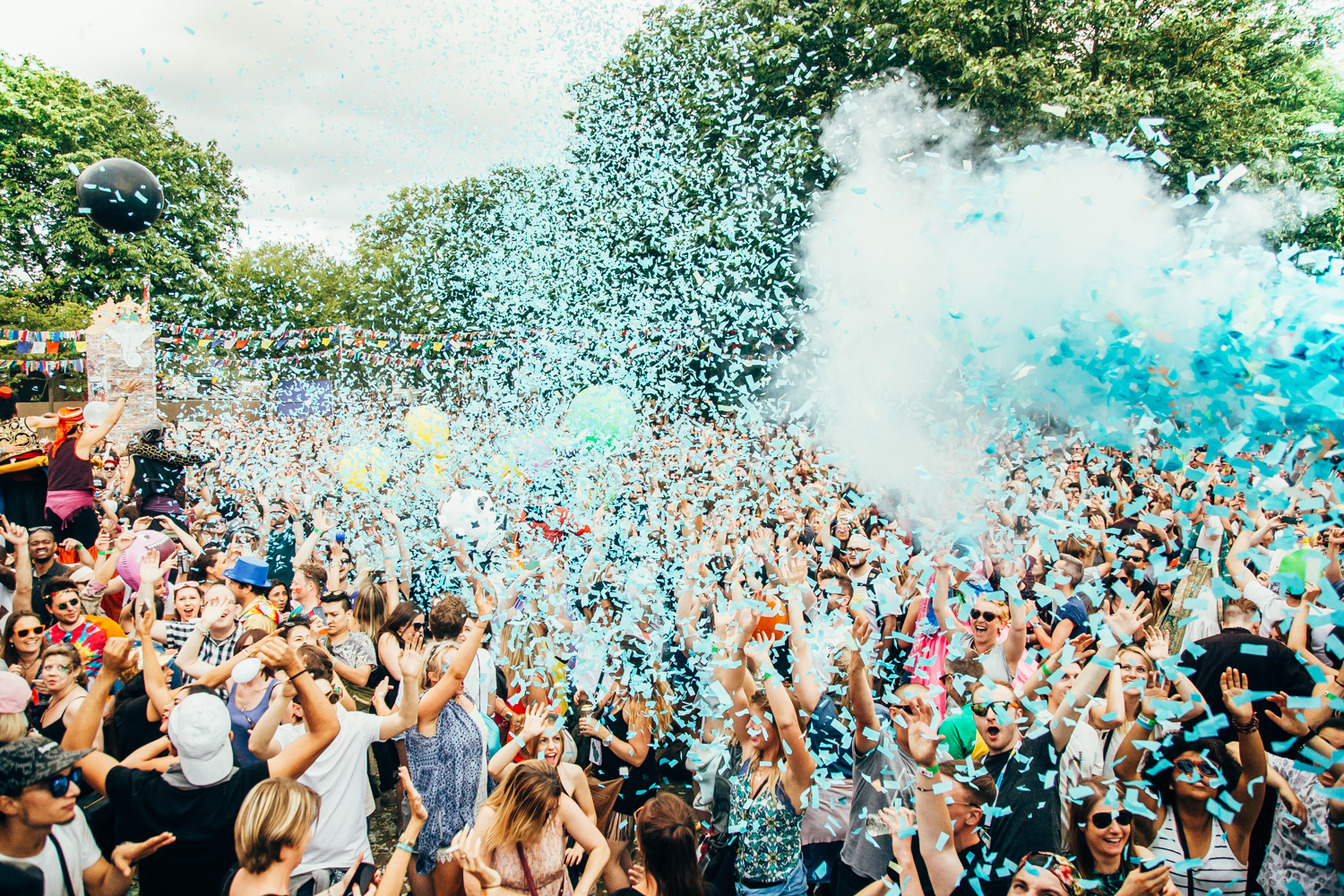
- elrow event at the 2015 Lovebox Festival
- Formation: June 9, 2010; 15 years ago
- Type: Privately held company
- Headquarters: Barcelona, Spain
- Products: Elrow Music (label)
- Services: event management and music festivals
- President: Vicenç Martí
- CEO: Juan Arnau Lasierra
- Creative and marketing director: Cruz Arnau Lasierra
- Website: elrow.com

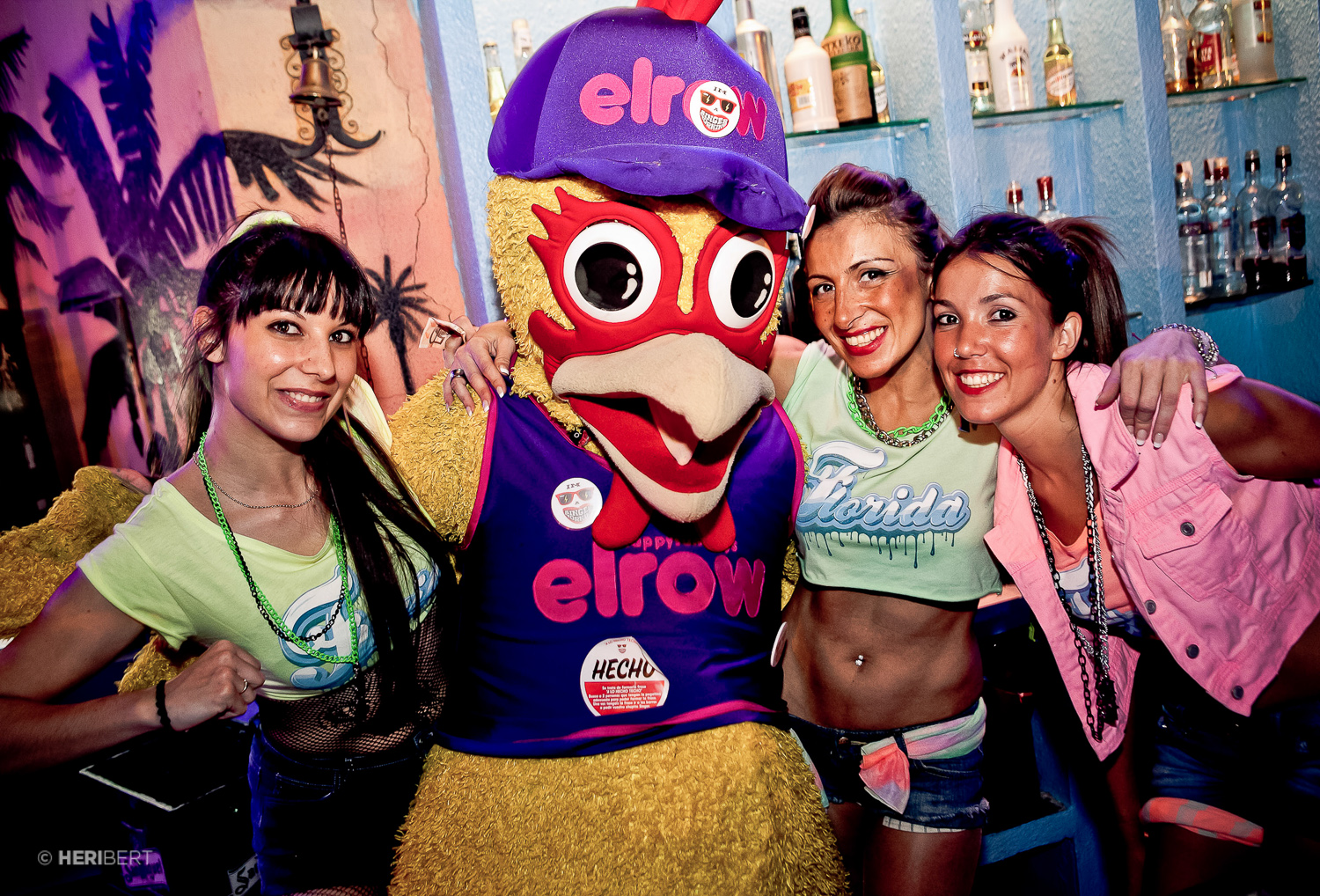
elrow's official mascot, Rowgelia, posing with Florida 135 employees.

Elrow (stylized elrow) is a Spanish company that organizes electronic dance music events internationally and specializes in Techno and House music. Its headquarters are in Viladecans, south of Barcelona. According to the company itself, they have held more than 150 events, in 67 cities in 26 different countries, with a total of 2.3 million attendees and 800 DJs (2016).

elrow is a family business, since there have been six generations of the Satorres-Durán-Arnau family that have dedicated themselves to leisure, since the Café Josepet in Fraga opened in 1870.

elrow parties have managed to differentiate themselves from other similar events by including numerous artistic and festive elements (confetti, costumes, inflatables, makeup, decoration, props, performances...) with an immersive effect, which has earned their parties ratings like "hedonistic", "colorful", "crazy", and "extravagant". Sometimes they even include recreational items like Springboards, slides, or ball pools. More than 100 actors participate in a single event, including acrobats, Clowns, jugglers, stilt walkers... In addition, each event is marked by a theme (for example, the April Fair of Seville, the Mexican Día de Muertos or the American Old West), so all the decoration and costumes are focused on it, and attendees are encouraged to dress according to the theme.

In 2010 they changed their name to the current one and adopted a new business model, that of "traveling parties", whereby their events stopped having a single physical location, to start organizing parties all over the world: Asunción, Brighton, Cairo, Cape Town, Dubai, Florence, Frankfurt am Main, London, CDMX, Miami, Montreal, Moscow, Phuket, Shenzhen, Taipei, Tokyo, Venice... and some fifty more.

The current president of the company is Vicenç Martí, the CEO is Juan Arnau Jr. and the creative and marketing director is Cruz Arnau, his sister. Both are co-founders of elrow and children of Juan Arnau Sr. The board of directors includes James Barton (CEO of Superstruct E.) and Roderik A. Schlösser (CEO of Providence Equity London) since the association with Superstruct Entertainment in 2017.

elrow's official mascot is a yellow chicken in lilac clothes named Rowgelia.

== History ==
=== Origins (1870–2001) ===
In 1870, José Josepet Satorres, a farmer from Fraga, Aragon, opened the Café Josepet in this town (Barrón Promenade, nº 2, located on the left bank of the river Cinca), which would later become a social club. Due to his gambling problem, he had to close the café, which in 1900, once he died, his family (headed by his granddaughter's husband, Antonio Durán) would reopen under the new name of Bar Victoria, to which he would add a Theater Victoria (later, Victoria Cinema). At that time, the Victoria social club would become the main leisure center in the Lower Cinca region. In 1952–53, due to a marriage between the Durán and the Arnau family, the family business expanded, and in addition to the Victoria Cinema, they also began to manage the nearby Florida Cinema-Theater.

During the 60s the first nightclubs appeared in Spain, in which the orchestras were replaced by DJs, and in 1973 the Florida Discotheque Fraga was opened, better known by its definitive name Florida 135, whose setting was inspired by the Bronx, and where the new trends of electronic music were heard: disco, electropop, goa trance, house and acid, the Catalan màkina and the Valencian bakalao, among others.

In 1993, the family organized an event on a farm in the Monegros Desert called Monegros Party, which was attended by 200 friends. This event has continued to be forged until today, the famous Monegros Desert Festival.

=== Relocation to Barcelona (2001–) ===
In 2001, Fraga's company moved to Barcelona, and they started some sessions called Row began in a Nick Havanna club (Roussillon street, Barcelona). But since this club is not owned by the family, in 2008 the Arnaus acquired their own larger plot on the outskirts of the city, in Viladecans (near El Prat airport) and reopened it under the name Row 14.

==== 2010, foundation of elrow ====
Since the company, as agreed with the Viladecans City Council, can only hold 12 annual parties on this plot, in 2010 the company announced a new business model based on "traveling" parties. In other words, organizing events around the world, either in the context of a music festival, obtaining residencies in other venues, such as Amnesia Ibiza, or independently.

In addition, it was decided to add the article el ("the") to the name to make it sound more "Spanishized" and thus, make it more recognizable.

==== Association with Superstruct Entertainment (2017) ====
In February 2017, elrow established a partnership and investment agreement with entertainment platform Superstruct Entertainment, backed by investment company Providence Equity Partners, one of the largest in the world. Superstruct Entertainment is chaired by James Barton, founder of the Creamfields festival (UK), and is the same one that in 2018 acquired 60–80% of the Sònar festival (also in Barcelona), the Sziget Festival in Budapest and 85 other events in many countries.

"The Elrow team has created a unique experience that is loved by fans. We are excited to partner and support such an impressive team and we look forward to unlocking new growth opportunities for their businesses."

— James Barton, 2017

==== Shooting in Playa del Carmen (2017) ====
In January 2017, a shooting took place at the Blue Parrot nightclub in Playa del Carmen, near Cancún (Mexico), at the event that elrow organized for The BPM festival. Linked to a dispute between Mexican drug traffickers, this shooting resulted in 5 deaths, 15 injuries and a "stampede effect" among those attending the party. None of the 30 employees hired by elrow were injured, but the head of security for the event did die when he tried to intervene. 3 suspects were arrested, and the festival management decided to cancel the rest of the events. See also: Ataques en Playa del Carmen y Cancún de 2017.

==== elrow Friends and Family (2017) ====
In April 2017, elrow announced that in July of that same year the Friends & Family music festival would take place in Salou, a town on the Catalan Golden Coast, with an intention of 25,000 attendees. However, shortly thereafter, elrow released an official statement announcing that it would be canceled due to "political disputes in the region", since the event was coordinated with the Salou City Council, but apparently the neighboring town of Vila-seca was not informed. This added to the refusal of the Tarragona Port Authority to locate the festival in its area and the general feeling of rejection among the residents of the town to another macro-festival, in memory of the old tragic Saloufest (2001–2016). Finally, an event was held on the same day at the elrow site in Viladecans.

==== Alex and Amy cases ====
On 16 July 2017, Alex Masterson, a 19-year-old Briton, died at Bellvitge Hospital due to cardiac arrest after several days of partying in Salou and finally went to elrow de Viladecans on Sunday, where he took MDMA. His friends criticized "that the water was very expensive, 4€ for a 100 ml bottle. You had to wait about 15 minutes to drink, from the amount of people there were". Elrow's management replied that "during a surveillance round we found the boy very agitated. He was notified to an ambulance, where he was stabilized and transferred to the hospital (...) He died four or five hours later at the Bellvitge Hospital due to cardiac arrest. The party had ended hours ago (...) even the Mossos d'Esquadra congratulated us on the excellent organization".

Despite this, the municipal authority confirmed that elrow scrupulously complies with all regulations and security requirements and that "it is not a particularly conflictive place".

On 21 August of that same year, the young British Amy Vigus died in Colchester Hospital (England), a day after attending the Elrow Town festival in London. Apparently she took fake MDMA.

== Topics ==
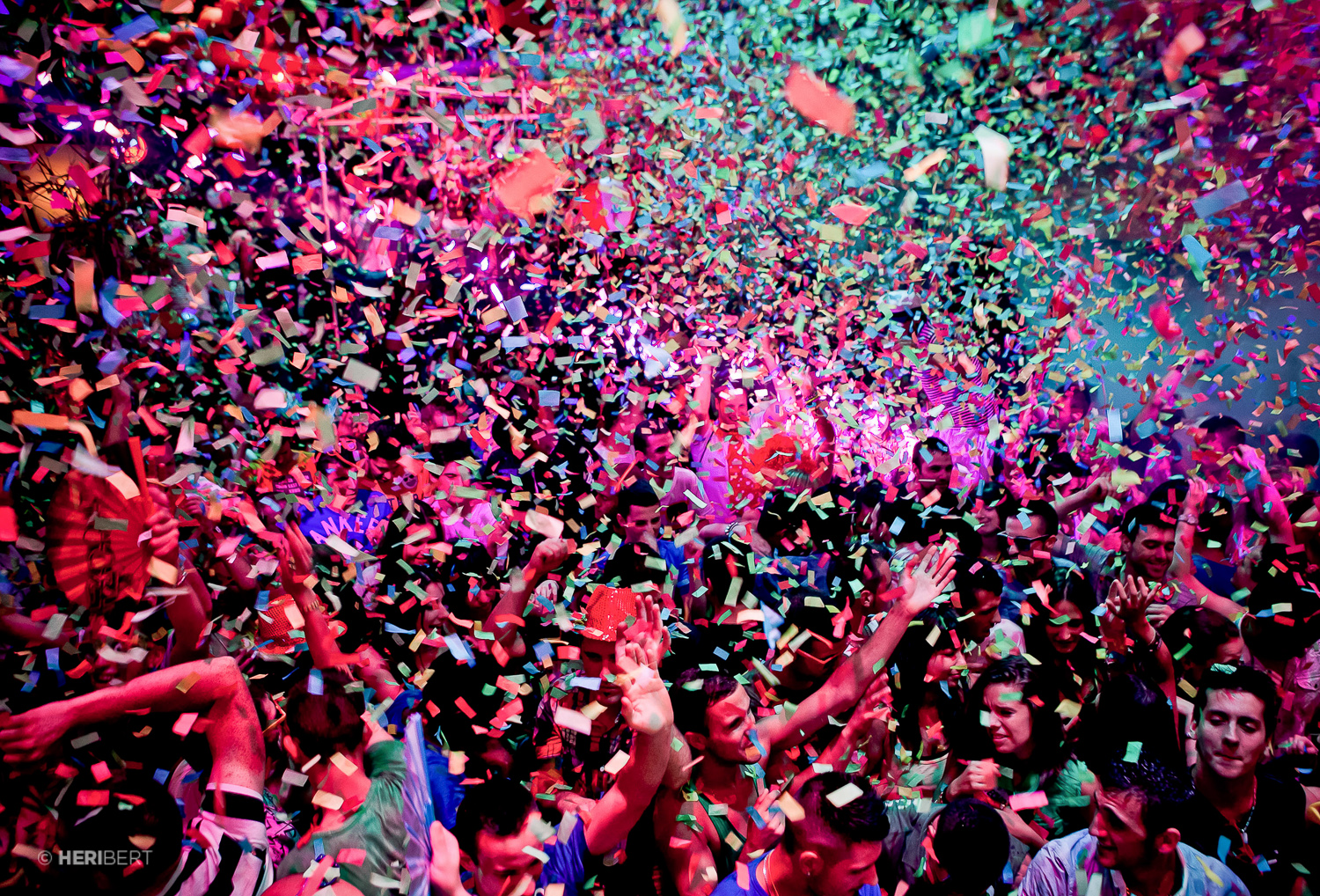
The Singer Morning event, by elrow (2013).

According to the 2020 press material, the themes that elrow handles for its events are the following:

- El Bowsque Encantado ('The Enchanted Forest'), inspired by traditional European Fairy tales
- Brownx, inspired by the hip hop subculture of The Bronx, New York
- Far Rowest, inspired by Westerns and the Old West
- Las Filipinas ('The Philippines'), inspired by hipster subculture and vintage fashion
- From lost to the River (literal translation of a Spanish popular saying), inspired by "Rowgelia's farm" and the country world, including country aesthetics
- Horroween, Halloween special, with horror aesthetics
- Nowmads Nuevo Mundo, amalgamating different aesthetics of the world from different times
- El Príncipe de Zamunda ('Prince of Zamunda'), mixing New York and African aesthetics, inspired by the film Coming to America (1988)
- Psychowdelic Trip, inspired by the hippie subculture
- El Rowcío, inspired by the Seville April Fair and Spanish culture; the name refers to the El Rocío pilgrimage
- Rowllywood, inspired by oriental art, especially Indian culture
- Rowlympic Games, inspired by the ancient Olympic Games and Ancient Rome
- ElRow Music, inspired by the 80s aesthetics and the pop culture of the last century
- Sambowdromo Do Brasil, inspired by the carnival of Rio and the Brazilian culture
- Rowmuda Triangle, inspired by the marine world and pirate aesthetics; the name comes from the "Bermuda Triangle"

== Resident DJs ==
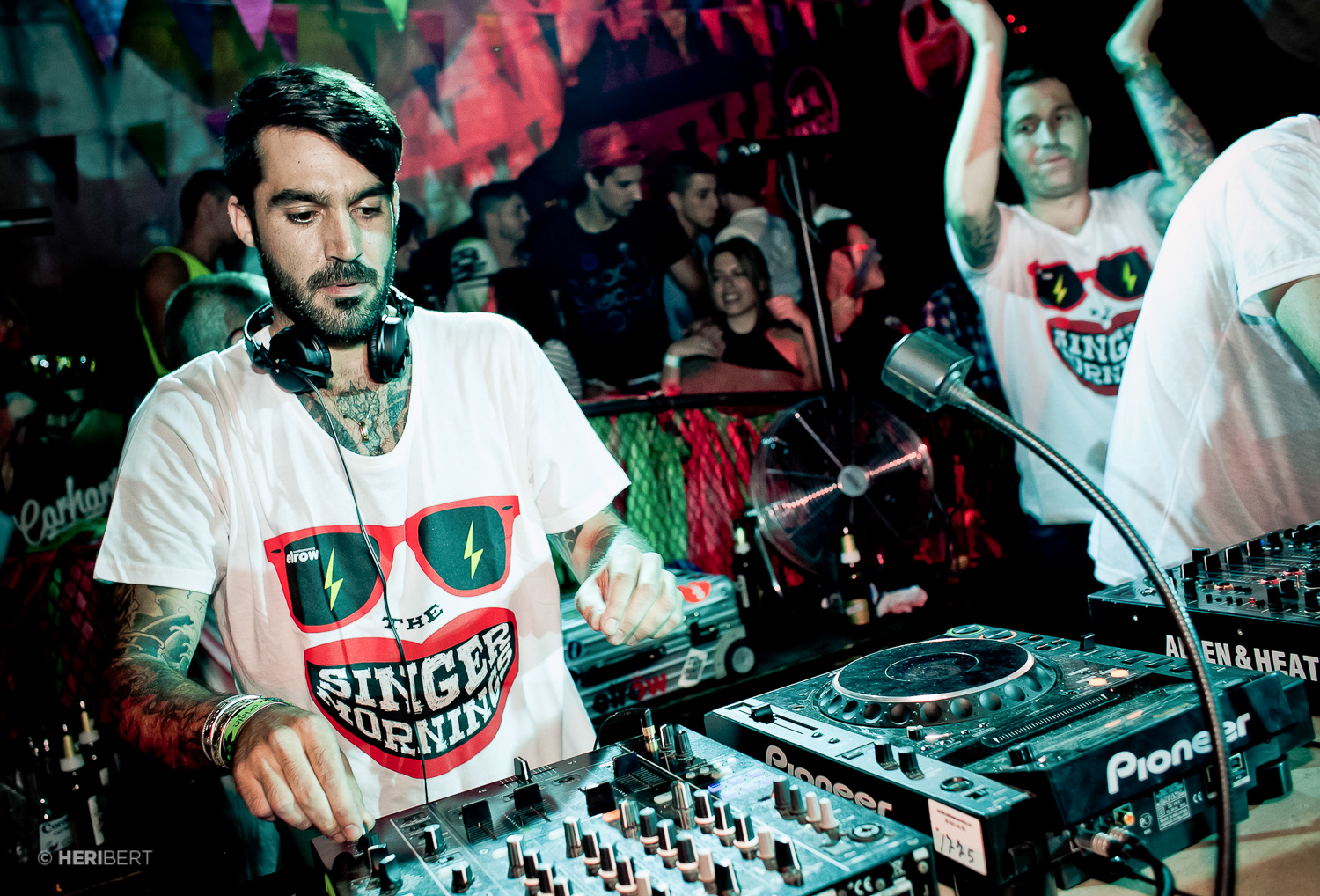
Marc Maya, resident DJ of elrow

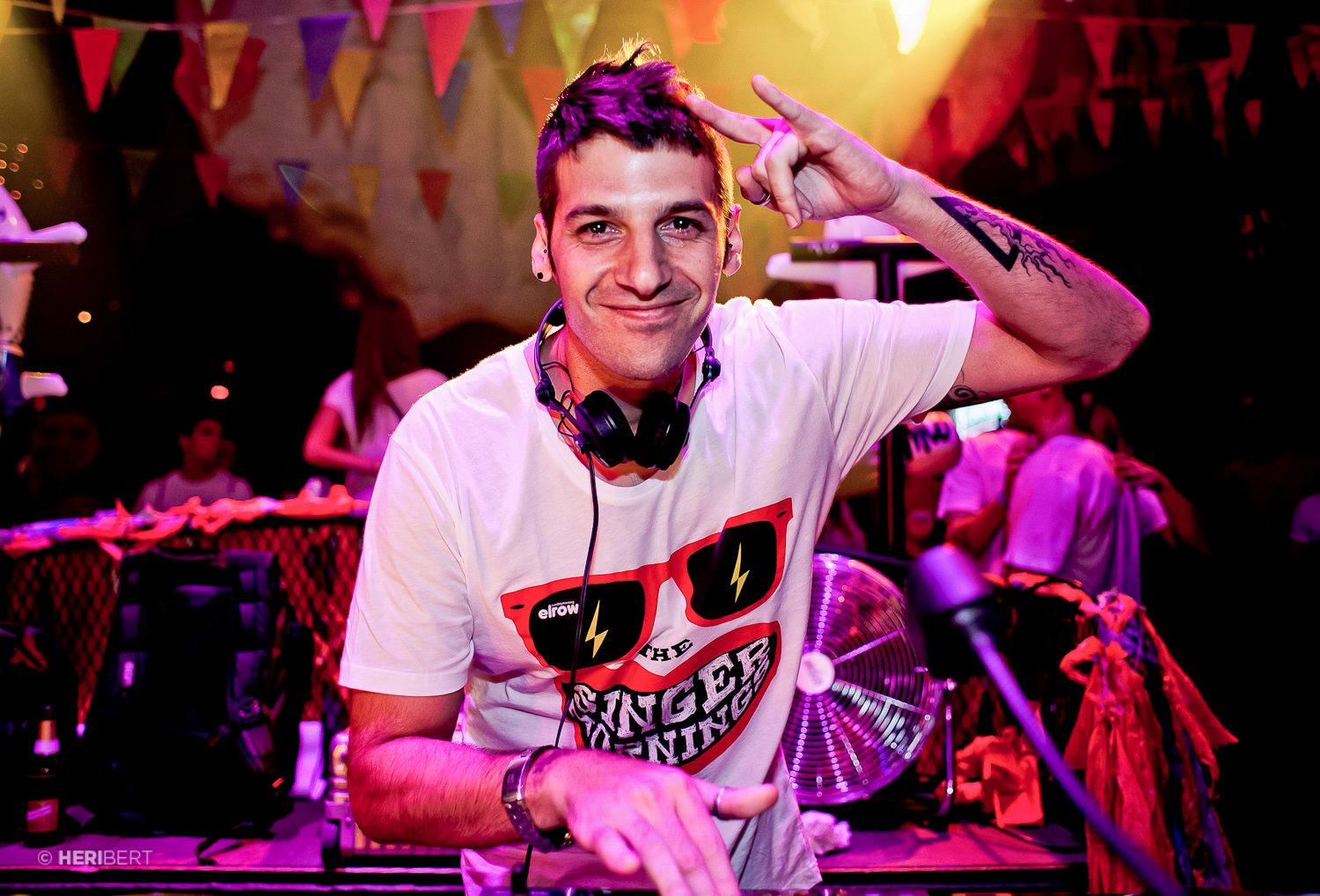
Andrés Campo, resident DJ of elrow

Current elrow residents are:

- Alex Pott (Sitges), varies between house and techno, with a dynamic funk style and a touch of acid.
- Andrés Campo (Huesca, 1984), also a resident of Florida 135, his style is purely techno, sometimes minimal and sometimes tech house.
- Bastian Bux (Barcelona), his style is eclectic, melodic and somewhat acid, with a musical range that vacillates between deep house and progressive techno.
- Baum (Barcelona), although varied in style, his sessions are popular for being "made to not stop dancing." His music is identified as pure house.
- De La Swing (Madrid), he started in 2003 as an audio engineer and learned dee-jay influenced by techno, drum & bass and dubstep.
- Eddy M (Messina, Sicily), whose music can be identified as tech house.
- George Privatti (Martorell, 1987), with tendencies towards hard-groove and tribal house.
- Ion Pananides (Ibiza), he studied audio engineering and soon immersed himself in the world of DJing. His style is eclectic, from the most melodic to the most hypnotic.
- Julius (Barcelona), signed in 2017 by elrow for its sounds that vary between house and techno with funk style.
- Marc Maya (Barcelona), whose stage name in the 90s was Marc Huardi. He was one of the DJs who started Row 14, elrow's predecessor. His style has been described as "dynamic" and "versatile".
- Mario Biani (Barcelona), who has played at Florida 135 and Row 14. His style ranges from minimal techno to hardcore or tribal house.
- Tini Gessler (Friedrichshafen, Germany, 1990), that moves between house and techno, and tech house with a deep underground style. He has played in the iconic Rioma in Mexico City and in Space and Pachá in Ibiza.
- Toni Varga (La Coruña, 1985), who is also a resident of ElRow Sundays and Florida 135. He has an "elegant" tech house style of music.
- Viviana Casanova (Santiago de Chile), mix deep, tech house and techno, with hip hop influences on the beats.

== Sponsors ==
The current sponsoring brands of elrow events are Desperados (Heineken International), Absolut Vodka (Pernod Ricard S.A.) and Desigual (Inditex S. A.).

== Awards and nominations ==
| Year | Award | Designation | Outcome |
|---|---|---|---|
| 2017 | DJ Awards | "Ibiza Night" | Winner |
| 2018 | Vicious Music Awards | "Best Ibiza Party" | Winner |
| 2018 | Vicious Music Awards | "Best +500 Party" | Winner |

=== Rankings ===
| Year | Author | Designation | Outcome |
|---|---|---|---|
| 2017 | Billboard | The 25 Greatest Dance Clubs of All Time | #11 |

== Headquarters ==
The elrow headquarters (informally called elrow House or elrowia) is located on the C-31 highway, in the municipality of Viladecans, a few meters from Las Filipinas beach (or La Murtra beach) in the Llobregat River Delta nature reserve.

- C-31 – km 186

In addition to the Viladecans headquarters, elrow also has workshops, logistics centers and / or warehouses in Barcelona, Ibiza City, New York City, Shanghai, São Paulo and Buenos Aires.

== Collaborations with artists ==
- Okuda San Miguel (2019), to create the Kaos Garden.
- Xavier Regàs (1985), for the remodeling of the Florida 135 club.

== Controversies ==
One of elrow's parties was accused of cultural appropriation and event organisers apologised and withdrew promotional material after complaints from local community members.

== See also ==
- Boiler Room
- Viladecans
- Florida 135, oldest nightclub in Spain, also owned by the Arnau family
