= Streamline =

Streamline may refer to:

== Business ==
- Streamline Air, American regional airline
- Adobe Streamline, a discontinued line tracing program made by Adobe Systems
- Streamline Cars, the company responsible for making the Burney car

== Engineering ==
- Streamlines, streaklines, and pathlines, in fluid flows
- Streamliner, a vehicle shaped to be less resistant to air

== Media ==
- Streamline Pictures, an American distribution company best known for distributing English dubbed Japanese animation
- Streamline Studios, an independent Dutch outsourcing and game developing studio
- Hal Roach's Streamliners, a series of short films made in the 1940s
- Streamline (character), a fictional super-hero character
- Stream Line, the English title of the 1976 Italian film La linea del fiume starring Philippe Leroy
- Streamline, a newsletter published by the Migrant Clinicians Network

== Music ==
- Streamline Ewing (1917–2002), American jazz trombonist
- Streamline (Lenny White album), 1978
- Streamline (Lee Greenwood album), 1985
- "Streamline" (song), a 1994 song by Newton
- "Streamline", a song by System of a Down from the 2002 album Steal This Album!
- "Streamline", a song by Pendulum from the 2005 album Hold Your Colour
- "Streamline", a song by From Autumn to Ashes from the 2005 album Abandon Your Friends
- "Streamline", a song by VNV Nation from the 2011 album Automatic

== Other ==
- Streamline (film), an Australian film directed by Tyson Wade Johnston
- Orel VH2 Streamline, a French aircraft design
- Streamline (swimming), the position a swimmer takes underwater after pushing off a pool wall
- Streamline Moderne, an architectural style related to Art Deco
- Operation Streamline, a program in the United States to prosecute illegal immigrants
- Streamline, a brand of the United States Playing Card Company

== See also ==
- Drag (physics)
- Optimization (computer science)
- Process optimization
- Rightsizing
- Streamlining the cities
