= Newton (band) =

Spanish electronic music group

- Origin: Spain
- Genres: Mákina
- Years active: 1994–1997
- Labels: Lethal Records, SPG Music
- Past members: J. J. Verdu; José Vicente Molla; Juan Carlos Pla

Newton is a Spanish band, famous for their song "Streamline". It was composed of the members J. J. Verdu, Juan Carlos Pla and José Vicente Molla. Their style was mákina, an electronic music style very famous in Spain during the 1990s. The band also made music under pseudonyms, such as Carlton, Crazy Heaven, Edison or Omega.

In 2006, a shortened version of Streamline was featured in a Pepsi commercial featuring Saturday Night Live host Jimmy Fallon, allowing the group to gain brief popularity in the United States.

On 16 July 2021 Newton released a new album Don't Stop Believin, which featured a dance cover of Journey's 1981 song "Don't Stop Believin'".

== Discography ==
Singles

- 1994 – "Streamline"
- 1996 – "Wanna Dance All Day"
- 1997 – "Stretch"

Albums

- 2010 - "The Album"
- 2010 - "Cologne Citywaves"
- 2015 - "Immortalized"
- 2016 - "Roads to Hear"
- 2018 - "Tanto Faz, Mas Quem Me Dera"
- 2019 - "Newton's Carnival, Vol.1"
- 2019 - "Newton's Carnival, Vol.2"
- 2021 - "Don't Stop Believin'"
