= Florida 135 =

Nightclub in Spain

Coordinates: 41°31′09.4″N 0°20′54.5″E

- La Catedral del Techno
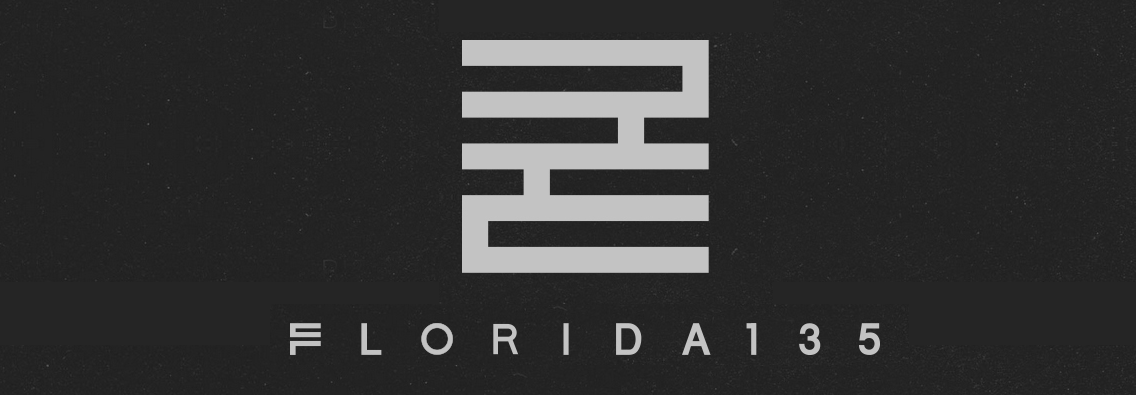

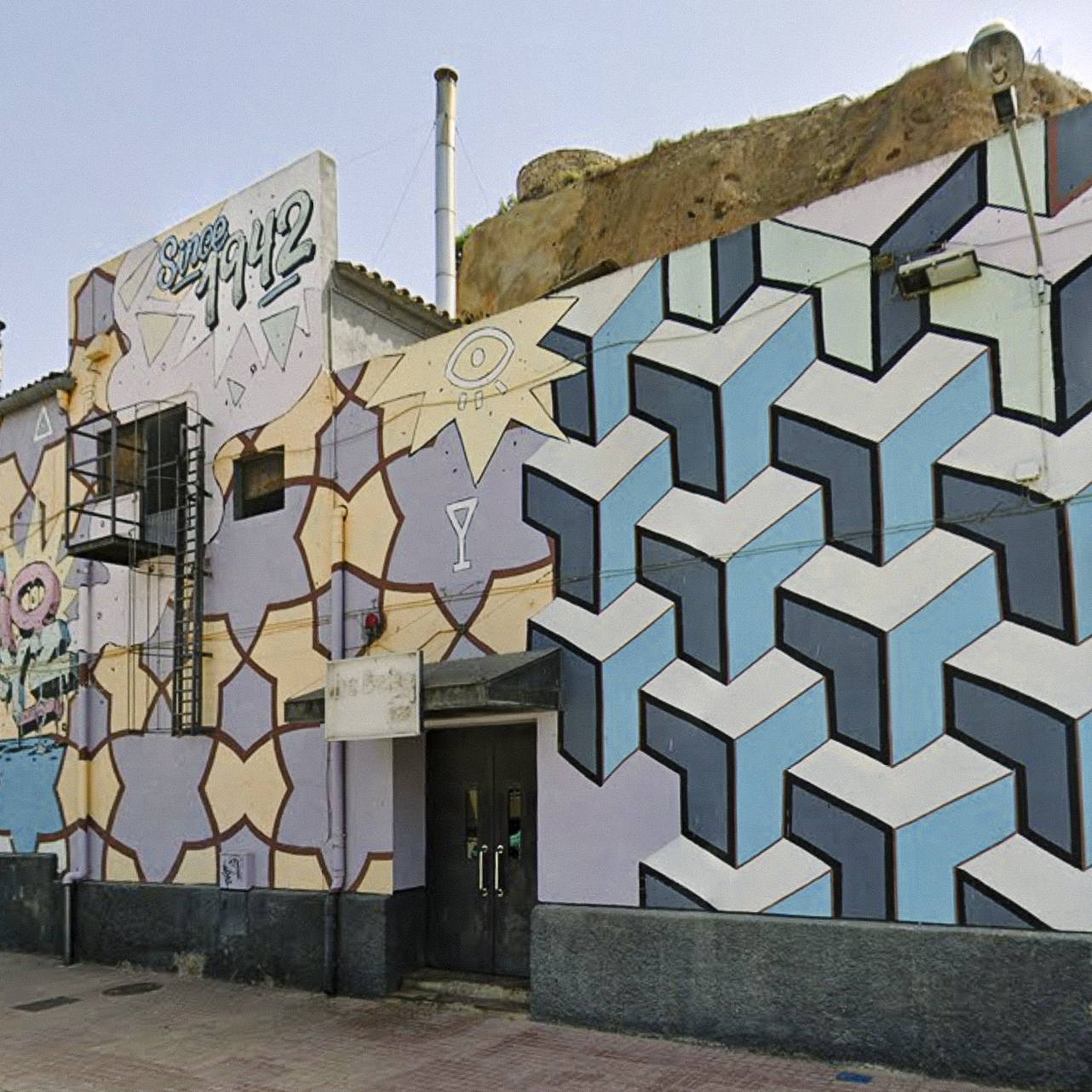
- Façade of the club painted by the graffiti artists Aryz and Vicio
- Interactive map of Florida 135
- Location: Sotet Road 2, Fraga, Spain

Construction
- Opened: December 5, 1942

Website
- f135.com

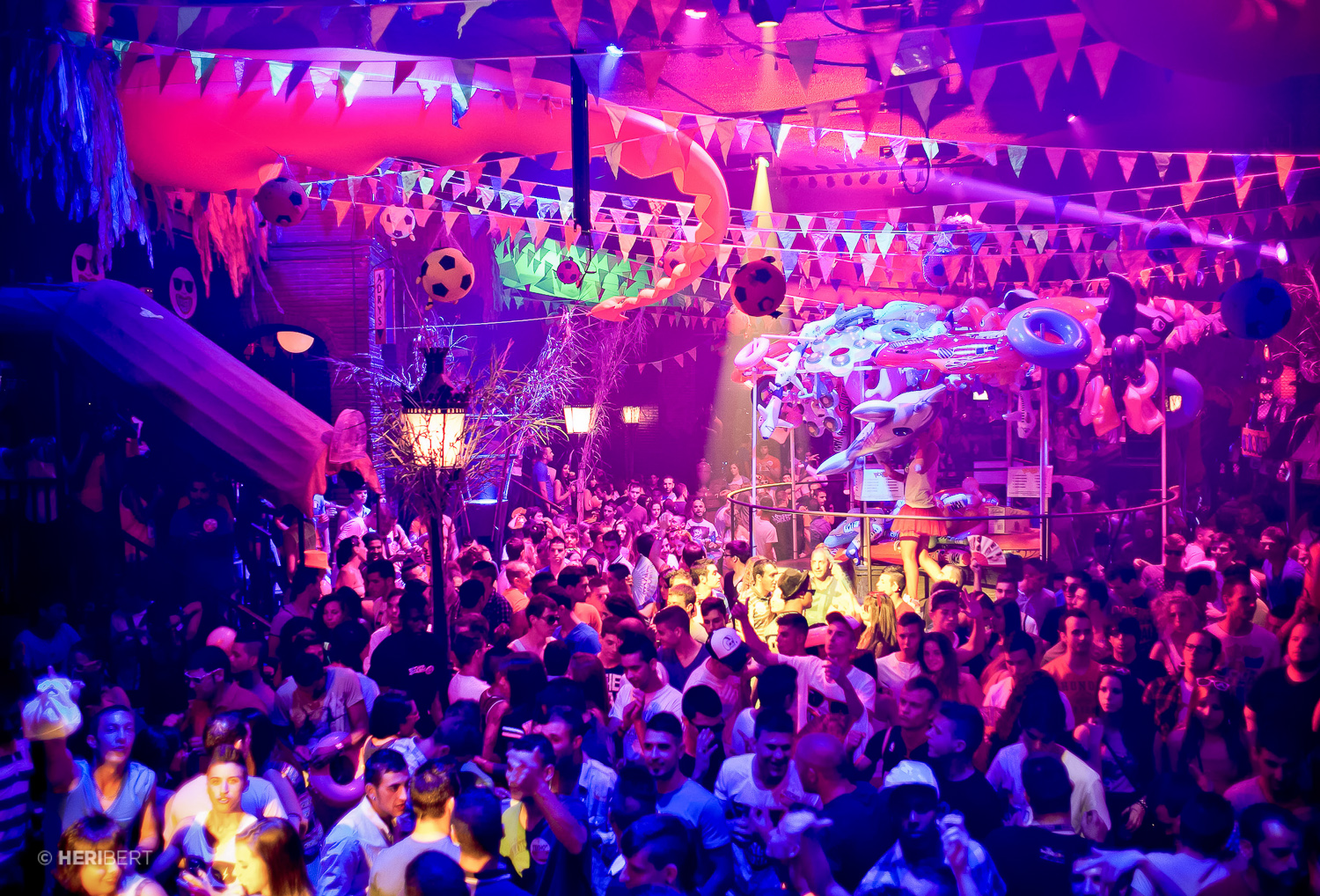
elrow event at Florida 135.

The Florida 135 club is an electronic music nightclub in Fraga, Aragon, Spain. It is considered the oldest active nightclub in the country. It is also a family business, since its foundation in 1942 by Juan Arnau Ibarz, it has remained in the Arnau family until today, the same one that created and conducts the Monegros Desert Festival in neighboring Candasnos and elrow in Viladecans. The Florida 135 is nicknamed "the Cathedral of Techno".

== History ==
Throughout its history, the club has received various names and also different functions. At first it was opened as a movie theater. It was founded in 1942 by Juan Arnau and Francisca Ibarz, a married couple who fled from nearby Aitona because their families disapproved of their marriage due to ideological differences (the Arnau were Republicans, while the Ibarz were Nationalists). Apparently, they named their establishment Florida Cinema because a friend of the couple had a California Bar which was very profitable, and encouraged them to use the name of an American state.

In 1952, Juan and Francisca's son, Juan Arnau, married the Durán-Satorres' daughter, Pilar Durán (see: History of elrow), the owners of a rival movie theater in Fraga, the Victoria Cinema. Thanks to this, both businesses were merged, turning the Arnau family into the main organizers of Fraga's leisure. Initially, it was Pilar's uncle, Santiago Satorres, who acted as the "neutral" manager of both businesses. Juan Arnau later devised a dance hall attached to the cinema called Garden Terrace Florida, and later Saloon Florida.

In 1973, this Saloon would reopen as the Florida Discotheque Fraga, replacing the orchestras with DJs. In 1976 it would suffer a terrible fire. In 1985 the remodeling of the club was carried out by the renowned Catalan interior designer Xavier Regàs i Pagès, who also designed several nightclubs such as Sunset in Madrid, Barbella and Bales in Palma de Mallorca or the Boccacio (where the Gauche Divine met) in Barcelona, among others. It was finally renamed Florida 135, in honor of 135th Street in The Bronx, New York City (later it would be renamed for a brief time Florida 135 Tendenze Club). Regàs was in charge of setting the club in The Bronx, inspired by the films Blade Runner (1982) and West Side Story (1961).

Year after year, the Florida 135 club was forging itself as one of the most iconic electronic clubs in Spain. At Florida 135, the new trends in electronic music were heard: disco, electropop, goa trance, house and acid, the Catalan màkina and the Valencian bakalao. In recent decades, its musical style has focused specifically on house and techno, and has established itself as the oldest discoteca in Spain.

In 2008, the Arnau family had to close the Florida Cinema due to the Spanish movie theater crisis. In the following years the clubbing crisis would come too, although fortunately the Florida Club managed to adapt and not go bankrupt. Between 2008 and 2019, 64% of the nightclubs in Spain closed, some legendary ones such as Anaconda in Baracaldo (1973-2017) or The Buddha and Gabana clubs in Madrid (1996-2018). In 2019, the Arnau signed an agreement with the City Council of Fraga, in which they gave up their old Florida cinema for 50 years to reopen it as a public theater and auditorium. According to the mayor of Fraga, Carmen Costa (PP), “the building will be baptized as Theater-Auditorium Florida", and "it will help revitalize the old town".

Between May 15 and June 1, 2013, the Barcelona graffiti artists Aryz and Pepe Vicio embellished the façade of the club, painting 900 m^{2} of surface.

== Location ==
Florida 135 is located on Camino Sotet, no. 2, in front of the Cinca River, on the eastern bank. To get there from the A-2 you can take exit 436 or exit 439. Both lead to the N-2 , which you must continue until you reach the river and then take Reyes Católicos avenue, which leads directly into Camino Sotet.

== See also ==
- Berghain
- Amnesia Ibiza
- Monegros Desert Festival
