= Así me gusta a mí =

Single by Chimo Bayo
- Language: Spanish, non-lexical vocables
- Released: 24 June 1991
- Studio: Rager Studio
- Genre: Mákina
- Songwriter: Germán Bou
- Lyricists: Chimo Bayo, Charo Campillos
- Producer: Germán Bou

"Así me gusta a mí" (transl. 'That's the Way I Like It') is a song recorded by Chimo Bayo. Recorded in Rager Studio, the single was released on 24 June 1991. The song, which became a generational icon of the so-called "Ruta del Bakalao" in Spain, also earned Bayo international fame, reaching number one in Israel and Japan. Sales surpassed 1 million in more than 40 countries. In addition to the Spanish-language lyrics, featuring a play on words on ecstasy, non-lexical vocables such as "¡Hoo! ¡Hoo ha! ¡Hea hoo! Chiquitan chiquitan tan tan…" are uttered throughout the song. It was produced by Germán Bou.

Chimo Bayo eventually released a wine label named "Hu-Há" ('Hoo Ha'), after the non-lexical vocable.
