= Ruta del Bakalao =

Spanish electronic music youth phenomenon (c. 1982–1996)

- Part of Spanish Post-Transition Culture
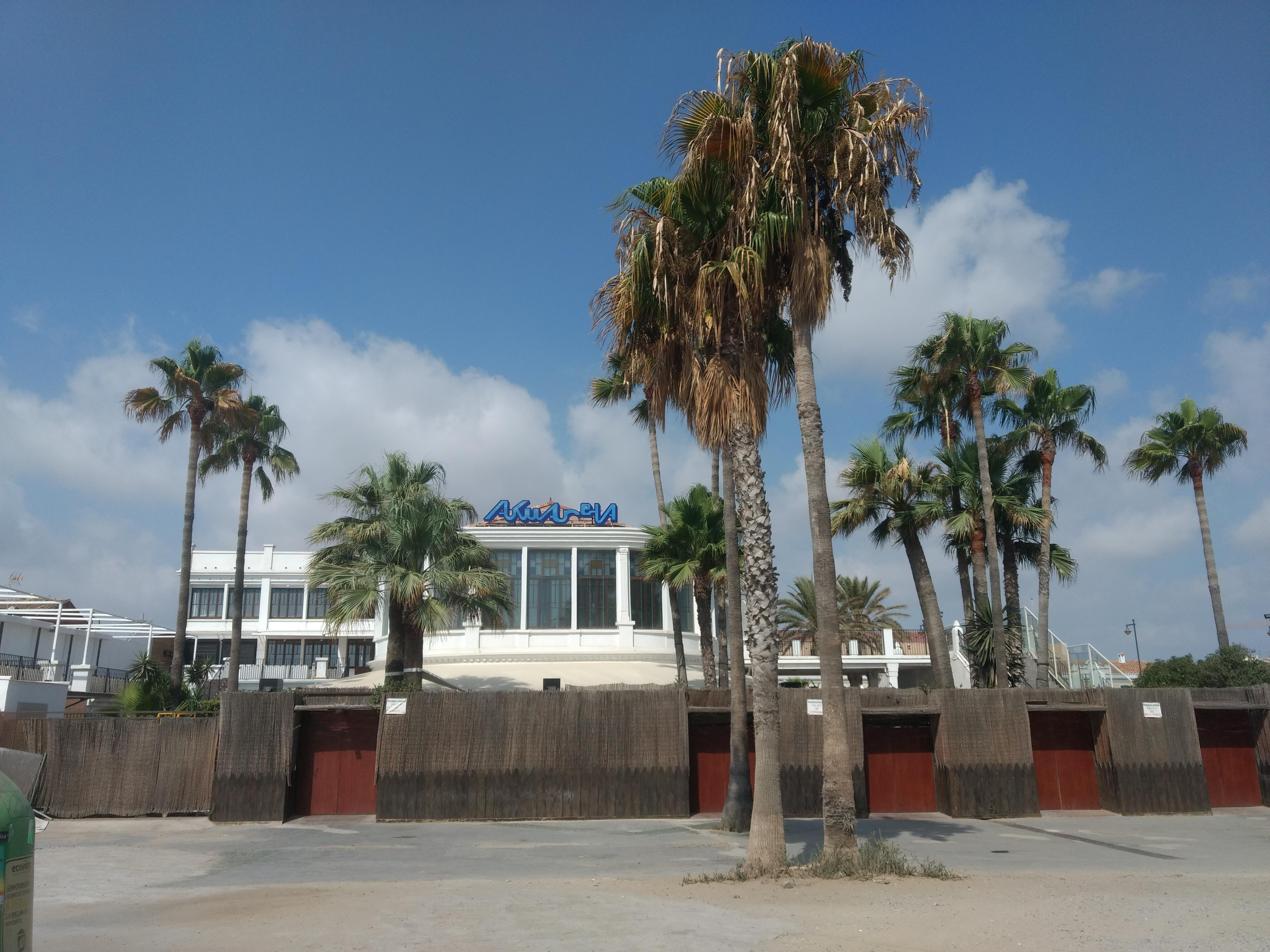
- Akuarela nightclub (formerly ACTV) in Playa de la Malvarrosa, Valencia.
- Date: c. 1982 – 1996
- Location: Valencian Community, Spain (primarily CV-500 highway)
- Participants: Clubbers, DJs, Valencian youth, international electronic musicians
- Outcome: Modernization of Spanish nightlife; introduction of Techno and EBM to Spain; development of after-hours culture.

The Ruta del Bakalao (Spanish: [ˈruta ðel bakaˈlao]; lit. 'route of the cod'), also known as Ruta Destroy or La Ruta, was a massive socio-cultural and musical movement centered in the Valencian Community between the early 1980s and mid-1990s. It was the first large-scale clubbing phenomenon in Spain, involving a 30-kilometer circuit of discotheques along the CV-500 highway (El Saler road) that operated continuously from Friday to Monday.

== Etymology ==
The term "Bakalao" (lit. 'cod') originated in 1983 at Zic Zac, the first record store in Spain specialized for professional DJs. Customers used the word as slang to refer to high-quality imported electronic music (specifically hard techno and trance from Germany and the UK). The alternative name, "Ruta Destroy," was coined by Vicente Pizcueta, director of the Barraca nightclub, though he publicly referred to it as the "Valencian Festival" for commercial branding.

== History ==
=== Origins (1982–1985) ===
The movement emerged during the legislative vacuum following the end of Francoist Spain. In 1982, the opening of Chocolate near the established club Barraca created a "shuttle" effect where patrons moved between venues, establishing the concept of a "route." Early programming featured Post-punk, New Wave, and "guitar music" from artists like The Cure, Depeche Mode, and The Smiths.

=== Golden age and innovation (1986–1991) ===
The movement transitioned toward harder electronic sounds such as EBM and Techno. DJs like Fran Lenaers (Spook Factory) and Carlos Simó (Barraca) imported vinyl records from London and Berlin that were unavailable elsewhere in Spain, promoting a unique "Valencian sound." By 1991, the phenomenon reached national prominence when Chimo Bayo's single "Así me gusta a mí" sold one million copies across 40 countries.

=== Decline and suppression (1992–1996) ===
The movement's peak coincided with the "Spain 92" era (Barcelona Olympics and Seville Expo). While the rest of the country focused on institutional modernization, the Ruta was increasingly viewed as marginal and dangerous.

Following the Alcàsser Girls crime and subsequent media sensationalism regarding "designer drugs," the Spanish government launched "Operation Bakalao" in late 1993. This involved over 100 Guardia Civil officers conducting massive checkpoints, body searches, and helicopter surveillance along the CV-500. Increased police pressure and the commercialization of the sound into high-BPM "Mákina" led to the closure of major venues by 1996.

== Notable venues ==
The circuit was concentrated within a 30-kilometer radius, allowing patrons to transit between venues during extended operating hours. The primary clubs involved in the movement included:

- Barraca (nightclub): Established in 1965 in a traditional Valencian farmhouse, it transitioned to alternative programming in the early 1980s under resident DJ Carlos Simó. It was the first venue in the circuit to prioritize imported European independent rock and synth-pop.
- Chocolate (nightclub): Housed in a former rice mill near Barraca, it opened in 1982. The venue was associated with a darker aesthetic and specialized in gothic rock and industrial music.
- Spook Factory: Opened in 1984 in a former toy factory. It became a center for technical innovation in mixing, particularly through resident DJ Fran Lenaers, who integrated beatmatching techniques with non-dance genres such as EBM.
- ACTV (nightclub): Located on the Malvarrosa beach in Valencia. It is noted for its minimalist graphic identity and for hosting sessions that extended into Monday mornings during the movement's later stages.
- Puzzle (nightclub): Noted for a programming shift toward melodic electronic sounds and European synth-pop, contrasting with the industrial and "harder" sounds prevalent in other venues of the circuit.

== Cultural legacy ==
The Ruta del Bakalao is credited with inventing the after-hours concept and the parking lot rave culture in Spain. It is now studied as a significant avant-garde movement in Spanish graphic design and electronic musicology.

=== Graphic design ===
The movement developed a distinct graphic design aesthetic that integrated the local tradition of Valencian comics and illustration with international modernist influences. Research conducted by the Institut Valencià d'Art Modern (IVAM) identifies a technical evolution that began with hand-drawn posters and flyers, later incorporating the aesthetic of European musical modernity mid-decade. By the movement's final stages, the adoption of digital design techniques standardized the imagery for mass-produced merchandising and large-scale promotion.

The artistic value of this work was formalized in 2022 during the 2022 World Design Capital in Valencia, when the IVAM hosted the exhibition Ruta Gràfica. El disseny del so de València. The project unified the narrative of this graphic evolution through interviews with artists, printers, and cultural managers, specifically highlighting the transition from traditional illustration to digital media.

In 2022, the Institut Valencià d'Art Modern (IVAM) held a major exhibition on the movement's graphic identity.

=== In popular culture ===
In 2022, Atresplayer Premium released the original series La Ruta (internationally known as The Route). The series received significant critical acclaim, winning three Premios Feroz including Best Drama Series. Created by Borja Soler and Roberto Martín Maiztegui, the show was noted for its unconventional reverse-chronological structure, starting in the decadence of 1993 and ending with the characters' youth in 1981 to highlight the "loss of innocence" within the scene.

== See also ==
- Chimo Bayo
- La Movida Madrileña
- Mákina
- The Route (TV series)
- Electronic body music
- Second Summer of Love
- New beat
