= EX-3 =

Spanish mákina music group

- Origin: Barcelona, Spain
- Genres: Mákina
- Years active: 1995–2005
- Labels: Boy Records
- Past members: David Amo; Julio Navas; Alex Castellano

EX-3 was a Spanish mákina group composed of David Amo, Alex Castellano, and Julio Navas. They are known for being one of the most representative groups of the 90's Spanish "Mákina" phenomenon, at the time when this genre crossed over from dance clubs to the pop music arena. Popular songs by EX-3 include "Ex-P-Cial", "Extres", and "Extres-A-2".

== Musical career ==
The group experienced success throughout Spain from 1995 to 1997, when many of their singles reached the top 10 on the Spanish Singles Chart.

== Discography ==
=== Singles ===
Year	Single	Peak positions	Album
Year	Single	ESP	Album
1995	"Extres"	1	Singles only
1995	"Ex-P-Cial"	1	Singles only
1996	"Extres-A-2"	2	Singles only
1997	"Extres" (Remixes)	3	Singles only
1998	"Back to Roots" (with Analogic)	—	Singles only
1998	"Into Your Mind"	—	Singles only
1999	"Extr3s E.P."	—	Singles only
2000	"Plural EP Part 1"	—	Singles only
2001	"Plural EP Part 2"	—	Singles only
2002	"Activa-T"	—	Singles only
2003	"To the Sky"	—	Singles only
2003	"Papipapapipa"	—	Singles only
2005	"First Kontakt"	—	Singles only
"—" denotes releases that did not chart
