= The New Monkey =

Former nightclub in Sunderland, England

The New Monkey was a nightclub in Sunderland, England, open between 1999 and 2006. The club received nationwide notoriety, especially in the North East of England and Scotland, becoming synonymous with Makina, a fast-paced hard style of techno music with live vocals unique to the region (known as MCing).

Following long-standing disputes with local residents due to drug use and antisocial behavior, the club was eventually closed down following a police raid leading to prosecution of the club owners.

== History ==
The original nightclub, The Blue Monkey, was located on Bedford Street and operated as a popular music venue throughout the 1990s until it was destroyed in a fire.

In 1999, efforts began to convert the former Plazo Bingo Hall New in Pallion and reopen the club under the name ‘The New Monkey’. When local residents objected to these plans, applications were re-submitted for a private members dance club without an alcohol license, thereby circumventing control by the local authority.

From 2002 to 2004, five E.P.'s were produced under the club's brand. Entitled "The New Monkey E.P.", each volume featured original Makina tracks with vocals from the club's resident MC's.

Despite petitions and complaints from local residents, and a fatal drug overdose, the club remained open and held regular events attracting attendees from across the North East. In 2006, over 100 police officers raided the club, and made 14 arrests; searches were simultaneously conducted at the homes of senior management. A High Court order mandated the closure of the club, and club bosses were charged for allowing drugs to be sold and taken on the premises receiving 12-month custodial sentences.

== Legacy ==
Despite being closed for nearly two decades, the club enjoys a longstanding cultural legacy as the epicenter of Makina music in the North East and the last of the ‘All Night Rave Scene’ in the United Kingdom. In 2019, The New Monkey became the subject of the documentary ‘The Two Monkeys’, produced by local filmmakers Rob Kilburn, Lewis Dodds and George Christaki. The documentary contains archive footage of the club, interviews with attendees, promoters, and police, and focuses on the controversy and cultural legacy the venue. At the start of 2020, plans were confirmed for a huge New Monkey reunion for May of that year before Covid came along and scuppered those, as pubs, bars and clubs were forced to close down for months on end.

Live recordings of music from the venue remain available online via music streaming services such as Spotify, Mixcloud, and SoundCloud.
