= Fraga =

- Municipality
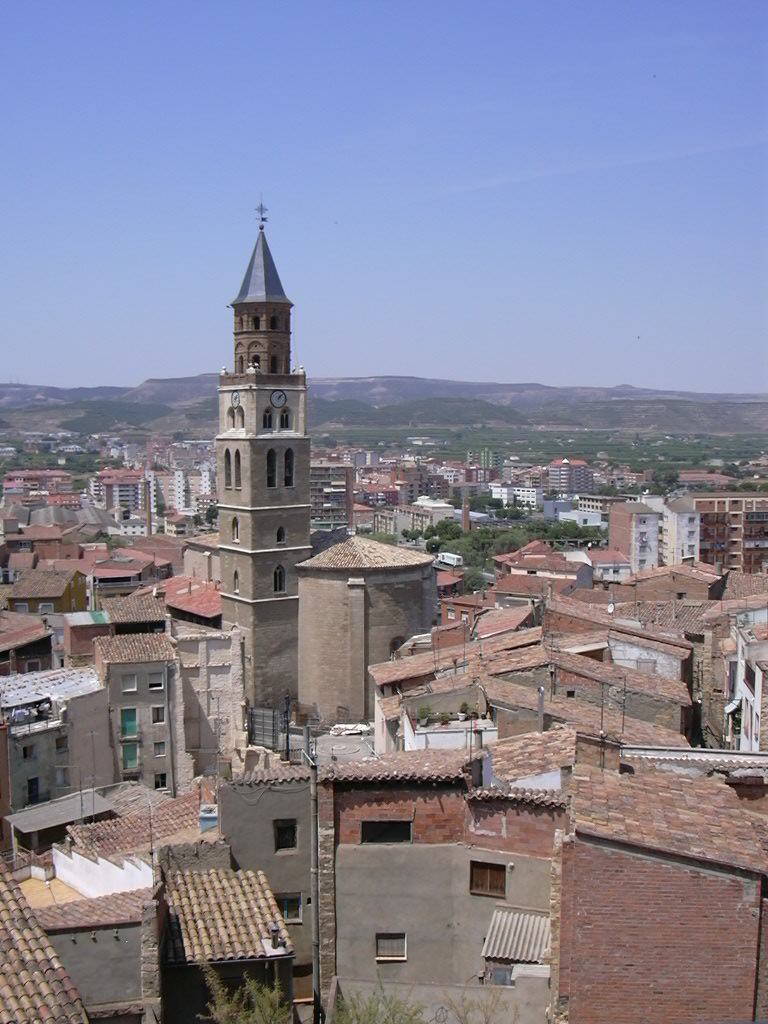

- Flag Coat of arms

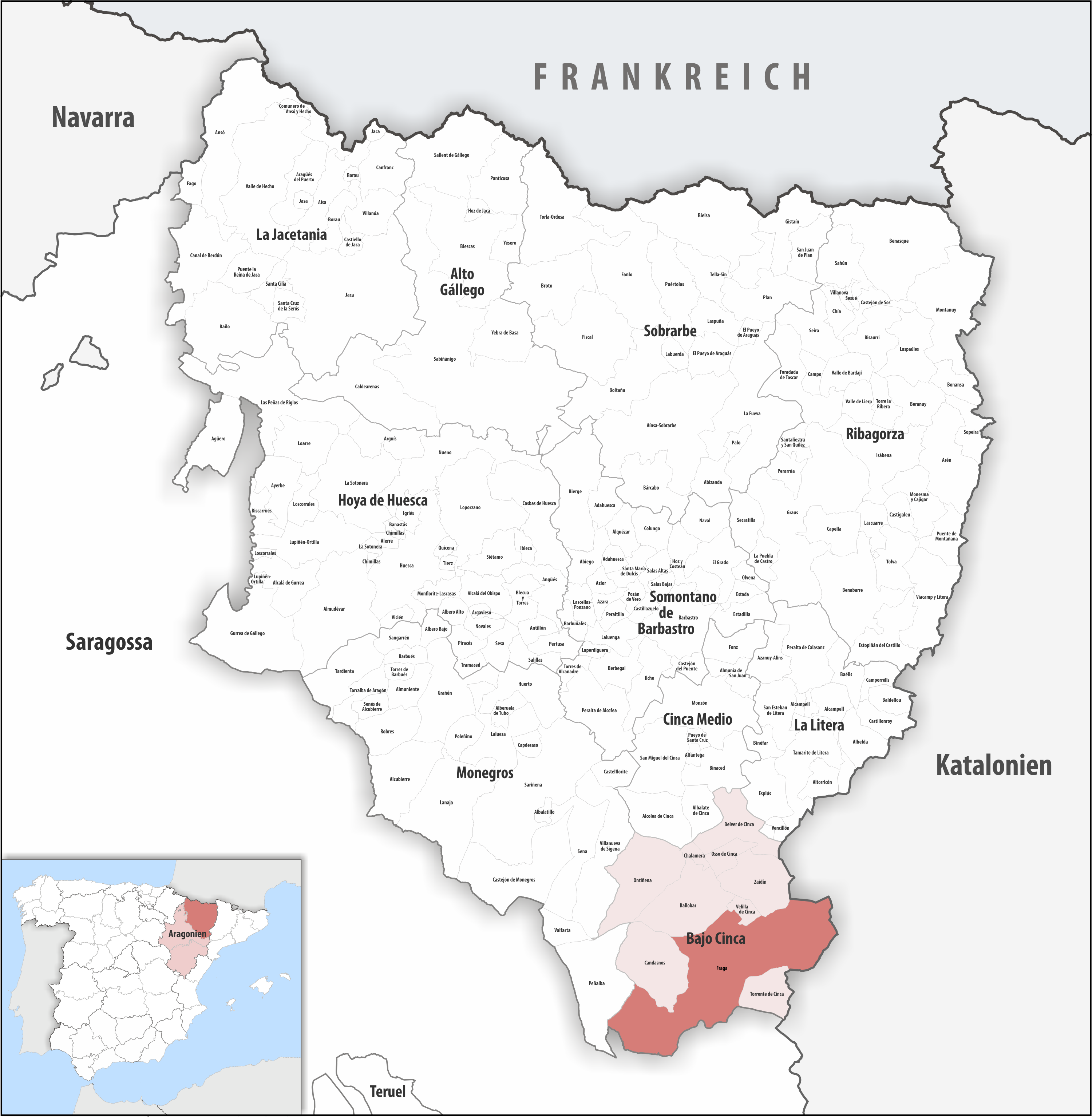
- Location of Fraga in Huesca Province

- Location of Fraga within Aragon Location of Fraga within Spain
- Coordinates: 41°31′12″N 0°21′0″E
- Country: Spain
- Autonomous community: Aragón
- Province: Huesca
- Comarca: Bajo Cinca
- Judicial district: Fraga

Government
  - Alcalde: Santiago Burgos Sorolla (2022) (PP)

Area
  - Total: 437.64 km^{2} (168.97 sq mi)
- Elevation: 118 m (387 ft)

Population (2025-01-01)
  - Total: 15,576
  - Density: 35.591/km^{2} (92.180/sq mi)
- Demonyms: Fragatino, -na Fraguense
- Time zone: UTC+1 (CET)
  - Summer (DST): UTC+2 (CEST)
- Postal code: 22520
- Website: Official website

Fraga (Spanish: [ˈfɾaɣa]; Catalan: [ˈfɾaɣɛ]) is the main town of the comarca of Bajo Cinca (Catalan: Baix Cinca) in the province of Huesca, Aragon, Spain. It is located by the river Cinca. According to the 2014 census, the municipality has a population of 14,926.

King Alfonso I of Aragon died at its walls in 1134 while trying to capture it during the Battle of Fraga. It was eventually taken from the Moors by the Count Ramon Berenguer IV of Barcelona in 1149.

The local language, called Fragatí, is western Catalan. The city was known in Arabic as أفراغة (Afrāghah).

Historically, there was a Jewish community in Fraga. Jews in Fraga enjoyed civil rights under Muslim rule, which was not always the case in other historical Spanish Jewish communities. They were given autonomy, including the right to defend themselves against attacks and the right to elect their representatives. The community ceased to exist due to the expulsion of the Muslims and Jews in 1492.

== History ==
Historical pictures
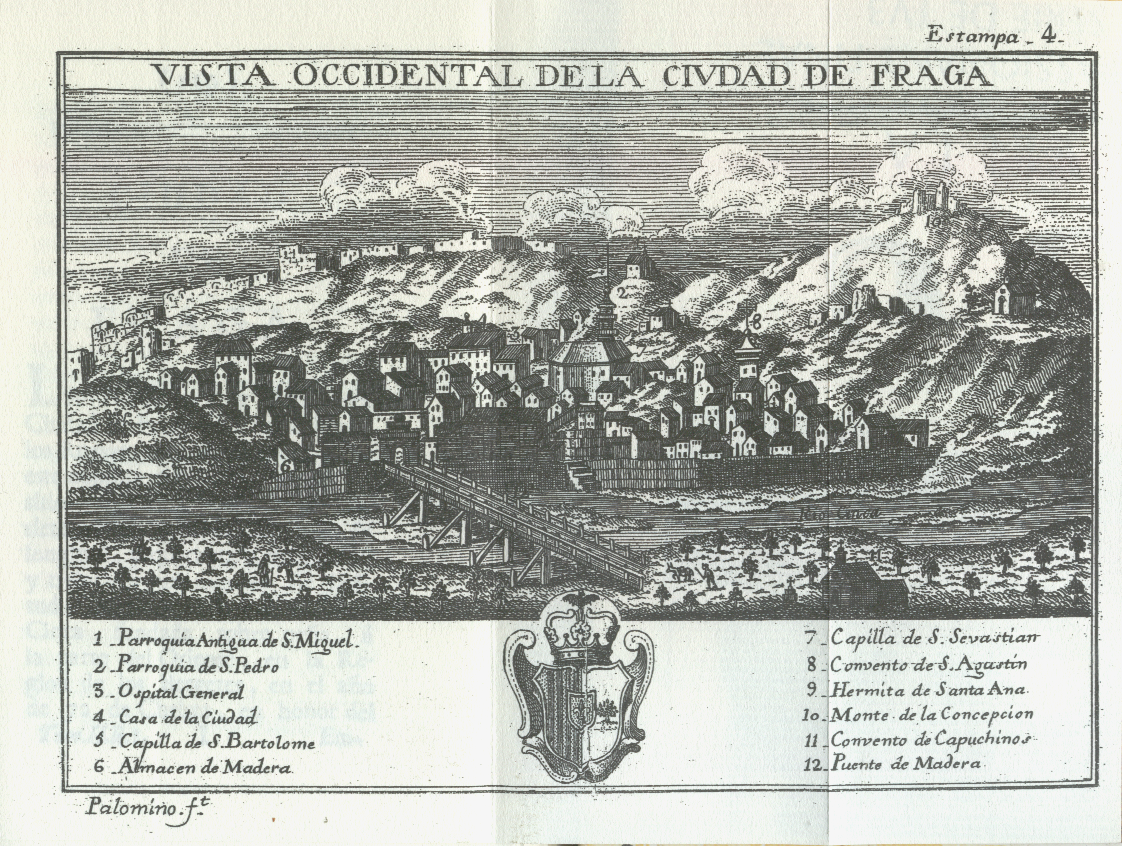
Plan of western view of Fraga circa 1779 by Bernardo Espinalt y García

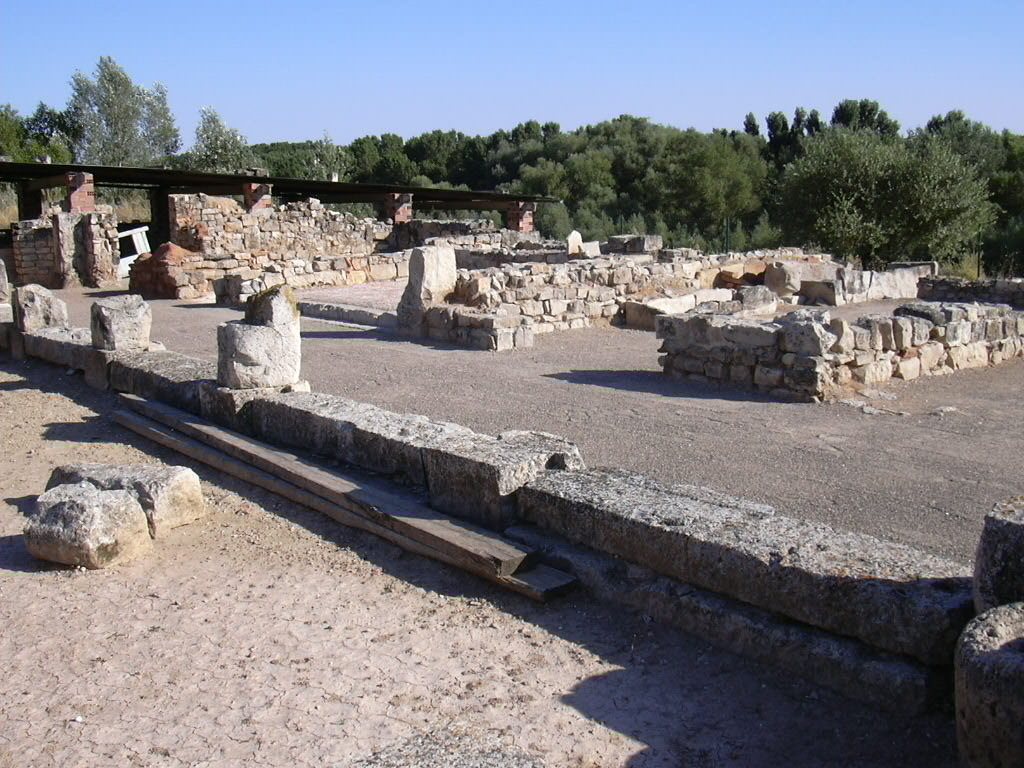

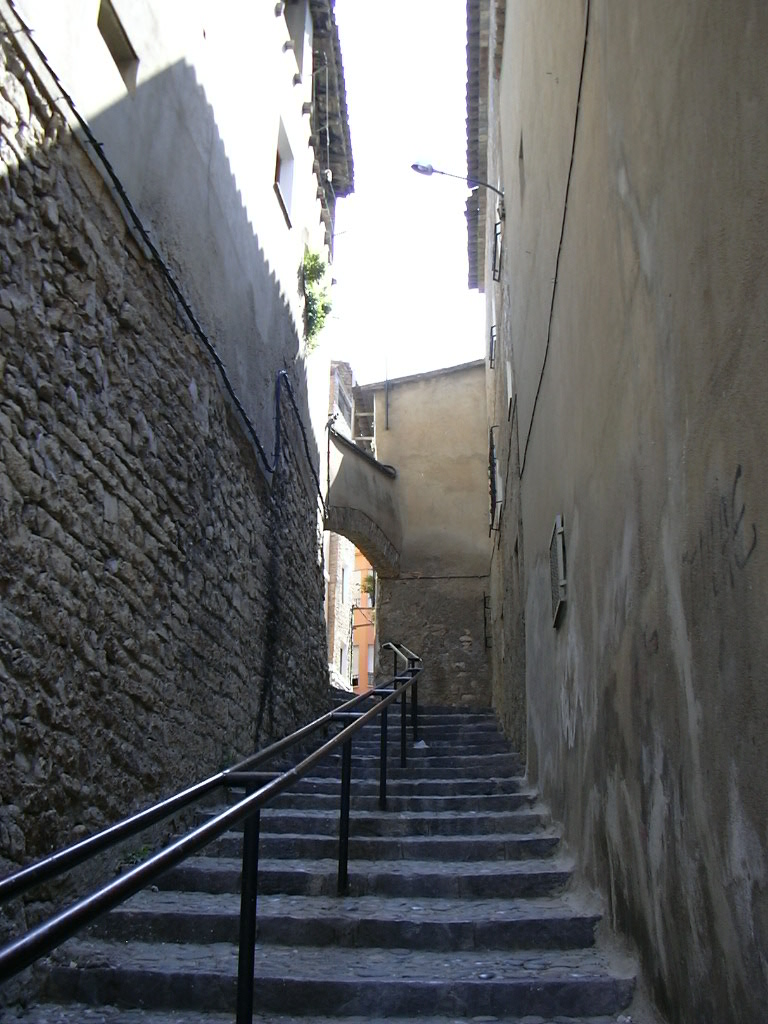
Historical pictures
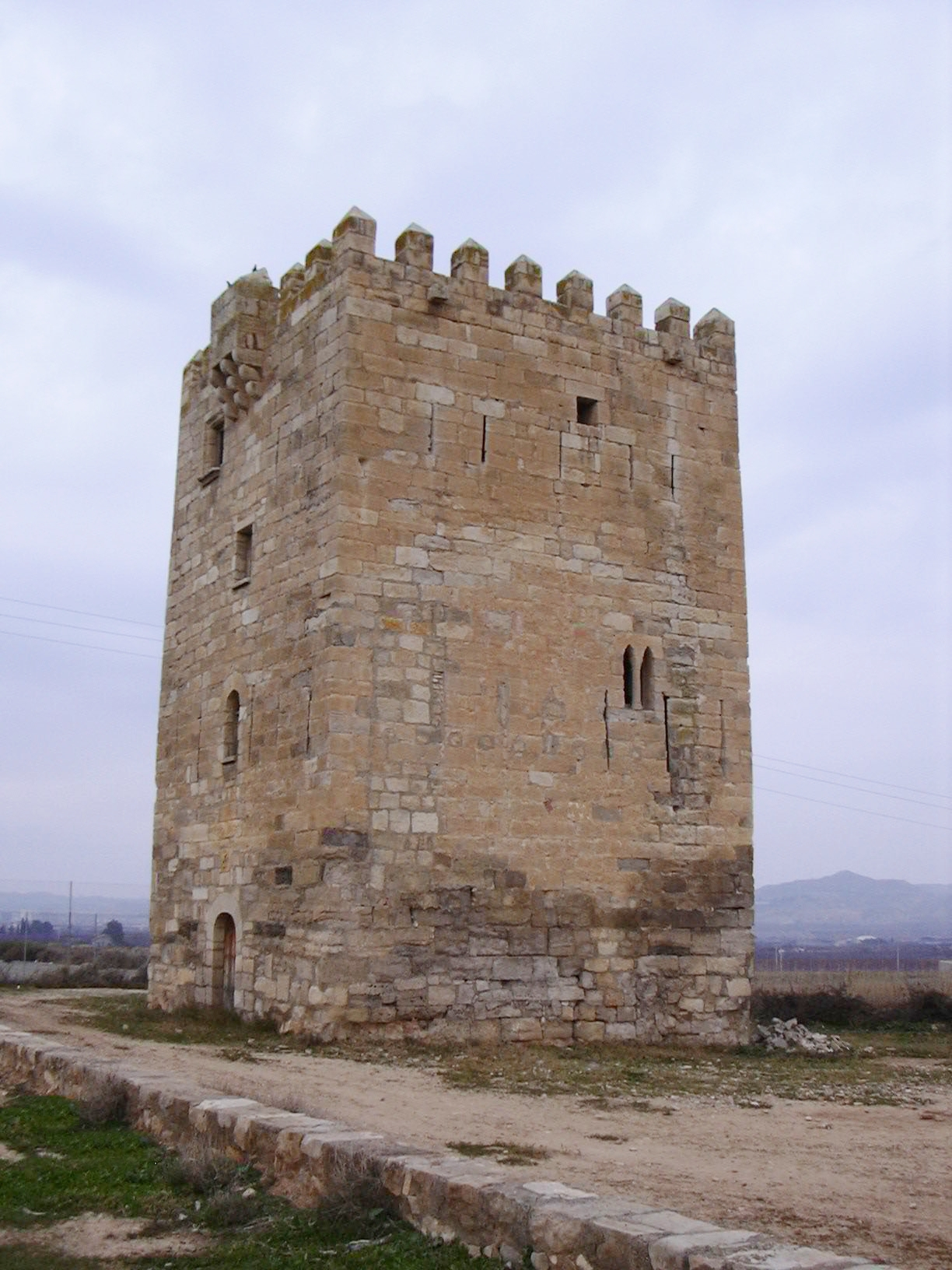

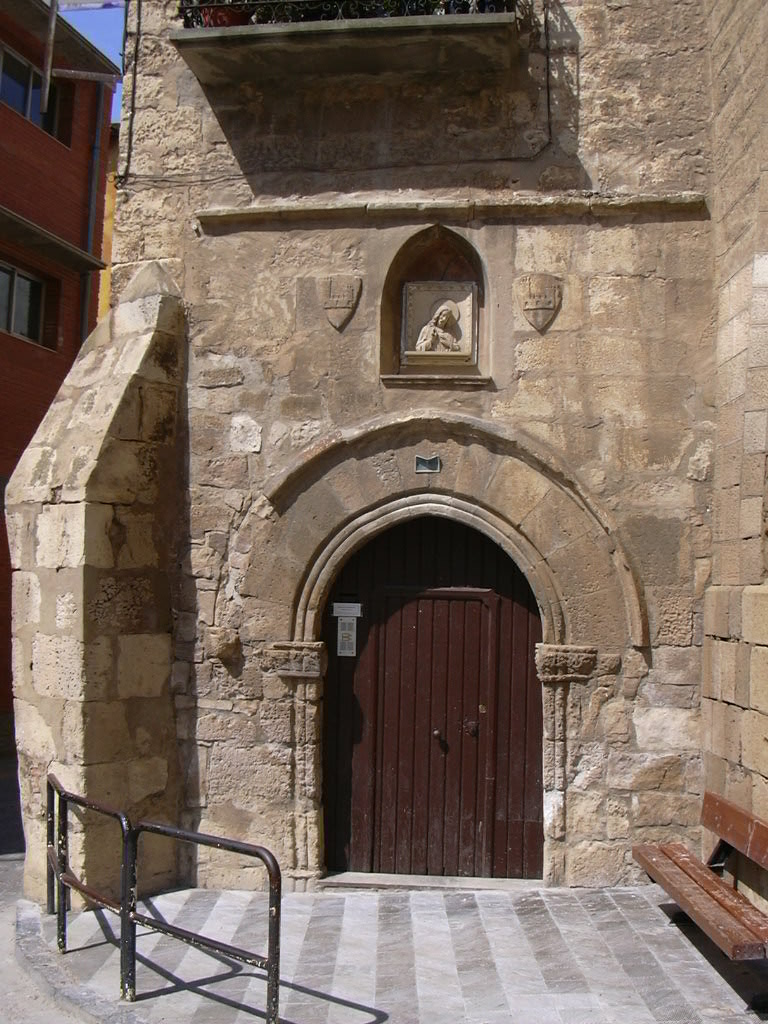

=== Sights ===
Historical pictures
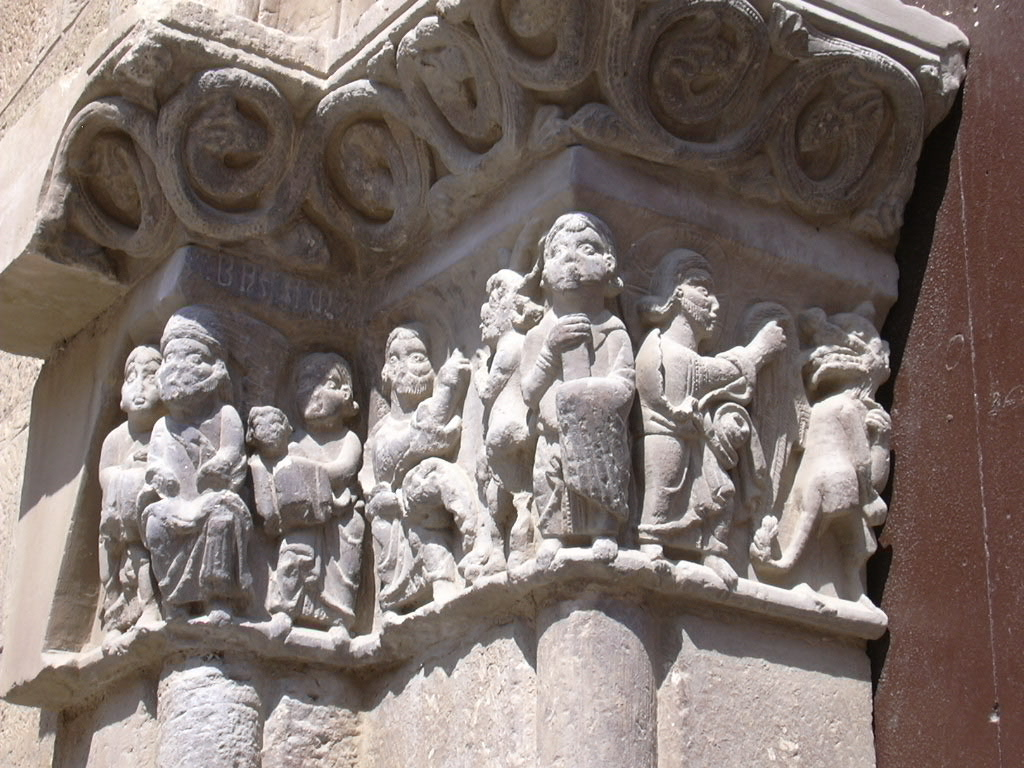

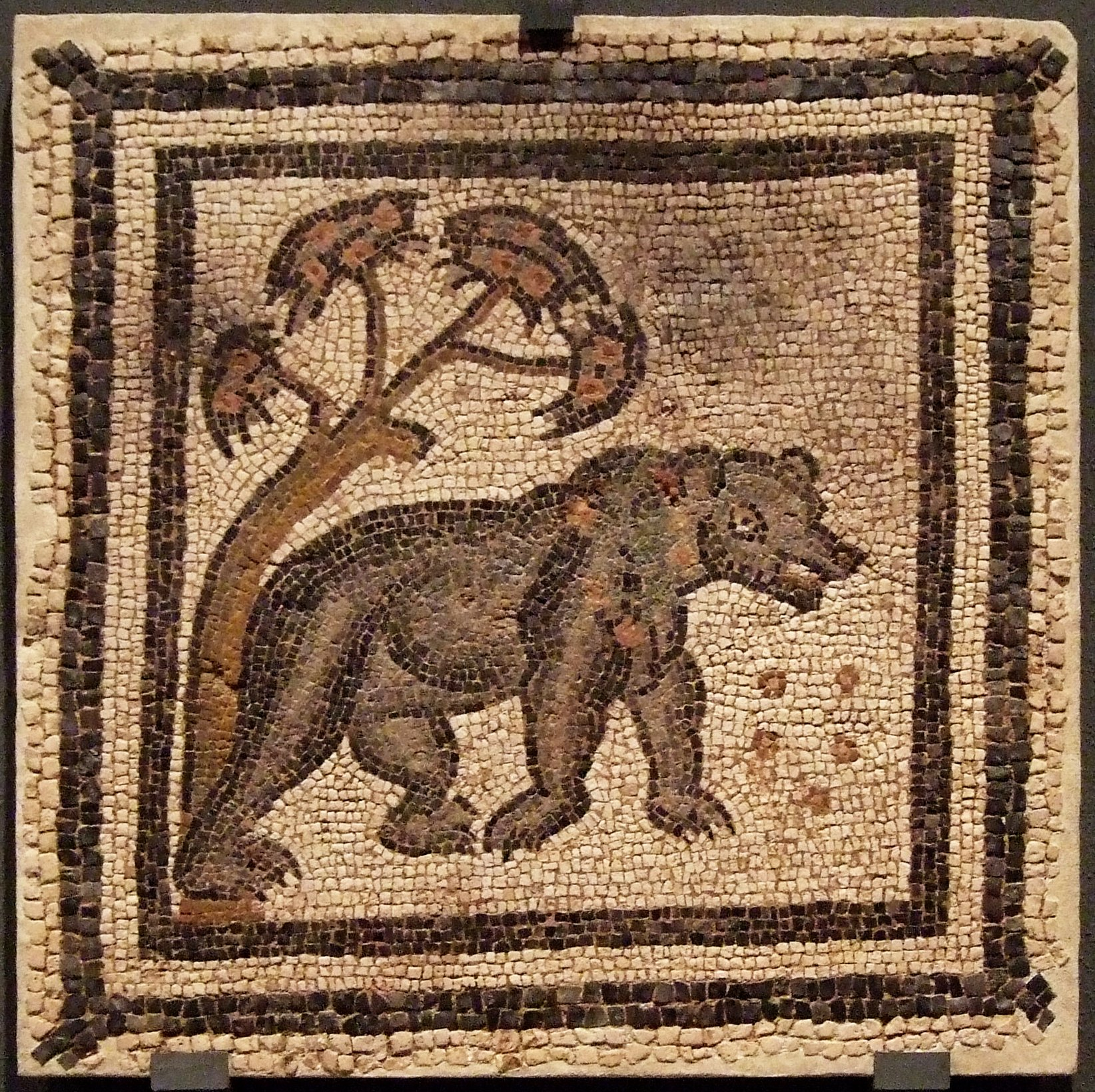
Historical pictures
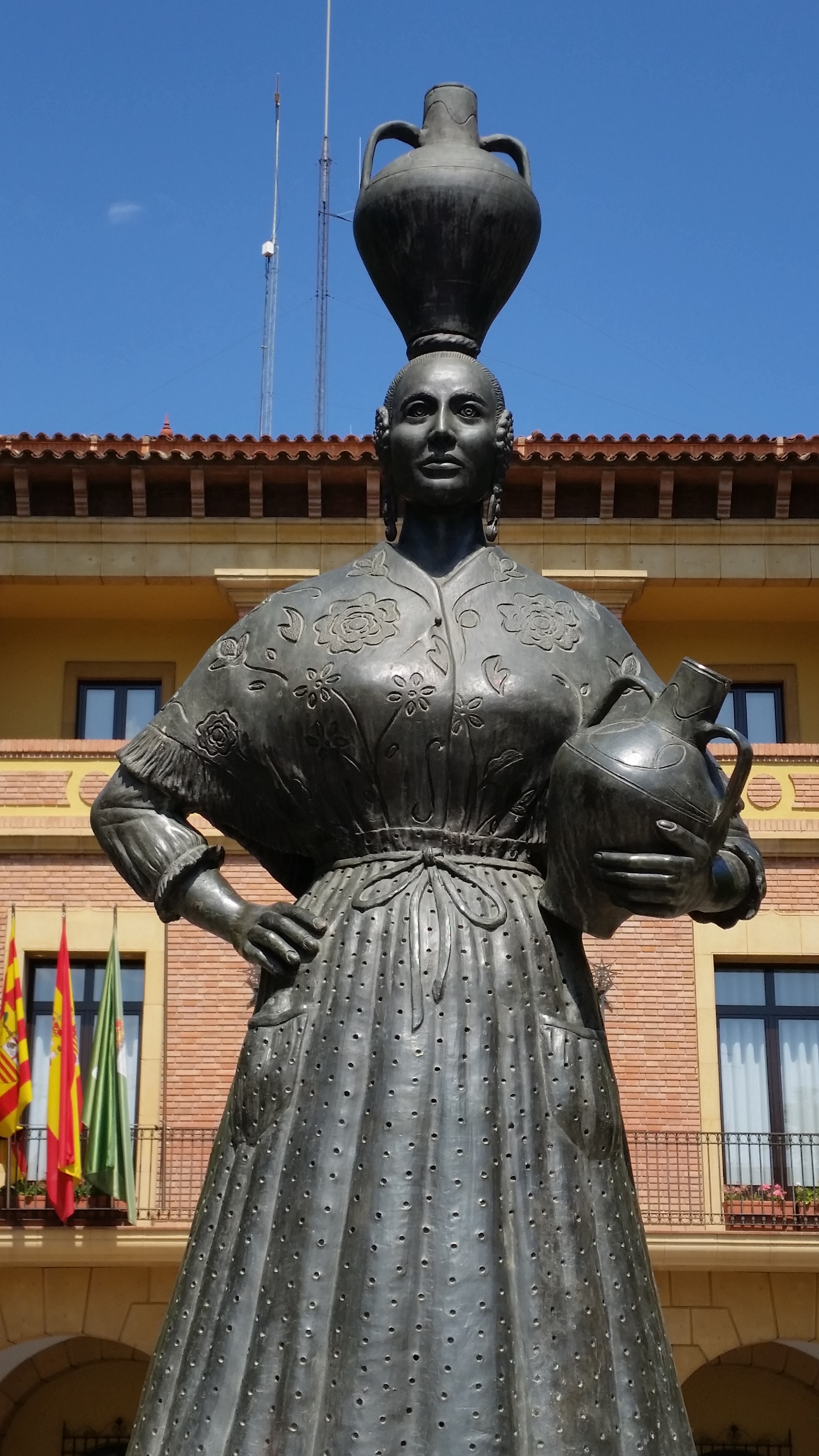

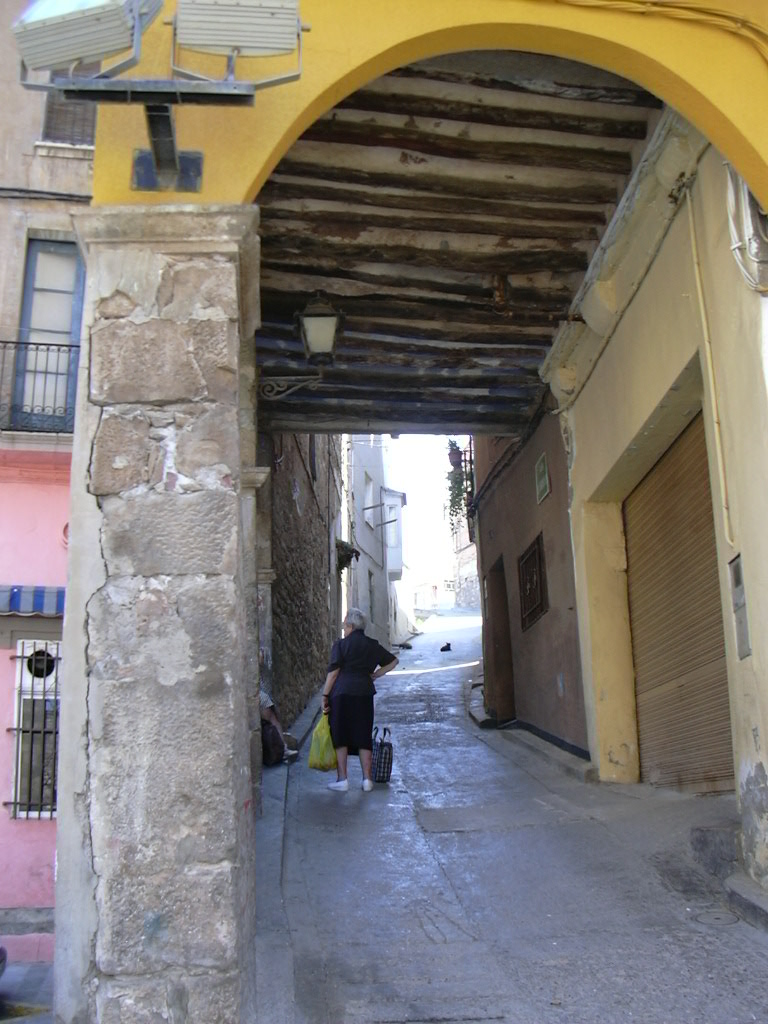

During the Spanish Civil War, the town participated in the Spanish revolution and was collectivised by the CNT.

== Demography ==
=== Population evolution along the years ===
Population trend between 1991 and 2018
1991	1996	2001	2004	2006	2013	2018
11491	11783	12100	13035	13191	14834	14979

== Notable people ==
- Astruc Remoch, prominent converso and critic of Judaism
- Ceferino Giménez Malla, Spanish Romani activist
- Lourdes Casanova, notable academic

== See also ==
- Bajo Cinca/Baix Cinca
- Grace Fraga (Actress Comedian)
- Florida 135, oldest nightclub in Spain
- List of municipalities in Huesca
