= Streamline (song) =

Single by Newton

from the album Newton - The Album (released in 2010)
- Released: 1994
- Genre: Makina
- Length: 4:59
- Label: SPG Music
- Songwriter(s): Juan Carlos Pla
- Producer(s): Newton

Newton singles chronology
"Streamline" (1994)	"Wanna Dance All Day" (1996)

"Streamline" is a song composed by Spanish makina group Newton. It was released in 1994 as a single in Spain. In 1996, it was released in France, reaching number 30 on their national chart.

In 2006, the song was featured in a Pepsi commercial featuring Jimmy Fallon, leading to some fame in the United States. The original length of the song was 5:05, but was shortened to fit the 30-second commercial. SPG Music re-released the song on July 10, 2006.

== Track listing ==
1. "Streamline (Lips version)" – 5:05
2. "Streamline (Lipspace)" – 4:37
3. "Streamline (Voice & Pianopella)" – 5:05

== Charts ==
Chart (1997)	Peak position
France (SNEP)	30
