= Migrant Clinicians Network =

Migrant Clinicians Network (MCN) is a non-profit organization dedicated to health justice and the creation of practical solutions at the intersection of vulnerability, migration, and health. It is headquartered in Austin, Texas with supporting offices in California, Maryland, and Puerto Rico. MCN engages in research, develops tools and resources, and advocates for migrants and underserved populations and the clinicians who serve them. MCN's goal is to improve health care for migrants by providing support, technical assistance, and professional development to clinicians at Federally Qualified Health Centers and other health care delivery sites, in order to ensure “quality health care that increases access and reduces disparities.” In 2019, MCN accounted for over 31,000 technical assistance encounters, 267 health center site visits, and 1,069 trained clinicians. MCN has 53 full-time and part-time staff members, with many of them being bilingual. MCN is featured as a Top Rated Non-Profit based on user reviews at Great Nonprofits as of 2021.

MCN is featured as a Top Rated Non-Profit based on user reviews at Great Nonprofits. Migrant Clinicians Network also received a platinum transparency award from GuideStar. In 2022, MCN received its largest gift yet: five million dollars from philanthropist and writer MacKenzie Scott.

== Organizational History ==
MCN was founded in 1984 by three clinicians who recognized that migrant clinicians required higher levels of support and resources directly related to the care of migrant patients. MCN now serves over 10,000 constituents, with a clinical Board of Directors, External Advisory Board, Institutional Review Board, contract workers, and a staff of 43.

=== Kugel & Zuroweste Health Justice Award ===
MCN's Kugel & Zuroweste Health Justice Award, created in 2020, is an award that acknowledges early-career clinicians who have made considerable achievements towards improving the migrant health community. The award is the creation of key MCN leadership to recognize clinicians within the first five years of their career who are generating a positive impact in the health of migrant and mobile populations. The winner receives a one-time $1,000 monetary award and must be nominated by someone other than themselves. The award was named after MCN's husband-and-wife team, and long-time staff Candace Kugel, FNP, CNM, MS, Clinical Systems and Women's Health Specialist, and Founding Medical Director Edward Zuroweste, MD. Informally known as the KZ Award, the first recipient of the award is Caroline Johnson, FNP. Johnson is a clinical director with Proteus, Inc., an Iowa-based 501©3 nonprofit advocacy agency providing training and healthcare services to farmworker populations. A formal awards ceremony was held via Zoom on December 1, 2020.

== Programs ==
=== Health Network ===
Health Network is MCN's global bridge case management and patient navigation system for mobile patients. Health Network provides continuity of care and treatment completion for mobile patients with chronic or infectious diseases by providing case management, medical record transfer, and follow-up services. Health Network has served thousands of mobile patients moving within the United States or between the United States and 114 other countries since it began in 1995. Health care providers from health centers, health departments, and other health care delivery sites enroll patients who plan to move but will need follow-up at their next location for any ongoing health condition like tuberculosis, diabetes, HIV/AIDS, cancer, or pregnancy. Health Network Associates contact the patient and then link that patient to a new health care delivery site at their next location. Health Network Associates also assure the patient's medical records are forwarded to the new location(s) and that other barriers like lack of transportation are also addressed so that the patient can continue or complete treatment. While Health Network initially centered on specific health conditions—including its TBNet program which focused on patients with tuberculosis—it now enrolls patients on the move with any health condition. In 2019, Health Network expanded its partnerships with immigration shelters at the US-Mexico border and began serving pregnant asylum seekers as well as asylum seeking children with urgent health needs.

In 2016, Migrant Clinicians Network received the 24th annual Monroe E. Trout Premier Cares Award, which includes a $100,000 cash prize, for providing comprehensive case management, medical records transfer, and follow-up services through its Health Network. On World TB Day in 2016, the Centers for Disease Control and Prevention declared Health Network a U.S. TB Elimination Champion for its work in supporting TB control. In 2010, Health Network received the Border Models of Excellence in Tuberculosis Surveillance and Control award from the U.S.- Mexico Border Health Commission.

In June, 2018, MCN started the Medical Review for Immigrants (MRI) program. Throughout the US, immigrants with critical treatment needs are held at detention centers. Through MRI, MCN pairs physicians with legal representatives to help immigrants petition for release so that they can receive the care they need. Health Network is a central component of MRI, linking the immigrant with emergency care and follow-up care after Humanitarian Parole has been granted.

=== Environmental and Occupational Health ===
MCN spearheads a number of projects aimed at addressing environmental justice and work-related health conditions. MCN's Worker Health and Safety and Environmental Justice programs offer clinicians training, tools, and resources to better recognize, manage and prevent environmental and occupational health conditions, including injuries, illness, and chemical exposure. MCN has a long history of working to improve pesticide safety. MCN's efforts include providing continuing education to clinicians, developing clinical and patient resources, and working to strengthen pesticide regulations to better protect farmworkers and their families.

MCN's environmental and occupational work expands beyond farmworkers and their families. Their numerous programs have addressed the health and safety needs of immigrant workers in food processing, dairy, construction, cleaning services, restaurant work and other service industries. MCN works closely with NIOSH funded agricultural centers in NIOSH-funded centers for agricultural safety and health including the Upper Midwest Agricultural Safety and Health Center (UMASH) and the National Children's Center for Rural Agricultural Health and Safety.

During the COVID-19 pandemic, MCN worked to provide up-to-date, evidence based information and create clinical and patient educational materials for clinicians working with immigrant communities. MCN's multi-lingual, user friendly resources were designed to be easily adapted to add local content and images. A core part of MCN's work on COVID-19 was supported through their partnership with the National Resource Center for Refugees, Immigrants, and Migrants housed within the Center for Global Health and Social Responsibility at the University of Minnesota. MCN also offered ongoing education to clinicians and community health workers through a series of partnerships and advocated for improved regulations to protect workers.

MCN also works extensively to address the impacts of the climate crisis, including advocating for policies to prevent heat related illness among outdoor workers and conducting train-the-trainer workshops for community health workers to train workers about their rights and how to protect themselves.

=== Technical Assistance and Training, and Education ===
MCN provides ongoing technical assistance to clinicians working with mobile patients. MCN uses the expertise of its staff members, its advisory boards and other professional migrant health expert colleagues, and an extensive library of technical assistance material to address clinicians' concerns as they arise. MCNs expert clinical team provides training in the form of webinars, communities of learning models, and MCNs Clinician-to-Clinician Blog.

=== Family Violence Prevention ===
MCN's Hombres Unidos Contra La Violencia Familiar engages Latino migrant men in a group setting facilitated by their peers to learn about sexual and intimate partner violence prevention. They define healthy relationships by acknowledging and addressing knowledge, attitudes, behaviors, and beliefs about intimate partnerships. Hombres Unidos received the 2013 Roth Award as an innovative project that specifically addresses the needs of underserved populations.

=== Publication ===
Streamline
- Language: English

Publication details
- History: 1995–present
- Publisher: Migrant Clinicians Network (United States)
- Frequency: Quarterly

Standard abbreviations
- ISO 4: Streamline

Links
- Journal homepage

MCN's quarterly clinical publication, Streamline, provides articles, information, and resources to frontline clinicians working with mobile underserved populations. MCN's senior staff contributes to the national conversation about migration health through regular publication in peer-reviewed journals. MCN regularly publishes op-eds and other articles to promote national dialogue on the needs of mobile and underserved populations. Recent op-eds written by MCN staff include pieces on climate change, workers' rights in regard to health, tuberculosis, pesticides, health care access for immigrants, and occupational health for migrant workers.

=== Emergency Management ===
MCN calls for clinicians to have emergency preparedness, response, and recovery plans for all populations but especially for vulnerable populations such as immigrants, migrants, and refugees who confront additional barriers in times of emergencies and their aftermath. MCN offers access to emergency preparedness best practice resources through their website. MCN also offers assistance in creating emergency preparedness, response, and recovery plans which are focused on migrant and vulnerable populations.

Funding from the Bristol-Myers Squibb Foundation has supported MCN to support community health centers in Puerto Rico and the communities they serve in the development of community emergency preparedness plans to improve health outcomes before, during and after a disaster. MCN helps these communities adjust their emergency preparedness plans using the ‘community mobilization model’ to include measures that recognize the unique needs of vulnerable populations.

Community mobilization models encourage communities to create emergency plans that meet the needs of each household in that community, including the most vulnerable, rather than simply the majority. These emergency plans create channels of communication that address the specific capabilities and needs of community members during times of crisis.

=== Witness to Witness ===
The Witness to Witness (W2W) program offers support to workers who have both high stress jobs and may have clients who are highly stressed. W2W is endorsed and associated with the American Family Therapy Academy (AFTA). Supported by MCN, the program's mission is “to build individual and organizational resilience for those working with vulnerable populations.” The program offers “interactive webinars” and “peer support groups” and at times offers one-on-one meetings with participants.

=== Ventanilla de Salud Collaboration ===
Migrant Clinicians Network is the fiscal agent for three Ventanillas de Salud in Texas within the Mexican Consulates in Austin, Del Rio and Eagle Pass. The Ventanilla de Salud Program is a program of the Mexican government through its Institute for Mexicans Abroad division. The Ventanillas de Salud exist to help Mexican nationals living in the United States gain access to health care services and receive health promotion information. The purpose of the VdS program is to provide culturally appropriate assistance and outreach at Mexican Consulates to low-income Mexican immigrant families unfamiliar with the US health system. They provide information on enrollment into health insurance plans, provide information on accessing local health services, and facilitate health access through community health fairs and vaccination events.

=== Institutional Review Board ===
In 1999 MCN started the MCN Institutional Review Board (IRB). The MCN IRB is composed of volunteers from both academic and non-academic backgrounds. The IRB is open to both MCN's ongoing research projects as well as outside research. While normal IRBs review research involving human subjects, MCN's IRB welcomes research that involves "the health status of vulnerable and medically underserved populations" and is specialized in reviewing projects that involve "a culturally and linguistically diverse study population, emerging research issues and new researchers."
