= Chimo Bayo =

Spanish dance artist

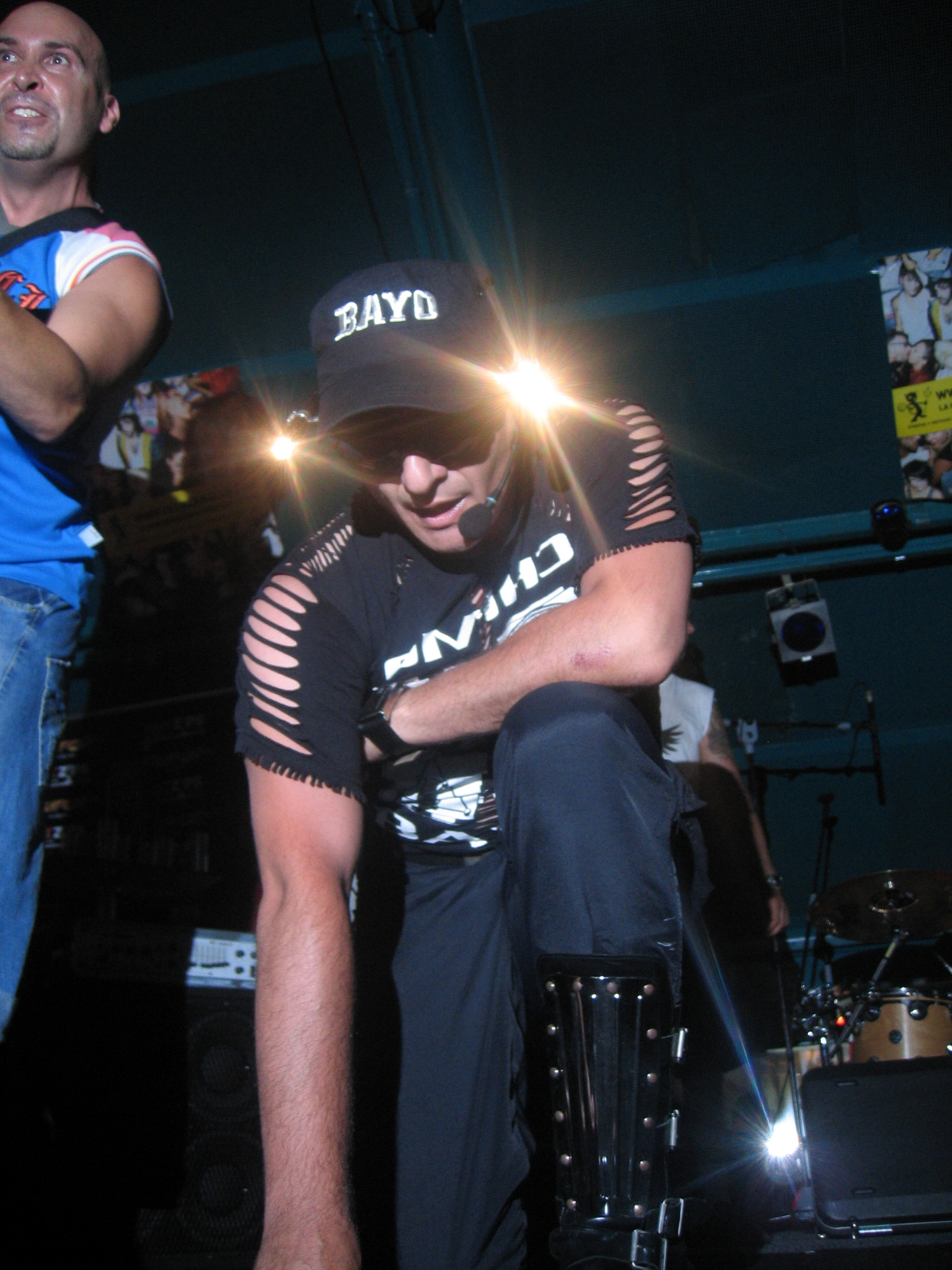
- Chimo Bayo performing in 2008

Background information
- Born: Joaquín Isidro Bayo Gómez; 25 October 1961 (age 64); Valencia, Spain
- Genres: Electronic, eurodance
- Occupations: Musician, DJ, record producer
- Years active: 1987 – Present
- Label: Area International
- Website: http://www.chimobayo.com/

Joaquín Isidro "Chimo" Bayo Gómez (born 25 October 1961) is a Spanish music artist who gained prominence in the early 1990s with "Así me gusta a mí". The song was a major hit in Spain, Greece and South America as well as reaching number one in Japan, Israel and elsewhere.

== Musical career ==
Chimo Bayo hails from Valencia, Spain. He was attempting to represent Spain in the 2010 Eurovision Song Contest with his song about the Valencia fallas, Fiesta del fuego, but was disqualified at the last minute when it was discovered the song had been heard in clubs in Valencia prior to 1 October deadline.

In 2008, Bayo appeared at Buenafuente TV Show, at LaSexta, where he gave a performance and was interviewed. Later, he composed, with the invaluable participation of Berto Romero, the popular musical theme Zascatronic, a song that had a great impact on the Internet.

In March 2009, the TV show Sé lo que hicisteis... of La Sexta invited him to star in one of the best tv reports by Pilar Rubio and ride in a threefold F1, in Circuit Ricardo Tormo from Valencia. In 2009, he also participated in comedy shows. He appears in a sketch of Muchachada Nui in an episode of the tv show Socarrats of Canal Nou.

At Radiotelevisió Valenciana, Bayo was part of the jury from October 2009 to January 2010 of the talent scout show Un beso y una flor presented by Bertín Osborne. Bayo remixed a peculiar electronic version of the song which gives a name to the show, interpreted by Nino Bravo in the last broadcast. Chimo Bayo has also leave his mark on the cinema. Their themes have promoted several movies. As Bigas Lunas did with his film Jamón, jamón in 1992, the film director included the legendary "Así me gusta a mí" in the trailer and the film Yo soy la Juani.

Now, he performs a radio program called "La casa de la Tía Enriqueta" (produced by Javier Fernández) on the local radio Radio Express Valencia, although that broadcaster has a website where the program can be followed from across Europa

In 2012, in the television show Tu cara me suena broadcast on the Spanish channel Antena 3. Arturo Valls, presenter and actor, performed an imitation of him. After that Chimo regained his popularity.

In 2016, Chimo Bayo published his first novel, with the journalist Emma Zafón:"No iba a salir y me lié", they capture on the book their experiencies on Ruta Destroy in form of piece of fiction.

== Eurovision 2010 ==
In January 2010 he was candidate for Eurovision 2010 with the song La Fiesta del Fuego, he records with the band from Valencia, Code Name. His candidature, in popular vote, had an outstanding reception. Public votes took, in just four days, his song up to the top 4, with more than 40.000 votes. However, RTVE disqualified his song because it did not meet the contest rules. The theme had been listened in the pubs of Valencia before the deadline, 1 October.

== Discography (Singles) ==
=== Singles ===
Year	Single	Peak positions				Album
Year	Single	ESP	BEL (Vl)	FIN	NED	Album
1991	"Así me gusta a mí' '(X-Ta Sí, X-Ta No)'"	1	7	—	43	Singles only
1992	"Quimica"	1	—	—	—	Singles only
1992	"Neuroquimica"	—	—	—	—	Singles only
1992	"Bombas"	2	—	7	—	Singles only
1994	"La Tia Enriqueta"	3	—	18	—	Singles only
1995	"Vamos Al Espacio Exterior"	—	—	—	—	Singles only
1996	"Búscala"	—	—	—	—	Singles only
"—" denotes releases that did not chart

== See also ==
- Ruta del Bakalao

== Bibliography ==
- Rodríguez Serrano, Aarón (2013). "Apología de la pornografía en la sociedad del malestar" (PDF). El Genio Maligno. Revista de humanidades y ciencias sociales. ISSN 1988-3927.
