= Mákina =

Subgenre of hardcore techno

- Stylistic origins: Happy hardcore; bouncy techno; hard trance; Eurodance
- Cultural origins: Early 1990s, Valencia, Spain
- Typical instruments: Synthesizer; sequencer; keyboard; sampler

Other topics
- Ruta del Bakalao; Trance music

Mákina is a subgenre of techno, originating in Spain. Similar to UK hardcore, it includes elements of bouncy techno and hard trance, it also incorporates influence from Eurodance, and the tempo ranges from 150 to 180 BPM.

== History ==
=== Early 1990s: Origins ===
Dance music in Spain became prominent in 1988 with the rise of acid house. Mákina followed this trend and has its origins in the early 1990s in Valencia, Spain. Derived from another style called bakalao, the local name given to an association of electronic dance music played together with pop and rock tunes in Valencian clubs in the second half of the 1980s.

=== Mid-1990s: Breakthrough and success ===
The genre gained prominence in 1991 when Spanish producer Chimo Bayo released his single, "Así me gusta a mí". The song succeeded throughout Europe and the genre soon gained prominence. The genre became extremely popular throughout Spain from 1995 to 1997, as many mákina-oriented singles reached number one on the Spanish Singles Chart. Spanish mákina group EX-3 had two number-one singles, "Extres" and "Ex-P-Cial" in 1995 and 1996, respectively. Perhaps the most recognized mákina single in the United States is "Streamline" by Newton, which was popularized by a 2006 Pepsi television advertisement starring Jimmy Fallon.

From the late 1990s to current times, the genre is the staple of the rave scene in North East England and Scotland. Following the closures of the most prominent venues – in particular The New Monkey nightclub – its popularity has slightly faded in those areas and has been partially replaced with scouse house. Despite this, it still retains a strong cultural legacy, regularly heard blasting from coaches when Newcastle United and Sunderland AFC play away matches.

== See also ==
- Ruta del Bakalao
