= List of Kenyan actresses =

This is an alphabetical list of notable Kenyan actresses who have appeared in film, television, or stage productions.

The participation of women in the Kenyan film and television industry has grown significantly since the early days of state broadcaster KBC, evolving into leading roles in international streaming originals on platforms like Netflix and Showmax. Kenyan actresses are regularly recognized domestically by the Kalasha Awards, established by the Kenya Film Commission and internationally at events such as the Africa Magic Viewers' Choice Awards (AMVCA).

To further address gender equity and celebrate female talent in the screen media sector, platforms such as the Women in Film Awards (WIFA) Kenya and organizations like Women in Film and Television Kenya (WIFT Kenya) were established to highlight the contributions of women in front of and behind the camera.

== A ==
- Abubakar Abbas
- Aletta Bezuidenhout
- Amina Abdi Rabar
- Angel Wainaina
- Angela Ndambuki
- Anyiko Owoko
- Azziad Nasenya

== B ==
- Brenda Wairimu

== C ==
- Catherine Kamau
- Celestine Gachuhi
- Cindy Kahuha
- Corine Onyango

== D ==
- Deedan Muyira
- Diana Luvanda

== E ==
- Eve D'Souza

== F ==
- Foi Wambui

== H ==
- Hawa Essuman

== J ==
- Jackie Matubia
- Jackie Nyaminde
- Jacky Vike
- Janet Kirina
- Janet Mbugua
- Joey Muthengi

== L ==
- Lizz Njagah
- Lupita Nyong'o

== M ==
- Mama Kayai
- Mary Oyaya
- Maureen Koech
- Mbeki Mwalimu
- Melissa Kiplagat
- Mkamzee Mwatela
- Mumbi Maina
- Muthoni Gathecha

== N ==
- Nana Gichuru
- Nice Githinji
- Nini Wacera
- Nyokabi Macharia

== P ==
- Patricia Kihoro
- Pierra Makena

== R ==
- Ruth Ndulu Maingi

== S ==
- Samantha Mugatsia
- Sarah Hassan
- Serah Mwihaki
- Sheila Munyiva
- Shirleen Wangari
- Shix Kapienga
- Size 8
- Sneh Gupta
- Sue Wanjiru

== V ==
- Veronica Waceke

== W ==
- Wanade
- Wanjiku the Teacher
- Wanuri Kahiu
- Wendy Kimani

== Y ==
- Yasmin Said

== See also ==
- Cinema of Kenya
- Kenya Film Commission
- Kalasha Awards
- Africa Magic Viewers' Choice Awards
- Women in Film Awards Kenya
- Women in Film and Television Kenya
