= Charlie Karumi =

Kenyan actor (born 1991)

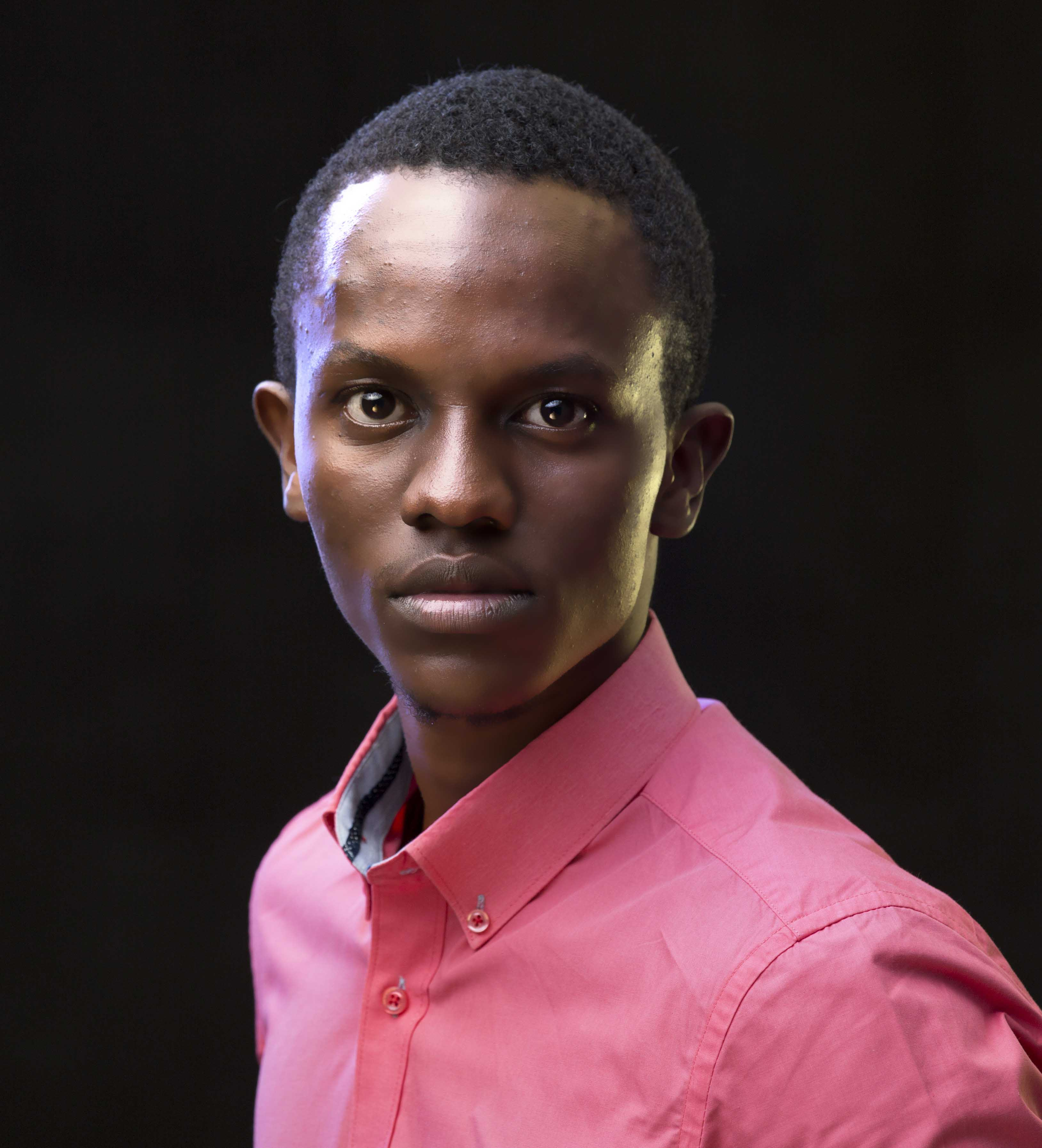
- 'Charlie' (photo by Antony Trivet)
- Born: Charles Karumi Maina; 17 August 1991 (age 34); Nairobi, Kenya
- Education: Strathmore university
- Occupations: Actor, TV presenter
- Awards: Kashala awards
- Website: charliekarumi.com

Charles Karumi Maina (born 17 August 1991), known professionally as Charlie Karumi, is a Kenyan actor and Radio (NRG Radio)/TV presenter. He has appeared in several plays, television series and films. He is best known for his role as Tony on Kenyan drama Jane and Abel and for hosting entertainment magazine show Arena 254 on K24.

Charlie was born on 17 August 1991 in Nairobi, Kenya and grew up in Uthiru. He attended Alliance high school where his love for stage was born through the school drama club.

He later joined Strathmore university for a degree in Business Information Technology and ended up kick starting his acting career. He landed his first acting role in the Kenyan TV series;Changes.

He has since featured in more films including; Lies that bind, Nairobi Half Life, Rush and Noose of Gold.

In 2015, he won the Kalasha awards for the best supporting actor for the comedy, 'Fundi-mentals'.

== Early life ==
Karumi was born on 17 August 1991 in Nairobi and grew up in the neighborhood of Uthiru on the outskirts of the city. He began his education at Genesis Primary School in Uthiru, later transferring to Visa Oshwal Primary in Westlands and finally White Cottage Primary in Gachie where he sat his Kenya Certificate of Primary Education (KCPE) exams in 2005. He then proceeded to Alliance High School in Kikuyu for his secondary education sitting for his Kenya Certificate of Secondary Education (KCSE) exams in 2008. It was while at Alliance High that he discovered his love for the stage, joining the school's drama club 'The Dramatics Society' and landing roles in 2 of the club's national award-winning plays.

In 2009, he joined Strathmore University, Nairobi, and pursued a bachelor's degree in Business Information Technology (BBIT) graduating in April 2013.

== Career ==
Karumi's professional career kicked off while in University at Strathmore. He got his first paying role on Kenyan TV series Changes.

In 2009, he joined renown Kenyan repertoire theater Phoenix Players where he trained and starred in several of the group's plays. With that training, he began his career in earnest booking roles on several Kenyan television and film productions such as Higher Learning, Lies That Bind, Nairobi Half Life, Noose of Gold and Rush.

In 2014, he starred alongside Mumbi Maina, Brian Ogola, Lizz Njagah and Sarah Hassan on Maisha Magic East Drama Jane and Abel.

In 2015, he starred alongside Gerald Langiri on comedy Fundi-Mentals, a role that saw him clinch the 2015 Kalasha Award for Best Supporting Actor.

In 2015, Karumi ventured into TV hosting, taking part in the KTN The Presenter Season 2 talent search finishing in the final 10. A year later, he successfully auditioned for and took part in TLC's Africa wide talent search, TLC's Next Great Presenter. He emerged 2nd Runners Up after a successful campaign that saw him reach the final stage of the competition.

In 2017, he hosted entertainment magazine show Arena 254 on K24 before booking a role in South Africa in upcoming Danish Broadcasting Corporation TV Series Liberty, a screen adaptation of Jakob Ejersbo's book by the same name.

in 2021, Charlie started working at Homeboyz Radio on the breakfast show with G money as his co-host after quitting NRG Radio.

=== Vlogging ===
Charlie is also a regular vlogger, sharing his vlog series titled Charlie's Day Out.

== Filmography ==
=== Films ===
Year	Film	Role	Production company
2011	Issah	Arnoldo	Mo Amin Foundation
2012	Nairobi Half Life	Phoenix Casting Director	One Fine Day Films
2013	Burnt Forest	Kibet	ZippyFilms
2015	The Friend	Troy	Kibanda Pictures
2015	Birthday Wish	Drake	Zamaradi Films
2015	Fundi-Mentals	Moses	Historia Films
2015	Just An Outside Shot	Sam	Simple Bulldog Studios
2015	#18 Pleasure Street	Greg	Spielworks Media
2016	Afya Centre	Gerald	Spielworks Media
2017	Watu Wote	Issa Ossman	Hamburg Media School
2018	Rafiki	Waireri	
2019	Lusala	Photographer	
2020	Morning After	Joe	

=== TV Series ===
Year	Show	Role	Production company
2009	Changes: Season 1	Chuma	Zebra Productions
2010	Noose of Gold	Tommy	Maxpot Media
2011	Higher Learning	Joe	Spielworks Media
2011	Lies that Bind	Mark	Spielworks Media
2013	Jane & Abel	Tony	Spielworks Media
2015	Rush	Bill	C-Through Production Ltd
2016	News Just In	Otieno	Historia Films
2017	Janjaruka	Johnnie	Flick 7 Pictures
2018	Liberty	Marcus	Danish Broadcasting Corporation
2022	Country Queen	Musyoka	
2023	Monarch: Legacy of Monsters	Dr. Udekwu	Legendary Television, Toho Co., Ltd
2024	So Help Me Todd	Jury Foreperson	
2025	Smoke TV Series	Hooded man	
2025	Invasion 2021 Series	Sergeant Amoako	

=== Awards ===
Year	Nominated work	Role	Award	Result	Ref
2015	Fundi-Mentals	Moses	Best Supporting Actor	Won	
