= List of Kenyan films =

This is an alphabetical list of films produced in Kenya.

== 0-9 ==
- 40 Sticks (2020)
- 14 Million Dreams (2003)
- 18 Hours (2017)
- 6000 km di paura (1978)

== B ==
- The Baisikol (1997)
- Balloon Safari (1975)
- Boran Herdsmen (1974)
- Boran Women (1974)

== C ==
- Chokora (2005)
- The Constant Gardener (2005)
- Click Click Bang (2022)

== D ==
- The Dance for Wives (2009)
- Dangerous Affair (2002)
- Disconnect (2018)

== F ==
- The First Grader (2010)
- Flip Flotsam (2003)
- Forest Chainsaw Massacre (2006)
- From a Whisper (2008)
- Fundi-Mentals (2014)

== G ==
- Gari Letu Manyanga (Our Hip Bus) (2007)
- Grave Yard by Cezmiq Cast (2014)
- The Great betrayal (2001)
- Game of Wits (2017)

== H ==
- Haba na Haba (2013)
- The Hammer (by Cezmiq Cast 2015)
- Hemingway, the Hunter of Death (2001)
- House of Lungula (2013)

== I ==
- I Want to Be a Pilot (2006)
- In the Shadow of Kilimanjaro (1986)
- The Invisible Workers (2013)
- Intellectual Scum (2015)
- Ivy Indo Kenyan Movie (2020)

== K ==
- Kampf um den heiligen Baum, Der (1994)
- Kibera Kid (2006)
- Kobjes: A Rock for All Seasons (1980)
- Kunyonga: Murder in Africa (1986)

== L ==
- The Letter (2019)

== M ==
- Malooned (2007)
- The Married Bachelor (1998)
- Men Against the Sun (1952)
- Mission to Rescue (2021)
- Mo & Me (2006)
- Mzima: Portrait of a Spring (1972)
- MONO (2023)

== N ==
- Nairobi Half Life (2012)
- Nangos (2009)

== O ==
- The Oath Film (2005)
- Our Strength (2012)
- Out of Africa (1980s)

== P ==
- Path of a Nomad: An Explorer's Odyssey (2003)
- Peipa
- Price of a Daughter, The (2003)
- Pumzi (2010)
- Poacher (2018)

== R ==
- Rafiki (2018)
- Rise and Fall of Idi Amin (1981)
- The Rugged Priest (2011)

== S ==
- Saïkati (1992)
- Shattered (2011)
- Shuga (2009)
- Something Necessary (2013)
- The Stigma (2007)
- Stories of Our Lives (2014)

== T ==
- Through Hell (by Cezmiq Cast 2014)
- Togetherness Supreme (2010)
- To Walk with Lions (1999) (Canadian production filmed in Kenya)
- Toto Millionaire (2007)
- Toto's Journey (2006)

== V ==
- Veve 2014
- Volume (2023)

== W ==
- The Wall Street Boy (Kipkemboi) - 2023
