= Lizz Njagah =

Kenyan actress and film director

- Born: Elizabeth Anne Achieng' Njagah; 26 December; Nairobi, Kenya
- Citizenship: Kenyan
- Occupations: Actress; director; film producer
- Years active: 1998–present
- Known for: House of Lungula; Makutano Junction
- Notable work: Fundi-Mentals
- Spouse: Alexandros Konstantaras (m. 2012)
- Children: 2
- Awards: London-Greek Festival Awards, 2013

Elizabeth Anne Achieng' Njagah (born 26 December) known as Lizz Njagah, is a Kenyan actress, film director and producer.

== Early life ==
Born and raised in Nairobi, Lizz is the seventh born among 10 siblings. Her mother died years later and her aunt took over as their guardian.

== Personal life ==
Lizz married filmmaker and director Alex Konstantaras on 10 June 2012 at the Church of St. Alexander in Greece. On 10 February 2016, the couple welcomed their first son, Georgios Apolo Konstantaras.

== Career ==
=== 1998-early and mid 2000s: Early showbiz career ===
Lizz's career began in 1998 after she joined the Kenya National Theatre. She played various plays for one year, before she was awarded a two-year internship with Phoenix Players, where she had a number of roles and also doubled up as the Membership Secretary. She also appeared in a number of TV commercials for different brands including Lux Beauty Soap, Telkom Kenya and EABL's Fungua Fanaka promotion. She toured South Africa, Mozambique and Kenya with Seok Ho Lee's Play "Sara Baartman and the Four Karma's".

=== 2006-10: Makutano Junction and venture in film industry ===
In 2007, she was cast as the lead actress in the Kenyan educative soap opera Makutano Junction as Nancy. She played with the likes of Maqbul Mohammed, Peter King Nzioka and Naomi Kamau. In 2010, she produced and played in a movie, Me, My Wife and Her Guru.

=== 2011-12: Saints, Return of Lazarus ===
In 2011, she played the protagonist in the medical drama series Saints. She got a role as a series regular in M-Net's Nigerian drama, Tinsel. She starred in the television series from its fourth season. In 2012, she was cast as the lead in Greek/Kenyan road film, The Return of Lazarus, for which she won a Best Actress award at the London Greek Film Festival for her portrayal of a Kenyan immigrant.

=== 2013-14: House of Lungula, Jane & Abel, Veve ===
In 2013, she and her husband Alex Konstantaras produced the award-winning movie House of Lungula. The movie received several awards and nominations. She played Lola Taylor, wife of Ian Mbugua's character. In 2014, she returned to television when she starred in Maisha Magic's television series, Jane and Abel. She played Jane, a loving mother and the central character of the soap opera. She also played in film, Veve. In 2015, she played leading lady in the drama-comedy How to Find a Husband. She played alongside Sarah Hassan, Mumbi Maina, Nana Gichuru and Nice Githinji.

=== 2015-present: Fundi-Mentals, Pearls of Africa ===
She also had the main role in the erotic comedy film Fundi-Mentals. She played with other notable actors like Gerald Langiri. She has also played in the film The Pearl of Africa that was released in 2016.

In 2025, she returned to the small screen as executive producer of Showmax dramedy Adam to Eve. She developed the show together with her husband, Alex, in the gender flip comedy drama that stars Blessing Lung'aho, Ellah Maina and Celestine Gachuhi.

== Filmography ==
=== Film ===
Year	Title	Role	Notes
2010	Me, My Wife And Her Guru	Angela	Nominated — Kalasha Awards for Best Lead Actress in a Film
2012	The Return of Lazarus	King'ora	
2013	House of Lungula	Lola Taylor	Also executive producer and writer
2014	Deceit	Sheila	
2014	Veve	Esther	
2015	Fundi-Mentals	Mrs. Juma	Also executive producer
2022	Bargain Bride		Directed by Alexandros Konstantaras
TBA	The Pearl of Africa	Tess	Post-Production

=== Television ===
Year	Title	Role	Notes
2007–2015	Makutano Junction	Nancy	Main role 179 episodes
2011	Noose of Gold		Featured
2011	Saints	Dr. Salma Suleiman	
2012	Tinsel	Tare Duke	3 episodes
2014	Jane & Abel	Jane	Main role
2014	Drift Beyond Conscious		Television film
2014	Live or Die	Rose	Television film
2015	How to Find a Husband	Abigail	Main role 2 episodes
2017	News Just In	Lavender	TV Series
2025	Adam to Eve	Executive Producer	TV Series

== Awards and nominations ==
Year	Association	Award	Project	Result	Ref
2013	London-Greek Festival Awards	Best Actress	Return of Lazarus	Won	
2013	Papyrus Magazine Screen Actors Awards (PAMSAA)	Best Kenyan Actress		Won	
