= Jane & Abel =

Television series

- Genre: Romance; Soap opera; Drama
- Directed by: Alan Oyugi; Aggie Nyagari
- Starring: Lizz Njagah; Brian Ogola; Mumbi Maina; Sarah Hassan; Angel Waruinge; Charlie Karumi
- Country of origin: Kenya
- Original language: English

Production
- Executive producer: Dorothy Ghettuba
- Camera setup: Multi-camera setup
- Running time: 24 minutes
- Production company: Spielswork Media Ltd

Original release
- Network: Maisha Magic East
- Release: 4 September 2015

Jane & Abel is a Kenyan television series that premiered on 4 September 2015 on Maisha Magic East. It stars Lizz Njagah and Brian Ogola. Mumbi Maina stars as the antagonist. The soap opera explores themes of lust, passion, greed, deceit, and spite.

== Premise ==
Jane Kazi, a competitive and highly independent woman owns and 24/7 Media Group. Her primary mission is to get revenge on the Simba family, headed by the eldest son and CEO of Simba Media Empire, Abel Simba. Abel strives to keep the family's market dominance. Jane is the illegitimate daughter of John Simba and stepsister to Abel. She holds a deep resentment towards the Simba family and does everything in her power to bring it down.

== Cast ==
- Lizz Njagah as Jane
- Brian Ogola as Abel Simba
- Sarah Hassan as Leah
- Mumbi Maina as Cecilia
- Angel Waruinge as Aida Simba
- Helena Waithera as Lucy
- Charlie Karumi as Tony
- Tracy Mugo
- Justin Mirichii
- David Gitika
- Kirk Fonda
- Innocent Njuguna
- Chris Kamau
- Neville Misati as Patrick
- Gerald Langiri as Lawyer Steven
- Maina wa Ndung'u

== Production ==
The soap opera is produced by Spielswork Media Ltd. Produced by Dorothy Ghettuba who is also the brain behind productions like Lies that Bind, Sumu la penzi. Directed by actor and director Alan Oyugi together with Aggie Nyagari. Filming took place in Nairobi, Kenya. The show features its ensemble cast of Kenyan renowned actress Lizz Njagah, Brian Ogolla, Mumbi Maina, Sarah Hassan and Angel Waruinge.

== Release ==
Jane and Abel made its debut on Maisha Magic channel on September 4, 2015. It airs on Wednesday to Friday at 10 pm.

== Awards and nominations ==
Year	Ceremony	Award	Recipient	Result	Ref.
2016	Africa Magic Viewers Choice Awards	Best Television Series	Dorothy Ghettuba	Nominated	
