= Veronica Waceke =

Kenyan actress

- Citizenship: Kenyan
- Occupation: Actress
- Notable work: Fundi-Mentals
- Awards: Best East African Female Actress award at the Mashariki Film Festival.

Veronica Waceke is a Kenyan actress. She first appeared in the 2015 film Fundi-Mentals. For her performance in the film My Faith, Waceke won the Best East African Female Actress award at the Mashariki Film Festival. She portrayed Lesedi in the Kenya National Theatre's production of Walter Sitati's play; Necessary Madness 2 and Deliberate Contempt in 2019. Waceke was nominated for the 2014 Africa Magic Viewers' Choice Award for the Best Actress in a television drama series 'Higher Learning'.

== Awards ==
- Best Supporting Actress – Riverwood Awards
- Best Actress – Mashariki Film Festival Awards 2015

== Select filmography ==
- Higher Learning (2010) as Aida
- The Captain of Nakara (2012) as Shop Assistant
- Strata (2013) as Silk
- Fundi-Mentals (2015)
- Tuko Macho (2016) as Nikki
- Crime and Justice (2021) as Nurse
- Country 49 (2022) as Ziza
