= How to Find a Husband =

Kenyan television series

- Genre: Romance; Soap opera
- Written by: Abigail Arunga; Benson Njuguna; Jacque Ndinda; Clifton Gachugua; Voline Ogutu; Njihia Mbitiru
- Starring: Lizz Njagah; Sarah Hassan; Mumbi Maina
- Country of origin: Kenya
- Original language: English
- No. of seasons: 1
- No. of episodes: 13

Production
- Executive producer: Erica Anyadike
- Producers: Voline Ogutu; Jacqe Ndida
- Production location: Nairobi
- Editor: Wizz Kev
- Camera setup: Single camera
- Running time: 25 minutes
- Production company: StoryLab limited

Original release
- Network: Maisha Magic
- Release: 3 March – 16 May 2015

Related
- How to Find a Husband (2006)

How to Find a Husband is a Kenyan comedy-drama television series that made its debut on 3 March 2015. It stars Lizz Njagah, Sarah Hassan and Mumbi Maina. The story mainly features romance as its primary theme.

Sally Grey, a 37-year-old TV presenter tries to find her future husband on different dates and sets out to find her Mr. Right in 10 weeks.

== Premise ==
Abigail, Carol and Jackie are three middle-class Kenyan women traversing the entrepreneurial and social scenes of Nairobi. Abigail (Lizz Njagah) is an assertive woman who owns her own business but is susceptible to insecurities from her tumultuous past, involving heartache and a search for the right man. Her cousin Jackie (Mumbi Maina) is a more liberal and experimental woman enjoying the attention of her middle-aged years and less wary of what the future holds. Carol (Sarah Hassan), on the other hand, may come across as slightly dimwitted, but it’s evident that it's a façade, enabling her to easily manipulate her way into getting what she wants.

== Cast ==
=== Regular cast ===
- Lizz Njagah as Abigail
- Mumbi Maina as Jackie
- Sarah Hassan as Carol
- Nice Githinji as Fridah
- Nana Gichuru as Sylvia
- Neville Misati as Nelson
- Lenana Kariba as Henry
- Joe Kinyua as Thomas
- Joed Ngaruiya as Robert
- Martin Githinji as David
- Irene Njuguna as Patricia
- Patricia Ndisi as Agnes
- Harry Ebale as Aubrey

== Production ==
The show is produced by Erica Anyadike, a Tanzanian producer based in Kenya. The script writers are; Abigail Arunga, Benson Njuguna, Jacque Ndinda, Clifton Gachugua, Voline Ogutu, Njihia Mbitiru and Jacque Ndinda.

== Broadcast ==
How To Find a Husband premiered in syndicate channel Maisha Magic on 3 March 2015.

== Awards and nominations ==
=== 2016 Africa Magic Viewer's choice Awards ===
Association	Award	Recipient	Result
Africa Magic Viewers Choice Awards	Best Television Series	Erica Sugo Anyadike	Pending
