= Ainea Ojiambo =

Kenyan actor (born 1970)

- Born: Ainea Ojiambo; 20 April 1970 (age 56); Nairobi, Kenya
- Occupation: Actor
- Years active: 2000–present
- Children: 2

Ainea Ojiambo (born 20 April 1970), is a Kenyan actor. He is best known for the roles in the films The Constant Gardener, Bullion and Jack Zollo: My Life in Crime.

== Personal life ==
He was born on 20 April 1970 in Nairobi, Kenya. He is a father to two children, a boy and a girl.

== Career ==
Before entering popular screen, he worked in several stage plays and that is how his acting career began. In 2004, he was invited to play in the Hollywood film The Constant Gardener directed by Fernando Meirelles. In the film, he played a minor role of a 'Police Driver'. The film was a critical and box office success and earned four Oscar nominations. Then in 2007, he acted in the Kenyan television series Makutano Junction with the role of 'snake'.

After the success of the series, he was later invited to play in two more television serials: Block-D and Noose of Gold. In the soap opera Noose of Gold, Ojiambo played the lead role of 'Ole Mpisha'. The soap was later broadcast for 3 seasons across Africa in the Africa Magic Channel. In 2010, he made his second Hollywood film The First Grader, a biographical drama film directed by Justin Chadwick. In the film, he made a supportive role as an 'Education Official'.

In the following years, he made film appearance in the films, The Rugged Priest, Fundi-Mentals, Nairobi Half Life, Following Jesus, Babuz Babies, Kibera Kid, Closed hands, Stigma, Obohoz, The Rugged Priest, Guerilla Boy, and LoveDoctor. In 2014, he appeared in Ugandan crime drama film Bullion which was nominated to the Oscars with a supportive role.

== Filmography ==
Year	Film	Role	Notes
2005	The Constant Gardener	Police Driver	Cast, TV series
2007	Makutano Junction	Snake	Cast TV series ( 11episodes)
2007	Toto Millionaire	Supa	Cast, Film
2009	Block-D	Chinedum	Cast, TV series
2010	Noose of Gold	Ole Mpisha	Cast, TV series ( 100 episodes)
2010	The First Grader	Education Official	Cast, Film
2011	The Rugged Priest	Ole Shompole	Cast, Film
2012	Nairobi Half Life	Officer Mutua	Cast, Film
2013	Sumu la Penzi	Victor	TV series
2014	Bullion	David	Cast, Film
2015	Fundi-Mentals	Doc	Cast, Film
2020	Kina	Detective Juma	Cast, TV series
2020	40 Sticks	Politician's Aide	Cast, Thriller
TBD	After the Harvest II	Wilson	Cast, Film
TBD	Kahawa Black	Steven Wamba	Cast, Film
2011 - 2012	Demigods		Cast, TV series
2011	Shattered		Cast, Film
2015	Jongo Love: The Movie	Godpapa	Cast, Film
2016	The CEO	Hakeem	Cast, Film
2017 - 2019	Jela 5 Star	Gost	Cast, TV series
2021	Teke		Cast, TV series
2022	Loop	John	Cast, short film
2022	Igiza	Musa	Cast, TV series (6 episodes)
2022	The Pit	Prison Officer #1	Cast, Film
2022	Sleep	Mr. Wafula	Cast, Film
2022	County 49	Okusimba Sibi	Cast, TV series ( 13 episodes)
2023	Daydreamers	Police Officer	Cast, Film
2024	White Widow	Wilson	Cast, Film
2024	My Samuel	Samuel	cast, Short film

== Awards and nominations ==
Year	Awarding Organisation	Category	Nominee	Result	Ref
2010	Kalasha International Film and TV Awards	Best Supporting Actor Film	Ainea Ojiambo	Nominated	
2022	Kalasha International Film and TV Awards	Best Supporting Actor in a Drama	Ainea Ojiambo	Won	

== See also ==
- My Life with a Criminal: Milly's Story
- My Life in Crime
