= Mumbi Maina =

Kenyan actress (born 1985)

Mūmbi Maina
- Born: 14 January 1985 (age 41); Nairobi, Kenya
- Occupations: Singer; Actress; production co-ordinator
- Years active: 2009–present
- Notable work: Zakia Sense8
- Awards: Kalasha awards

Mūmbi Maina (born 14 January 1985) is a Kenyan actress and dancer. She has appeared in several films since 2009 and is known for her roles in the soap opera Mali (2011–2013) and as Zakia in the Netflix science fiction series Sense8.

Maina made her acting debut in the 2009 film Unseen, Unsung, Unforgotten, earning the Kalasha Award for the Best Supporting Actress.

Her film credits include the DStv Africa Magic original films 29, Terra Firma, Being Oti, Lovers Ransom, and Runaway Groom.

== Career ==
Maina made her acting debut in the 2009 film Unseen, Unsung, Unforgotten as Riziki. She appeared alongside Benta Ochieng and Nice Githinji in a story focused on HIV/AIDS. In 2011, she was cast in the Kenyan soap opera Mali. Later that year, she appeared in the film Shattered, alongside Rita Dominic and Robert Burale. In early 2015, she portrayed Jackie in the television series How to Find a Husband, alongside Lizz Njagah and Sarah Hassan.

In 2016, Maina portrayed Jane Mabagwa in the short film Lina and Zakia in seven episodes of the second season of Sense8. Her performance led director Lana Wachowski to cast her in The Matrix Resurrections as Eliister.

In 2021, Maina starred as Aisha in Nafsi, alongside Catherine Kamau. The film was produced by Reuben Odanga of Multan Production Limited. She portrayed Thabisa in La Femme Anjola, a film about a young Nigerian investment banker, which earned her a nomination for the Africa Magic Viewers' Choice Awards in 2022. The film also starred Rita Dominic as Anjola and Nonso Bassey as Dejare.

In 2025, she starred as Vera in the Showmax Original The Chocolate Empire.

== Filmography ==
=== Film and television ===
Year	Title	Role	Notes
2008	Unseen, Unsung, Unforgotten	Riziki	
2011–2015	Mali	Nandi	Soap opera, main cast
2011	Shattered	Mumbi	
2014	Jane & Abel	Cecelia	Soap opera, main cast
2015	How to Find a Husband	Jackie	Limited-run series, main cast
2015	Runaway Groom	Leah	TV film
2016	Kati Kati	Jojo	
2016	Lina	Jane Mabagwa	Short film
2017–2018	Sense8	Zakia	Recurring role (season 2)
2021	The Matrix Resurrections	Ellster	
2021	Nafsi	Aisha	
2021	La Femme Anjola	Thabisa	Nigerian neo-noir crime thriller
2022	Salem	Zara Mufasa	Main cast
2022	Crime and Justice	Mrs. Mumbi	Episode: "The Death Squad"
2023	Second Family	Katherine	Telenovela
2025	The Chocolate Empire	Vera	Recurring role

== Awards and nominations ==
Year	Award	Category	Show	Result	Ref
2009	Kalasha International Film and TV Awards	Best Supporting Actress Film	Unseen, Unsung, Unforgotten	Won	
2012	Kalasha International Film and TV Awards	Best Supporting Actress Film	Shattered	Nominated	
2017	Kalasha International Film and TV Awards	Best Supporting Actress Film	Lina	Nominated	
2022	Africa Magic Viewers' Choice Awards	Best Supporting Actress	La Femme Anjola	Nominated	
