= Bullion (film) =

Ugandan drama film

- Directed by: Phillip Luswata
- Written by: Billy Ashaba
- Produced by: Henry Ssali
- Starring: Allan Tumusiime; Ainea Ojiambo; Juliana Kanyomozi; Anne Kansiime; Laura Kahunde; Veronica Tindi; Carol Agudo; Isaac Muwawu; Winnie Lalani; Wilberforce Muteta; Sylvia Owori; Gerald Rutaro; Michael Wawuyo Jr.; Michael Wawuyo
- Production company: Ssali Productions
- Release date: 5 April 2014 (Munyonyo Kampala)
- Country: Uganda
- Language: English

Bullion is a 2014 Ugandan crime drama film produced by Henry Ssali and directed by Phillip Luswata. The film stars Allan Tumusiime, Kenyan actor Ainea Ojiambo, singer Juliana Kanyomozi and her sister Laura Kahunde, radio presenter and Fun Factory's Veronica Tindi, comedian Anne Kansiime, Michael Wawuyo and his son Michael Wawuyo Jr.

== Summary ==
Collins Jjuuko, a bullion van driver desperately wants money to afford his daughter an open heart surgery in India. He joins a group of greedy bank employees to rob a bullion van. After the robbery, his colleagues set him up and take off with all the money and he is arrested. When he gets out of prison, he seeks payback.

== Production and premiere ==
The film was produced by Henry Ssali under his Ssali Productions. It was his second film to produce after producing Kiwani in 2008. It was executive produced by tycoon and businessman Sudhir Ruparelia who had also executive produced Kiwani. Preproduction and production started in 2009 while post production started and ended in 2014. It was then premiered in April 2014 in Munyonyo Kampala.

=== Casting ===
Auditions for the cast of the film started in 2009. Allan Tumusiime, who had previously worked on Ssali's first film Kiwani, was cast in the lead role as Collins Jjuuko. Kenyan Makutano Junction actor Ainea Ojiambo was cast as the antagonist through Phillip Luswata who also worked on Makutano Junction. Ssali also cast singer Juliana Kanyomozi who had debuted her acting career on his first film Kiwani.
