= Fundi-Mentals =

2015 Kenyan comedy drama

- Directed by: Alexandros Konstantaras
- Written by: Lizz Njagah; Alexandros Konstantaras
- Produced by: Lizz Njagah
- Starring: Lizz Njagah; Gerald Langiri; Charlie Karumi
- Cinematography: John Wambugu
- Release date: February 12, 2015
- Running time: 87 minutes
- Country: Kenya
- Languages: English; Swahili
- Budget: Ksh 5M

Fundi-Mentals is a 2015 Kenyan erotic comedy that was directed by Alexandros Konstantaras, who was also behind the House of Lungula that featured judge Ian Mbugua. The comedy has already been nominated in this year's Africa Magic Viewer's Choice Awards in the best actor in comedy award. The film stars Charlie Karumi, Gerald Langiri and Lizz Njagah.

== Production ==
The word 'Fundamentals' is very popular among Kenyans, only that here it bears a different meaning from its original one. The word gained massive popularity after Ken Wa Maria, a local Kamba musician, sang a song entitled "Fundamentals" purportedly referring to the 'assets' of a woman and since then the word became Kenyan slang term for the latter. Judging from the title, House of Lungula and now Fundi-mentals, the very common 'naughty' and very familiar Kenyan slang for the storylines only means that the movies tell the Kenyan story. As the producer Alex Konstantaras revealed, the idea for Fundi-mentals was inspired by a scene during the filming of House of Lungula. "There is a scene where the main character (Gerald Langiri) pretends that he is a fundi who fixes a chimney in order to come out from a difficult situation and that scene inspired me to come up with a character about a fundi who thinks that he can fix anything using unprofessional means," Alex said. In July 2014, the actress Lizz Njagah announced that the movie will also be available in Luo and Kikuyu dialects.

== Plot ==
The storyline of Fundi-mentals revolves around the lives of two Fundis (handymen), Joseph (Gerald Langiri) and his assistant Moses (Charlie Karumi) who like to think of themselves as the best Fundis in Kinoo estate despite their unorthodox methods of fixing things. The entry of a new multinational service company offering superior and more affordable services throws all this in jeopardy. To avoid going out of business, they introduce to their female customers a new type of Ex-press service with hilarious consequences.

== Cast ==
Actor	Character
Lizz Njagah	Mrs. Juma
Gerald Langiri	Joseph
Charlie Karumi	Moses
Ruth Maingi	
Florence Nduta	
Kalekye Mumo	
Milkah Ndegwa	
Naomi Ng'ang'a	
Ainea Ojiambo	
Veronica Waceke	

== Release and reception ==
Fundi-Mentals was released on February 12, 2015, in Nairobi. It was rated 18+ and during the release the audience was adults only. Reviewing for KenyaBuzz Wangechi Maina wrote, "Expect to see Fundi-Mentals boldly talk about it [sex] in the way you talk about sex with your peers, no holds barred. This makes Fundi-Mentals relatable."

== Awards and nominations ==
Year	Award	Category	Recipient	Result
2015	Kalasha International Awards	Best Supporting Actor in a Film	Charlie Karumi	Nominated
2015	Kalasha International Awards	Best Feature Film	Fundi-Mentals	Nominated
