= Ruth Ndulu Maingi =

Kenyan actress

Ruth Maingi
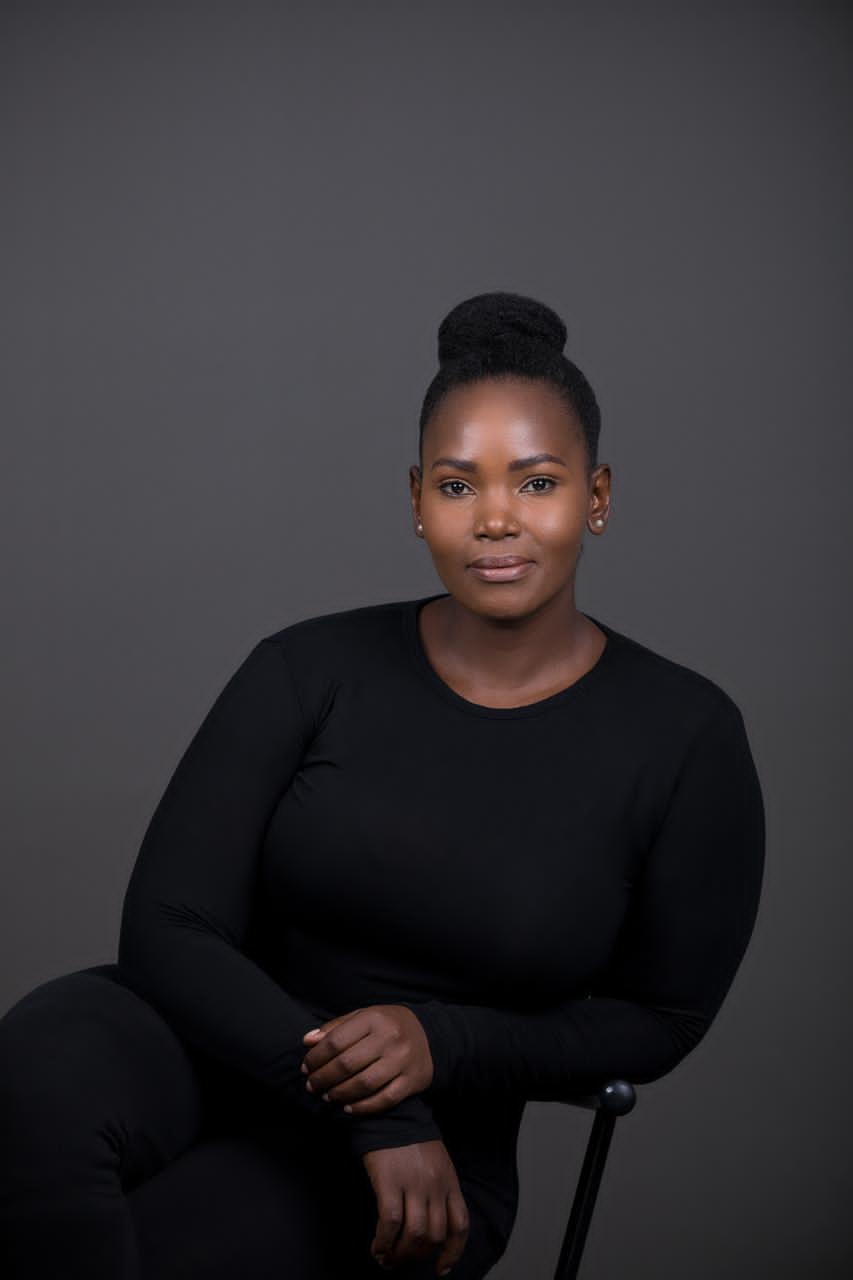
- Born: Ruth Ndulu Maingi; May 22, 1983 (age 42); Machakos, Kenya
- Education: Kathiani High School; Township Muslim Primary School
- Alma mater: London Film Academy
- Occupation: Actor. Dancer. Producer. Costume Designer
- Years active: 2007–present
- Children: 1

Ruth Ndulu Maingi (born May 22, 1983) is a Kenyan actress. She is best known for her roles in the films 18 Hours, The Distant Boat, and Midlife Crisis.

== Personal life & Education ==
Ruth Maingi, a Kenyan actress, was born on May 22, 1983, in Machakos, Kenya, as the fourth child in a family of six siblings. She received her primary education at Township Muslim Primary School in Machakos and later attended Kathiani High School for her secondary education. Following her high school graduation, Maingi pursued further studies and obtained a diploma in insurance.

Ruth Maingi pursued formal training in acting at the London Academy for Film and Television. She also studied dance and movement at the Kenya Performing Arts School.

== Career ==
Ruth began her career as a dancer, then later shifted to performing arts to pursue a career and joined Kenya National Theatre Performing Arts School for two years. In 2007, she joined Kigezi Ndoto Musical Theatre Performances. Then, in 2008, she moved to India and cast for Sauti Kimya and Githaa.

In 2011, she made her film debut with the film The Marshal of Finland, and in the same year, she was selected for a lead role in the television series Lies that Bind, which made her television debut. In the series, she played the role of 'Salome', the third wife and Richard Juma's true love, and the third wife. Then, in 2013, she starred in the popular Swahili drama Mama Duka in the titular role. For her role, she was later honoured at the 2014 Africa Magic Viewers Choice Awards.

She played a major role as a coach in the television serial The Team, with a media focus on Africa, produced by Dreamcatcher. In 2014, she starred in two films: The Next East African Film Maker and Orphan. In 2018, she made her Nollywood debut with the film Family First, directed by Lancelot Imasuen.

== Awards ==
Year	Award	Movie/Film	Category	Results	Ref
2022	Kenya Film Commission	Women In Film Awards (WIFA)	Best Costume Designer	Won	
2020	People's Film Festival	POKER	Best Actress	Won	
2020	Kalasha Awards	Midlife Crisis	Best Actress	Nominated	
2018	The Africa Film Festival (TAFF)	Awards	Humanitarian Awards	Won	
2017	African Broadcasting and Entertainment Awards (AHBEA)	N/A	Icon-African Movie Industry	Won	
2014	Kalasha Awards	TV Drama	Best Lead Actress	Nominated	
2014	AMVCA	Lies That Bind Episode 2 Season 2	Best Costume Designer	Nominated	

== Recognition ==
Ruth Maingi has received several recognitions for her contributions to the film industry and her advocacy work:

- In March 2024, she was appointed as the Kenyan representative at the upcoming African Leadership Conference held in Ghana.
- In 2023, she was appointed as an ambassador of the African Cultural Film Festival (AFRICUFF) in Houston.
- She was appointed as an advocate at the Kings Hearts Advocacy for Women and Children Foundation.
- She was also appointed as an advocate for the Feed the Poor Foundation, a non-profit organization operating in America and Africa.
- In March 2022, she was recognized among the 100 women honored during Women's History Month by Women in Film.

== Filmography ==
Year	Film	Role	Genre	Ref.
2012	The Marshal of Finland	Maria	Film	
2013	Mama Duka	Mama Duka	TV series short	
2013	The Distant Boat	Ruth Malombe	Film	
2015	Fundi-Mentals		Film	
2017	18 Hours		Film	
2018	Family First	Matelo	Film	
2019	The System	Rachel	TV series	
2020	Lies that Bind	Salome	TV series	
2020	Midlife Crisis	Gigi, Stylist	Film	
2023	Play Back	Katherine	Film	
2023	Finding Joy	Sister	Film	
2023	Daddy's Call	Mum	Film	
