= Charles Ouda =

Kenyan actor (1986–2024)

- Born: Charles Joseph Onyango Ouda; 3 July 1985; Nairobi, Kenya
- Died: 3 February 2024 (aged 38); Nairobi, Kenya
- Burial place: Kariokor Cemetery
- Citizenship: Kenyan
- Occupations: Actor; TV host; Producer; Director; Singer; TV host; Voice overt artist
- Years active: 2002 - 2024

Charles "Charlie" J. Ouda (July 3, 1985 – February 3, 2024) was a Kenyan actor, writer, director, television host, voice-over artist, singer, and events manager. He died on 3 February 2024 in Nairobi at the age of 38.

== Early life and education ==
Born in Nairobi, Kenya, Ouda began his professional career in the arts as early as 2002. In 2014, he moved to New York to study at the Lee Strasberg Theatre & Film Institute, undertaking a two-year conservatory program. There he trained alongside established industry figures such as Mauricio Bustamante and Paul Calderón.

== Career ==
=== Theatre and stage ===
Ouda's first known stage appearance was in the musical Lwanda: Man of Stone at the Kenya National Theatre. Over his career, he performed in at least 15 plays and seven musicals, leading in roles such as Joseph in Joseph and the Amazing Technicolor Dreamcoat, Tony in Boy Gets Girl, Fick in Balm in Gilead, Mr. Black in Andrew Lippa’s Wild Party, Ernest Everhard in The Iron Heel, and his Kenya Theatre Awards-winning performance in the African debut of The Manic Monologues. His theatre work included performances in New York.

=== Television and film ===
On television, Ouda performed on Makutano Junction for over twelve seasons. His other screen credits included Better Days, Changing Times, Higher Learning, Changes, Mali, Second Family, Pepeta, Crime and Justice on Showmax, in which he played Kenneth Mumbi, and Salem on Maisha Magic, where he played Mel.

He also hosted and wrote for the educational children's show The Know Zone and co-hosted the youth program Discovery +254 alongside Sarah Hassan, winning the Kalasha Award for Best TV Host in 2015. He further appeared as a coach on Tusker Project Fame. His film credits include The First Grader, Sienna’s Choice, MAD, and Count It Out.

Beyond acting, Ouda was also an accomplished director and writer. His short film Who Are You? earned him the Best Director award at the 2016 Asian American Film Lab 72-Hour Shoot Out, while Waiting Room and Count It Out received Merit and Platinum Awards at the NYC Indie Film Awards and the Best Shorts Competition . In music, he co-wrote the song Fire in Your Kiss for the Coca-Cola PopStars group SEMA and released his own single Superstar, featuring Dan Aceda.

== Filmography ==
Year	Title	Role	Notes
2007 - 2013	Makutano Junction	Pipi	Cast, Writer
2018	Sidney & Friends	Sidney's father	Voice
2011–2015	Mali		Writer
2024	Panda Bear in Africa	Abu, Mr Python, Jackal 3	Voice
2011	Aphrodite		Writer, Director
2016	Them		Director
2017	Count It Out	The Man	Cast, Director, Writer
2017	Bench		Director
2018	Waiting Room	Dr Desmonds	Cast, Director, Writer
2016	Who are You		Director
2010	The First Grader	School teacher	Cast
2016	Mad	Angry Man	Cast
2016	Sienna's Choice	Dr Salvatore	Cast
2022 - 2024	Salem	Mel Karani	Cast
2021	Real	Bruce	Cast
2023	Pepeta	Pathologist 1	Cast
2023	Twende	Kimbe, Sugu, Crowd Extra 2	Voice
2022	Crime and Justice	Kenneth Mumbi	Cast
2021	Exposure 36	Cam	Cast
2019	For the Benefit of Mr. Winston	Samuel Konde	Cast

== Nominations and awards ==
Year	Award	Category	Show	Result
2016	Hudson Valley International Film Festival	Best Ensemble cast	Sienna's Choice	Nominated
2017	NYC Indie Film Awards	Best Directory - Gold Award	Waiting Room	Won
2017	NYC Indie Film Awards	Best Short Film - Platinum Award	Count It Out	Nominated
2017	LA Shorts Award	Best Trailer - Diamond Award	Waiting Room	Won
2017	Best Shorts Competition	Film Short - Award Merit	Count It Out	Won
2017	Best Shorts Competition	Short Film - Award Merit	Count It Out	Won
2017	Best Shorts Competition	Short Film - Award Merit	Waiting Room	Won
2022	Kenya Theatre Awards	Best Performance by a Male Actor	The Manic Monologues	Won
2024	Kalasha International Film and TV Awards	Best Lead Actor in TV Drama	Salem	Won
2015	Kalasha International Film and TV Awards	Best host in TV Show	Discovery 254+	Won
