= Wanade =

Kenyan actress

- Born: Beth Nyambura Mbaya c. 1967
- Died: May 10, 2013; Nairobi
- Occupation: Actress
- Spouse: Robert Mbaya
- Children: 2

Beth Nyambura Mbaya (c. 1967 – May 10, 2013), professionally known as Wanade, was a Kenyan television actress. She was a prominent figure in the Kenyan entertainment industry and gained recognition for her leading roles in popular local television series such as Mother in Law and Know Zone.

Wanade was married to Robert Mbaya. The couple had two sons both of whom entered show business: Mungai Mbaya, who is the host of the children's show, Know Zone, and an actor on the Kenya Broadcasting Corporation (KBC) soap opera, Makutano Junction, and actor Kamau Mbaya, who is best known for playing Baha on the Machachari series which airs on citizen TV Kenya and starring in the Kenyan Biography of Kimani Maruge, The First Grader. . Wanade's older sister is the Kenyan screenwriter, Naomi Kamau, while her brother Joseph Kinuthia, known by the stage name, Omosh, has starred in the television show, Tahidi High.

Wanade died from cancer at her sister's home in the Kahawa Sukari suburb of Nairobi on May 10, 2013, at the age of 46.
