= Poacher (film) =

2018 short film directed by Tom Whitworth

- Directed by: Tom Whitworth
- Written by: Davina Leonard; Tom Whitworth
- Starring: Brian Ogola; Davina Leonard; Lenny Juma
- Release date: August 2018
- Running time: 29 minutes
- Countries: Kenya, United Kingdom
- Languages: Swahili; English

Poacher is a 2018 Kenyan / British short film directed by Tom Whitworth. The film received wide international attention after its release in Netflix in September 2020. It also became the first ever Kenyan short film to be premier via Netflix.

== Plot ==
Shot in a dramatic film format, Poacher tells the story of a desperate farmer who runs into trouble after stealing a stash of blood ivory from a gang of international terrorists. The film seeks to highlight the significant international issue of illegal ivory trade by addressing the plight of Africa's endangered elephant population.

== Cast ==
- Brian Ogola as Mutua
- Davina Leonard as Nicola Betts
- Lenny Juma as Juma
- Shiviske Shivisi as Ngina
- Olwenya Maina as Hassan

== Production ==
Poacher was filmed over six days in the Tsavo West National Park to the South East of Kenya's capital, Nairobi. The production involved over 30 cast and crew members. Director Tom Whitworth teased the first official still of the film on 10 April 2018, announcing that cinematography was by Nathan Prior and Ishmael Azeli. It was revealed that the short film was originally envisioned as a TV drama.

== Release ==
Poacher (2018) was released in August 2018, having been screened at the Short To The Point (STTP) Festival, and been selected for a Best Editing Award. The film premiered in Kenya at the ANGA IMAX Theatre on 10 November 2018 at the Kalasha International Film Awards in Nairobi. Poacher has also screened at the 2018 Moscow Shorts International Short Film Festival in September 2018 in Moscow. The film was streamed via Netflix on 30 September 2020.

== Accolades ==
- Nominated for Best Short Film, Best Director, Best Director of Photography, Best Supporting Actor in a Film and Best Actor in a Film for the 8th Kalasha TV & Film Awards.
- Award for Best Short Film at the 8th Kalasha TV & Film Awards in Nairobi, Kenya on 24 November 2018.
