= Noose of Gold =

- Genre: Soap opera
- Created by: Benjamin Odiwuor
- Written by: Benjamin Odiwuor; Joe Wahome; Raha Gatwiri
- Directed by: Benjamin Odiwuor
- Starring: Ainea Ojiambo; Naomi Ng'ang'a; Nana Gichuru; Damaris Matunda; Godfrey Odhiambo; Mumbi Lukwihili; Serah Ndanu; Brenda Mwai
- Theme music composer: Simon Njoroge
- Country of origin: Kenya
- Original language: English
- No. of seasons: 3

Production
- Executive producer: Benjamin Odiwuor
- Production location: Nairobi
- Editor: Scolar Mworia
- Camera setup: Multi-camera
- Running time: 24-27 minutes
- Production company: Maxpot Media

Original release
- Network: NTV

Noose of Gold is a Kenyan television soap opera that premiered on NTV in 2010. It is created, directed and produced by Benjamin Odiwuor in conjunction with Maxpot Media. It is topbilled by an ensemble cast that has: Ainea Ojiambo, Nana Gichuru, Naomi Ng'ang'a, Serah Ndanu, Damaris Matunda and a supporting cast. It ran for three seasons from 2010 to 2013.

== Cast ==
=== Regular cast ===
- Ainea Ojiambo as Ole Mpisha
- Mumbi Lukwihili as Laboso
- Serah Ndanu as Soila
- Naomi Ng'ang'a as Madeline
- Damaris Matunda as Tmaq
- Nana Gichuru as Felma
- Abel Amuga as Theo
- Raymond Ofula as Shibi
- Wanja Mworia as Telka
- Nobert Ouma as Jawabu
- Avril as Corrine
- Godfrey Odhiambo
- Ken Ambani as Mr. Temu
- Martin Githinji
- Damaris Matunda
- Brenda Mwai
- Grace Dola
- Janet Sision

=== Supporting cast ===
- Kirk Foda as Oraro
- Mary Goiche as Lawyer
- Joseph Kinyua as Doc
- Kirumburu Ng'ng'a as Kirira
- Godfrey Waiharo as Lemayan

== Broadcast ==
Noose of Gold' debuted in Kenya in 2010 on NTV network. It was broadcast for 3 seasons on the primetime 8:20pm timeslot. It aired across Africa in the Africa Magic Channel. In Uganda, it aired on NTV Uganda.
