= Maqbul Mohammed =

Kenyan actor and radio presenter (born 1981)

- Born: Makbul Mohammed; 7 March 1981 (age 44); Mombasa, Kenya
- Occupations: Actor; radio presenter
- Years active: 1990s–present
- Known for: Makutano Junction
- Children: 3

Maqbul Mohammed (born 7 March 1981) is a Kenyan actor and radio presenter. He is known for his role (Donavan) in both Auntie Boss and Varshita!, Kenya's first interlinked comedy series both produced by Moonbeam productions. He also featured in Kenya's first ever crime and legal drama Crime and Justice. Maqbul's career as an actor pivoted when he featured in Makutano Junction, which was one of the longest running local TV Series in Kenya from 2005 to 2009. Maqbul's latest film project was crime and justice which was aired on Showmax. He has also acted in other projects like lies that bind.

== Early life ==
Born in Mombasa on 7 March 1981, Maqbul is brother to actress Shadya Delgush.

== Personal life ==
He is a father of three.

== Career ==
Maqbul joined theater immediately after secondary school at the phoenix theaters in 1999 Horning his skills on stage for the next 4 years featuring in numerous plays which would earn him a tv call up at the Kenya Broadcasting Corporation.

Maqbul has featured in numerous television series and films. His major breakthrough to the entertainment industry was in 2006 for his role as Karis in series Makutano Junction. He would later star and feature in many tv shows like Auntie Boss, Varshita and Crime and Justice He has subsequently appeared in a number of films such as; Behind Closed Doors, Kwani Readings Weakness, All Girls Together,.

He first appeared on TV as a teenager in the KBC TV drama Reflections. In 2011, he was cast as one of the main characters in the award-winning soap opera Lies that Bind. He shared credits with Ruth Maingi, Maureen Koech, Justine Mirichii and Florence Nduta. Due to his great performance in the project, he was nominated in the 2013 Kalasha Awards. In 2015, he had a leading role in comedy Auntie Boss! alongside Eve D'Souza. Apart from acting, Maqbul was a radio presenter for over 15 years, having worked at Capital FM and recently Headed Radio department at Nation Fm and Managing director at NRG media groups.

== Filmography ==
Film

Year	Project	Role	Title
2008	All Girls Together	Felix	Cameo
2009	Weakness	Nicky	

Television

Year	Project	Role	Title
2007	Makutano Junction	Karis Mabuki	
2011-2012	Lies that Bind	Justine Mareba	Nominated—Kalasha Award for Best Supporting Actor in Drama
2015–- 2020	Auntie Boss!	Donavan	Season 2–2020
2017–2019	Varshita	Donavan	Lead role
2021 - 2022	Crime and Justice	DCI Boss Kebo	supporting role
