= Nice Githinji =

Kenyan actress

Nice Gìthìnji
- Born: Nice Gìthìnji; 25 August 1985 (age 40); Mombasa, Kenya
- Citizenship: Kenyan
- Occupations: Actress; model; singer; producer; karaoke hostess; TV presenter
- Years active: 2002 – present
- Height: 5 ft 3 in (160 cm)

Nice Gìthìnji (born 25 August 1985) is a Kenyan actress, producer, karaoke hostess, vocalist and TV show host. She is most notable for playing various roles in several television series.

== Background ==
Gìthìnji came into the limelight after being nominated for the 2009 Kalasha Awards as the Best Lead Actress in the film, All Girls Together. In 2011, she won the coveted award for Best lead actress for her role in a drama television series, Changing Times.

Nice is also the CEO of Nicebird Production Company that majors in film productions and participates in theatrical performance. According to her time-to-time statement, these performances are the core of her.

Nice has worked with film industry veterans like Et Cetera Productions (2007–2008: where she starred in two movies; the critically acclaimed, Benta and All Girls Together, Sisimka Productions, Phoenix Players –and Planet's Theater.

In 2023, Nice Gìthìnji was featured in Netflix's Big Mouth Season 7 Episode 6 in which she voiced the Hormone Monstress character. She was featured alongside Lupita Ny'ongo and Nyokabi Macharia.

In 2024, Nice starred in Kenya's first sci-fi series Subterranea on Showmax as the character Grey.

== Early life and education ==
Nice was born in 1985 in Mombasa and spent her childhood in Makongeni. She did her high school in Senior Chief Koinange High School from 1999 to 2002. Her mother died when she had finished high school. She then started acting workshops at the Kenya National theatre.

== Career ==
=== Early career beginnings and initialization of showbiz career ===
Nice Gìthìnji began her acting career as a stage actress at Phoenix Players Richard Stockwell's Bad Blood, a role that catapulted her career at large. She has appeared in a number of Television and film productions.

=== 2007–2009 ===
Between 2007 and 2010, She appeared in a number of films namely, Benta, All Girls Together, Formula X and Pieces of Peace. She also starred in television series; Guy Centre and Changing Times where she played Candy and Rosa respectively.

== Filmography ==
=== Film and television ===
Year	Project	Role	Notes
2007	Benta	Sheana	with Janet Kirina
2008	All Girls Together	Sasha	Also producer
2008	Formula X	Cindy	
2008	Unseen, Unsung, Unforgotten	Rita	
2008	Pieces of Peace	Wairimu	2007 Post-Election violence film
2009	Guy Centre	Candy	
2010–2012	Changing Times (TV series)	Rosa	Main role
2010	Kidnappet	Lilly	
2011	Saints	Nurse Millicent	
2012	Better Days	Nelly	
2012	Consequences		Producer
2013–present	African Urban Entertainment	Presenter	
2013	House of Lungula	Charity	Cast
2014	East		
2014	Home		
2014	Six		
2014	Flowers and Bricks		
2015	How to Find a Husband		
2016–present	Makutano Junction	Toni	Cast - Replaced Wanja Mworia from season 15
2016–2017	Tumaini Senta	Taabu	Lead role
2017-	The Squad (TV series)	Herself	Panel member
2018	Rafiki	Nduta	Cast
2019	Lusala	Maggie	Cast
2020	Paukwa	Wanja	Cast, Short film
2022	Country Queen	Grace	Cast, TV series (6 episodes)
2023	The Caller	Koki Mandla	Directed by Likarion Wainaina
2024	Subterranea	Grey	Cast, TV series
2023	Midnight Van		Cast, Producer
2022	Crime and Justice		Cast, TV series (1 episode)
2018	Subira	Mwana	Cast
2018	Nganya	Malaika	Cast, Producer, TV series
2023	Big Mouth		Voice
2023	These Are Moments to Die For		Director, Producer, Short film

== Nominations and awards ==
Year	Award	Category	Show	Result
2018	Kalasha International Film and TV Awards	Best Supporting Actress Film	Subira	Nominated
2015	Kalasha International Film and TV Awards	Best Lead Actress Film	Letter Home	Nominated
2009	Kalasha International Film and TV Awards	Best Lead Actress Film	All Girls Together	Won
