= List of Makutano Junction episodes =

Episodes of the Kenyan soap opera

Makutano Junction is a Kenyan soap opera that premiered in 2007. It captures different themes that affect the normal African society. The main contemporary issues that are mostly stressed in the drama are: corruption, education, early marriages and pregnancies, HIV/AIDS, human rights, social justice, values and perceptions, and conflict resolution. The story is set in a fictional village named Makutano and the ensemble cast is composed of different Kenyan actors.

== Episodes ==
=== Series 1 ===
No. overall	No. in series	Title	Directed by	Written by
1	1	"Arrivals"	Andrew Gosling	Philip Luswata
2	2	"Money Matters"	Andrew Gosling	Naomi Ng'ang'a
3	3	"Parental Control"	Andrew Gosling	Lucia Shikuku
4	4	"Milk and Lingala"	Andrew Gosling	Abubakar Mwenda
5	5	"Husbands"	Andrew Gosling, Mary Migui and Salome Kinyanjui	Catejan Boy
6	6	"Dirty Tricks"	Andrew Gosling, Mary Migui and Salome Kinyanjui	Philip Luswata
7	7	"Too Little Too Late"	Andrew Gosling, Mary Migui and Salome Kinyanjui	Catejan Boy
8	8	"Explanations"	Andrew Gosling, Mary Migui and Salome Kinyanjui	Lucia Shikuku
9	9	"Cooking the Books"	Andrew Gosling, Mary Migui and Salome Kinyanjui	Abubakar Mwenda
10	10	"Joining Forces"	Andrew Gosling, Mary Migui and Salome Kinyanjui	Naomi Kamau
11	11	"The Choice"	Andrew Gosling, Mary Migui and Salome Kinyanjui	Catejan Boy
12	12	"Betrayal"	Andrew Gosling, Mary Migui and Salome Kinyanjui	Naomi Kamau and Lucia Shikuku
13	13	"New Beginnings"	Andrew Gosling, Mary Migui and Salome Kinyanjui	Philip Luswata

=== Series 2 ===
No. overall	No. in series	Title	Directed by	Written by
14	1	"The Prodigal Son"	Andrew Gosling, Mary Migui and Salome Kinyanjui	Philip Luswata
15	2	"Give and Take"	Andrew Gosling, Mary Migui and Salome Kinyanjui	Philip Luswata and Kara Manley
16	3	"Life Saver"	Andrew Gosling, Mary Migui and Salome Kinyanjui	Simiyu Barasa
17	4	"New Beginnings"	Andrew Gosling, Mary Migui and Salome Kinyanjui	Philip Luswata and Kara Manley
18	5	"The Truth will be Out"	Andrew Gosling	Philip Luswata and Kara Manley
19	6	"Girl Power"	Andrew Gosling, Mary Migui and Salome Kinyanjui	Philip Luswata and Kara Manley
20	7	"All that Glitters"	Andrew Gosling	Philip Luswata
21	8	"Green Gold"	Andrew Gosling, Mary Migui and Salome Kinyanjui	Philip Luswata and Kara Manley
22	9	"War of Words"	Andrew Gosling, Mary Migui and Salome Kinyanjui	Philip Luswata
23	10	"A House is not a Home"	Andrew Gosling, Mary Migui and Salome Kinyanjui	Philip Luswata
24	11	"Ripples of Love"	Andrew Gosling	Philip Luswata and Kara Manley
25	12	"Payback Time"	Andrew Gosling, Mary Migui and Salome Kinyanjui	Philip Luswata and Kara Manley
26	13	"Till Death Do us Part"	Andrew Gosling, Mary Migui and Salome Kinyanjui	Philip Luswata and Kara Manley

=== Series 3 ===
No. overall	No. in series	Title	Directed by	Written by
27	1	"The Curse"	Shani Grewal	Naomi Kamau
28	2	"Positive Energy"	Shani Grewal	Philip Luswata
29	3	"Battle of the sexes"	Shani Grewal	Lucia Shikuku
30	4	"Schemers"	Shani Grewal	Patrick Serro
31	5	"A Thief in the Night"	Shani Grewal	Simiyu Barasa
32	6	"Stepping onto Toes"	Shani Grewal	Philip Luswata
33	7	"Goals"	Shani Grewal	Naomi Kamau
34	8	"Caught Red Handed"	Shani Grewal	Patrick Serro
35	9	"Spare the Rod"	Shani Grewal	Lucia Shikuku
36	10	"Magical Nights"	Shani Grewal	Philip Luswata
37	11	"Standing Up"	Shani Grewal	Philip Luswata
38	12	"To be a Woman"	Shani Grewal	Philip Luswata
39	13	"Crossing Over"	Shani Grewal	Philip Luswata

=== Series 4 ===
No. overall	No. in series	Title	Directed by	Written by
40	1	"What is Life"	Shani Grewal	Naomi Kamau
41	2	"A Tickling Upstairs"	Shani Grewal	Philip Luswata
42	3	"A Remedy of Grievances"	Shani Grewal	Wanjiru Kairu
43	4	"The Score"	Shani Grewal	Simiyu Barasa
44	5	"Big Decisions"	Shani Grewal	Lucia Shikuku
45	6	"Cards on the Table"	Shani Grewal	Patrick Serro
46	7	"Double Matata"	Shani Grewal	Philip Luswata
47	8	"Bobby is back"	Shani Grewal	Wanjiru Kairu
48	9	"Measure for Measure"	Shani Grewal	Victor Gatonye
49	10	"Power of a Woman"	Shani Grewal	Naomi Kamau
50	11	"Hopes and Dreams"	Shani Grewal	Simiyu Barasa
51	12	"Scales of Justice"	Shani Grewal	Patrick Serro
52	13	"Mystery Hand"	Shani Grewal	Philip Luswata

=== Series 5 ===
No. overall	No. in series	Title	Directed by	Written by
53	1	"Sleeping Beauty"	Shani Grewal	Philip Luswata
54	2	"Who's the Man"	Shani Grewal	Simiyu Barasa
55	3	"Another Piece of Cloth"	Shani Grewal	Victor Gatonye
56	4	"Trial & Tribulation"	Shani Grewal	Patrick Serro
57	5	"Lost Love"	Shani Grewal	Damaris Irungu
58	6	"Answered Prayers"	Shani Grewal	Philip Luswata and Kara Manley
59	7	"The Stand Off"	Shani Grewal	Charles Ouda
60	8	"A Family Affair"	Shani Grewal	Philip Luswata and Kara Manley
61	9	"Caught Pants Down"	Shani Grewal and Victor Gatonye	Simiyu Barasa
62	10	"Smelling Scavengers"	Shani Grewal	Morrison Mwadulo
63	11	"Remains of the Day"	Victor Gatonye	Patrick Serro
64	12	"Going...Going...Gone"	Shani Grewal	Victor Gatonye
65	13	"Tumble Tumble Tumble"	Shani Grewal	Philip Luswata

=== Series 6 ===
No. overall	No. in series	Title	Directed by	Written by
66	1	"New Kid on the Block"	Victor Gatonye	Philip Luswata
67	2	"For the Ones We Love"	Shani Grewal	Wanjiru Kairu
68	3	"Opaque"	Victor Gatonye	Victor Gatonye
69	4	"New Day, Renewed Hope"	Victor Gatonye	Damaris Irungu
70	5	"You'll Never Walk Alone"	Shani Grewal	Charles Ouda
71	6	"A Friend in Need"	Shani Grewal	Benjamin Odiwuor
72	7	"Conspiracies"	Victor Gatonye	Simiyu Barasa
73	8	"Crossing The River"	Victor Gatonye	Philip Luswata
74	9	"No Guts. No Glory."	Victor Gatonye	Wanjiru Kairu
75	10	"Turning Point"	Victor Gatonye	Simiyu Barasa
76	11	"What's Love Got to do with it"	Victor Gatonye	Damaris Irungu
77	12	"Journey's End"	Shani Grewal	Charles Ouda
78	13	"Tumble Tumble Tumble"	Shani Grewal	Philip Luswata

=== Series 7 ===
No. overall	No. in series	Title	Directed by	Written by
79	1	"Familiar Problems"	Illy	Victor Gatonye
80	2	"Look Twice"	Victor Gatonye	Charles Ouda
81	3	"A Snake's Hug"	Illy	Philip Luswata
82	4	"Small Ideas, Big Solutions"	Victor Gatonye	Patrick Serro
83	5	"Light At The End Of The Tunnel"	Illy	Damaris Irungu
84	6	"Denial"	Victor Gatonye	Natasha Likimani
85	7	"Utter Despair"	Illy	Wanjiru Kairu
86	8	"Blowing the Wind"	Victor Gatonye	Marrisson Mwadulo
87	9	"Painful Past, Unbearable Future"	Illy	Charles Ouda
88	10	"Scrappy Love"	Victor Gatonye	Benjamin Odiwuor
89	11	"Debt Collectors"	Illy	Wanjiru Kairu
90	12	"Moving Goal Posts"	Victor Gatonye	Simiyu Barasa
91	13	"Judgement Day"	Illy	Phillip Luswata

=== Series 8 ===
No. overall	No. in series	Title	Directed by	Written by
92	1	"Advanced Forces"	Victor Gatonye	Phillip Luswata
93	2	"The Games People Play"	Victor Gatonye	Benjamin Odiwuor
94	3	"Will It Shine Again?"	Penny Shales	Damaris Irungu
95	4	"Haunted"	Wanjiru Kairu	Charles Ouda
96	5	"Do The Right Thing"	Penny Shales	Wanjiru Kairu
97	6	"Cold Nights"	Victor Gatonye	Morrison Mwadulo
98	7	"Aftermath"	Penny Shales	Natasha Likimani
99	8	"Storm in a Cup"	Victor Gatonye	Patrick Serro
100	9	"Final Destination"	Victor Gatonye	Philip Luswata
101	10	"Back To Square One"	Penny Shales	Wanjiru Kairu
102	11	"Duffel Bag Boy"	Victor Gatonye	Natasha Likinani
103	12	"Tomorrow is Too Late"	Penny Shales	Morrison Mwadulo
104	13	"Healing Hands and Healing Hearts"	Penelope Shales	Charles Ouda

=== Series 9 ===
No. overall	No. in series	Title	Directed by	Written by
105	1	"Appearances & Disappearances"	Penelope Shales	Simiyu Barasa
106	2	"Problems Choose No House"	Victor Gatonye	Philip Luswata
107	3	"Boomerang People"	Victor Gatoyne	Philip Luswata
108	4	"Dark Cold Night"	Penelope Shales	Damaris Irungu
109	5	"Changing Lanes"	Victor Gatonye	Victor Ogolah
110	6	"Cash Money Sisters"	Victor Gatonye	Philip Luswata
111	7	"Expressions"	Penelope Shales	Simiyu Barasa
112	8	"Mind Playing Tricks"	Penelope Shales	Charles Ouda
113	9	"Silver Lining"	Derrick Omfwoko	Natasha Likimani
114	10	"Relationships"	Victor Gatonye	Natasha Likimani
115	11	"Shaving The Barbers"	Derrick Omfwoko	Morrison Mwadulo
116	12	"The Birds Flew"	Victor Gatonye	Patrick Serro
117	13	"Breaking The Surface"	Penelope Shales	Charles Ouda

=== Series 10 ===
No. overall	No. in series	Title	Directed by	Written by
118	1	"Tough Decisions"	Victor Gatonye	Simiyu Barasa
119	2	"Money Matters"	Penelope Shales	Wanjiru Kairu
120	3	"Pound of Flesh"	Penelope Shales	Patrick Serro
121	4	"Guess Who's Back"	Victor Gatonye	Victor Ogolah
122	5	"Tomorrow Never Dies"	Penelope Shales	Philip Luswata
123	6	"Moment of Silence"	Penelope Shales	Natasha Likimani
124	7	"Looking Back Over The Shoulder"	Victor Gatonye	Charles Ouda
125	8	"Live and Let Live"	Victor Gatonye	Philip Luswata
126	9	"Hidden Agenda"	Derrick Omfwoko	Natasha Likimani
127	10	"Who Will Save The Day?"	Penelope Shales	Damaris Irungu
128	11	"Through The Wall"	Victor Gatonye	Morrison Mwadulo
129	12	"Bamboozled"	Penelope Shales	Wanjiru Kairu
130	13	"Banking on You"	Victor Gatonye	Simiyu Barasa

=== Series 11 ===
No. overall	No. in series	Title	Directed by	Written by
131	1	"The D Squad"	Victor Gatonye	Philip Luswata
132	2	"Patch Time"	Victor Gatonye	Philip Luswata
133	3	"Welcome To Heartbreak"	Victor Gatonye	Natasha Likimani
134	4	"Keeping It in The Family"	Victor Gatonye	Natasha Likimani
135	5	"Good Times"	Victor Gatonye	Natasha Likimani
136	6	"Putting Back Together"	Victor Gatonye	Charles Ouda
137	7	"Mixed Messages"	Derrick Omfwoko	Charles Ouda
138	8	"Piped Dreams"	Victor Gatonye	Victor Ogolah
139	9	"Hands Off"	Victor Gatonye	Patrick Serro
140	10	"Daddy Knows Best"	Victor Gatonye	Morrison Mwadulo
141	11	"Say What You Want"	Derrick Omfwoko	Charles Ouda
142	12	"It's Not Over Yet"	Victor Gatonye	Damaris Irungu

=== Series 12 ===
No. overall	No. in series	Title	Directed by	Written by
143	1	"Wilhelm Screams"	Vincent Mbaya, Derrick Omfwoko & Michael Mwangi Jones	Wanjiru Kairu
144	2	"Voting Blues"	Derrick Omfwoko	Michael Osando
145	3	"Party Talk"	Derrick Omfwoko	Charles Ouda
146	4	"Keeping It Right"	Vincent Mbaya	Charles Ouda
147	5	"Lights Everyone"	Derrick Omfwoko	Damaris Irungu
148	6	"Soul Searching"	Derrick Omfwoko	Damaris Irungu
149	7	"Stranger on a Trial"	Derrick Omfwoko	Wanjiru Kairu
150	8	"When Good People Do Nothing"	Vincent Mbaya	Natasha Likimani
151	9	"The Switch"	Derrick Omfwoko	Joan Carpenter
152	10	"Down and Out"	Derrick Omfwoko	Natasha Likimani
153	11	"The Big Debate"	Vincent Mbaya	Philip Luswata
154	12	TBA	TBA	TBA
155	13	"Secret Lives"	Michael Mwangi Jones	Joanne Carpenter

=== Series 13 ===
No. overall	No. in series	Title	Directed by	Written by
156	1	"Till We Meet Again"	Derrick Omfwoko	Natasha Likimani
157	2	"Careless Whispers"	Vincent Mbaya	Charles Ouda
158	3	"This Woman's Work"	Vincent Mbaya	Charles Ouda
159	4	"Win Some, Lose Some"	Derrick Omfwoko	Wanjiru Kairu
160	5	"D-day"	Derrick Omfwoko	Damaris Irungu
161	6	"Good Times"	Vincent Mbaya	Damaris Irungu
162	7	TBA	TBA	TBA
163	8	"Sukuma Forwards"	Derrick Omfwoko	Philip Luswata
164	9	"Sisterhood"	Derrick Omfwoko	Joanne Carpenter
165	10	TBA	TBA	TBA
166	11	"Conspiracy Untangled"	TBA	Morrison Mwadulo
167	12	"Fiery Gospel"	Derrick Omfwoko	Philip Luswata
168	13	TBA	TBA	TBA

=== Series 14 ===
No. overall	No. in series	Title	Directed by	Written by
169	1	"Rebirth"	Lisa Sabrina Harney	Philip Luswata and Wanjiru Kairu
170	2	"The Graduate"	Lisa Sabrina Harney	Damaris Irungu
171	3	"Clarity"	Lisa Sabrina Harney	Damaris Irungu and Natsha Likimani
172	4	"Baby Shower"	Lisa Sabrina Harney	Wanjiru Kairu and Mkaiwawi Mwakaba
173	5	"Outbreak"	Lisa Sabrina Harney	Mercy Mwakaba and Natasha Likimani
174	6	"Vijana Tusome"	Lisa Sabrina Harney	Damaris Irungu
175	7	"Money, Money, Money"	Patricia Gichinga	Natasha Likimani and Damaris Irungu
176	8	"Caught In The Act"	Mkwaiwawi Mwakaba	Philip Luswata
177	9	"Ouster"	Lisa Sabrina Harney	Wanjiru Kairu
178	10	"Haki Yetu"	Lisa Sabrina Harney	Damaris Irungu
179	11	TBA	Lisa Sabrina Harney	TBA
180	12	"Hoodwinked"	Lisa Sabrina Harney	Wanjiru Kairu
181	13	"Beatrice Come Home"	Lisa Sabrina Harney	Wanjiru Kairu

=== Series 15 ===
No. overall	No. in series	Title	Directed by	Written by
182	1	"Since You've Been Gone"	Mkaiwawi Mwakaba	Wanjiru Kairu
183	2	"Big Ideas"	Patricia Gichinga	Damaris Irungu
184	3	"At Logger Heads"	Patricia Gichinga	Mkaiwawi Mwakaba
185	4	"Persist"	Mkaiwawi Mwakaba	Natasha Likimani
186	5	"Sheller Shelved"	Patricia Gichinga	Philip Luswata
187	6	"Change The Record"	Mkaiwawi Mwakaba	Wanjiru Kairu
188	7	"The Governor's Debate"	Patricia Gichinga	Wanjiru Kairu
189	8	"Rugged Tunes"	Patricia Gichinga	Philip Luswata
190	9	"Hustle And Flo"	Mkaiwawi Mwakaba	Natasha Likimani
191	10	"Tough Choices"	Patricia Gichinga	Natasha Likimani
