= Kalekye Mumo =

Kenyan singer

- Born: born in 1976
- Occupations: Singer and media executive

Kalekye Mumo (born in 1976) is a Kenyan media personality and singer.

== Career ==
Mumo was born in 1976. She worked for the Turkish embassy and later at HomeBoyz. She then moved to sound production as a sound engineer for Madeva TV. She was hired by 98.4 Capital FM as a breakfast host and later she was hired by Kiss FM as a news editor and reader. In 2016, she left kiss FM and was hired as a presenter for K24 TV for two years. She left the media after being in it for 13 years so that she could focus on her Public Relations company. Her PR firm was launched at the Villa Rosa Kempinski in 2016.
