= Crime and Justice (Kenyan TV series) =

Kenyan TV series

- Genre: mystery-crime, and drama
- Directed by: Adam Neutzsky-Wulff; Edwin Kamau; Likarion Wainaina; David 'Tosh' Gitonga
- Starring: Sarah Hassan; Alfred Munyua; Maqbul Mohammed; Paul Ogola; Brian Ogola
- Country of origin: Kenya
- Original languages: English; Swahili
- No. of seasons: 2
- No. of episodes: 16

Production
- Executive producer: Allan Sperling
- Running time: 42-60 minutes
- Production companies: Showmax; Canal+

Original release
- Network: Showmax; Canal+
- Release: 25 February 2021 – 11 April 2022

Related
- Crime and Justice Lagos

Crime and Justice (released on Canal+ as Crime et Justice: Nairobi) is a 2021 Kenyan Showmax Original mystery, crime, and drama series produced by Showmax and Canal+, starring Alfred Munyua, Sarah Hassan, Maqbul Mohammed, Paul Ogola, and Brian Ogola.

== Plot ==
Crime and Justice is a police procedural and legal drama that follows the detective Makena (Hassan) and Silas (Munyua) as they investigate a one-ripped-from-the-headlines case, and safeguard the streets of Nairobi. Dealing with all manner of crime, they must learn to trust each other's instincts in the pursuit of justice.

== Cast ==
- Sarah Hassan as Detective Makena
- Alfred Munyua as Detective Silas
- Maqbul Mohammed as DCI Boss Kebo
- Paul Ogola as Prosecutor Sokoro
- Brian Ogola as Clive
- Nyokabi Macharia

== Episode ==
Season	Episodes	Originally released	
Season	Episodes	First released	Last released
1	8	February 25, 2021	April 26, 2021
2	8	February 21, 2022	April 11, 2022

=== Season 1 (2021) ===
No.	Title	Directed by	Written by	Original release date
1	"Mistress"	Unknown	Unknown	25 February 2021
A wealthy lawyer's pregnant mistress is found murdered; it sends shockwaves throughout the community. Determined to find the killer, Makena and Silas' investigation leads them to a stunning, chilling conclusion.
2	"Primal"	Unknown	Unknown	3 March 2021
When a teenage girl stabs her father to death, Makena and Silas investigate what could have motivated the heinous act. As they look closer into the family, dark secrets of abuse emerge.
3	"Pride"	Unknown	Unknown	8 March 2021
A young mixed couple is found brutally killed at a motel. Makena and Silas’ investigation leads them to the female victim’s family and into the twisted mind of the killer.
4	"Coked"	Unknown	Unknown	16 March 2021
When an Instagram influencer dies under mysterious circumstances on a private jet, the results of her autopsy lead Makena and Silas on the trail of a dangerous drug cartel.
5	"Battered"	Unknown	Unknown	23 March 2021
When a case of domestic violence involves a colleague, Makena and Silas find themselves entangled in a sticky fix between their boss who is trying to prevent a scandal and bringing their colleague to justice.
6	"Homegrown"	Unknown	Unknown	5 April 2021
When a series of bombings terrorize Nairobi, Makena and Silas are led to a charismatic history professor at a local college who may hold the key to stopping the next attack.
7	"Greed"	Unknown	Unknown	12 April 2021
When a journalist gets too close to the truth about the suspicious flow of money at an NGO, he is found murdered. Makena and Silas follow the money to a world of decadence, betrayal and corruption.
8	"Retribution"	Unknown	Unknown	26 April 2021
Makena and Silas investigate the murder of a judge, which leads them to the trail of a serial killer who will seemingly stop at nothing to carry out his twisted sense of justice.

=== Season 2 (2022) ===
No.	Title	Directed by	Written by	Original release date
1	"The Death Squad"	Unknown	Unknown	21 February 2022
A notorious criminal is found murdered. Silas and Makena seek out an anonymous vigilante police cartel, who kill criminals after issuing warnings to them on social media.
2	"The Taxi Killer"	Unknown	Unknown	1 March 2022
Makena and Silas hunt down a serial killer posing as an Uber Driver who targets young, club-going women.
3	"A Killer Date"	Unknown	Unknown	7 March 2022
When a law intern is found dead. Makena and Silas go on a mission to uncover who is behind the murder, only to discover that she was at the wrong place at the wrong time and the hit was for her lover.
4	"Slaughterhouse"	Unknown	Unknown	14 March 2022
When a boy survives a massacre, in which his entire family is murdered, Silas and Makena are shocked to discover a dark truth tied to a popular TV show.
5	"The Death of an Activist"	Unknown	Unknown	21 March 2022
When an Activist is killed in cold blood. Makena and Silas find themselves under pressure from Human rights organizations to bring the killers to book or be seen as collaborators.
6	"The Slaying of an Australian Billionaire"	Unknown	Unknown	28 March 2022
When Makena and Silas investigate a missing tycoon, suspicion quickly falls on his wife. But when they look deeper, they unravel a scheme involving corrupt officials, business rivals, hitmen and more.
7	"The Miracle"	Unknown	Unknown	4 April 2022
Makena and Silas investigate the murder of a nurse which leads them to a string of kidnappings at the maternity ward where she works.
8	"The Whistleblower"	Unknown	Unknown	11 April 2022
Makena and Silas are forced to confront an ugly truth in the force when a series of gang murders leads them back to the death of a trusted colleague.

== Production ==
=== Development ===
On 30 July 2020, Multichoice announced the partnership between Showmax and CANAL+ co-production on Blood Psalms, a drama series set to premiere on Showmax in 2021.

On 12 January 2021, following their partnership, they announced the production of Crime and Justice, a crime series set in Nairobi, directed and produced by Adam Neutzsky-Wulff. Speaking about the production, CEO of MultiChoice Connected Video, Yolisa Phahle, said “MultiChoice was fundamentally an African business invested in telling African stories reflecting in the lives, languages, and cultures of the continent. We believe in African talent and look forward to shining the international spotlight on not only Kenyan stars, but the Kenyan technical industry's capabilities, and we believe that streaming video is a powerful way to deliver these stories. This is one of many more Showmax Originals.”

=== Casting ===
The cast was reported when the first episode for season 1 began, with a line-up of Alfred Munyua, Sarah Hassan, Maqbul Mohammed, Paul Ogola, and Brian Ogola.

Shortly after MultiChoice announce their partnership, the main cast spoke about their role during the press release. Speaking with The Media Online reporter, the lead actors Alfred Munyua, and Sarah Hassan spoke about their characters in the series, Munyua said “When I first read the script, I loved the delivery and realness of Silas as a character. It’s not exaggerated and he’s no Rambo hero; he just tackles his cases the normal way. I found a very real edge with this script, and I hope I’ll do justice to the role”. Hassan spoke about her character, saying “This is a very different character; I’ve never played anything like Makena before. It’s very exciting to get a character that makes me grow as an actor”.

== Release ==
On 1 December 2021, Showmax renewed another season and announced they have officially begun filming. On 11 January 2022, Showmax confirmed the second season, was ready to be released in February. On 17 February 2022, Showmax held a private screening of the first episode of the second season of Crime and Justice.

== Reception ==
=== Critical and audience response ===
In a review, Carlos Mutethi of Quartz Africa said: "Crime and Justice is based on topics that have dominated Kenyan headlines, including femicide and domestic violence." He also added, "[a]long the way, the series exposes bias and other weaknesses in the police and the judicial systems."

=== Awards and nominations ===
Year	Award	Category	Recipient(s)	Result	Ref.
2021	Kalasha Awards	Best TV Drama	Crime and Justice	Nominated	
2021	Kalasha Awards	Best Lead Actress in a TV Drama	Sarah Hassan for Crime and Justice	Won	
