= Shattered (2011 film) =

- Promotional poster
- Directed by: Gilbert Lukalia
- Produced by: Carol Nguta
- Starring: Rita Dominic; Mumbi Maina; Robert Burale
- Distributed by: Dream House Productions
- Release date: 25 November 2011
- Countries: Kenya, Nigeria
- Language: English

Shattered is a 2011 Kenyan film directed by Gilbert Lukalia with Nollywood actress Rita Dominic as Keziah Njema playing the lead role. It won 2 awards at the 2012 Africa Movie Academy Awards. Rita Dominic also won the 2012 best actress award at the Kalasha Film and Television Awards in Kenya.

== Cast ==
- Rita Dominic as Keziah Njema
- Mumbi Maina as Mumbi Miana
- Robert Burale as Frank Njema
- Allan Adika as Jomo
- Eddie Gebhart as Uncle Nick
- Gideon Nzukie as Mike Njema
- Naomi Wambui
- Melvin Alusa
- Ainea Ojiambo
- Janet Sision
