= Anyiko Owoko =

Kenyan music publicist

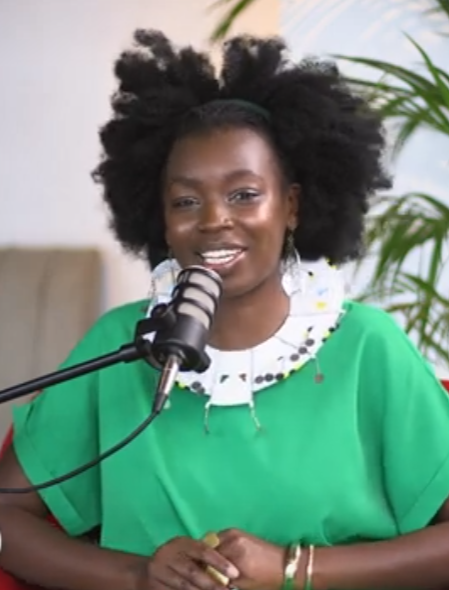
- In a 2023 interview
- Born: Molo, Nakuru County, Kenya
- Education: University of Nairobi
- Years active: 2012–present
- Notable work: Publicist for Sauti Sol and Coke Studio Africa
- Spouse: Tomas Maule (m. 2019)

Anyiko Owoko is a Kenyan entertainment and music publicist. She was the publicist of Sauti Sol and Coke Studio Africa. She was also a music and events curator and an arts and culture writer for Nation Media. In 2018 she was named one of Okay Africa's "100 Women".

== Early life and education ==
Owoko was born and raised in Molo, Kenya. After high school, she moved to Nairobi to attend university. She first took a gap year and studied French at the Alliance Francaise. Anyiko graduated in 2009 from the School of Journalism and Mass Communication (SOJMC) at the University of Nairobi.

== Career ==
From 2012 to 2018, Owoko worked as a publicist for Sauti Sol, a Kenyan Afropop band and one of the country's best-known and longest-lasting musical groups. She first met one of the band members, Willis Chimano, in 2006 when both were studying French at the Alliance Francaise.

From 2015 to 2019, Owoko held the position of Entertainment and Music Publicist for Coke Studio Africa.

== Personal life ==
In 2019, Anyiko married Tomas Maule in a traditional wedding ceremony in Molo, Nakuru County.
