= Veve (film) =

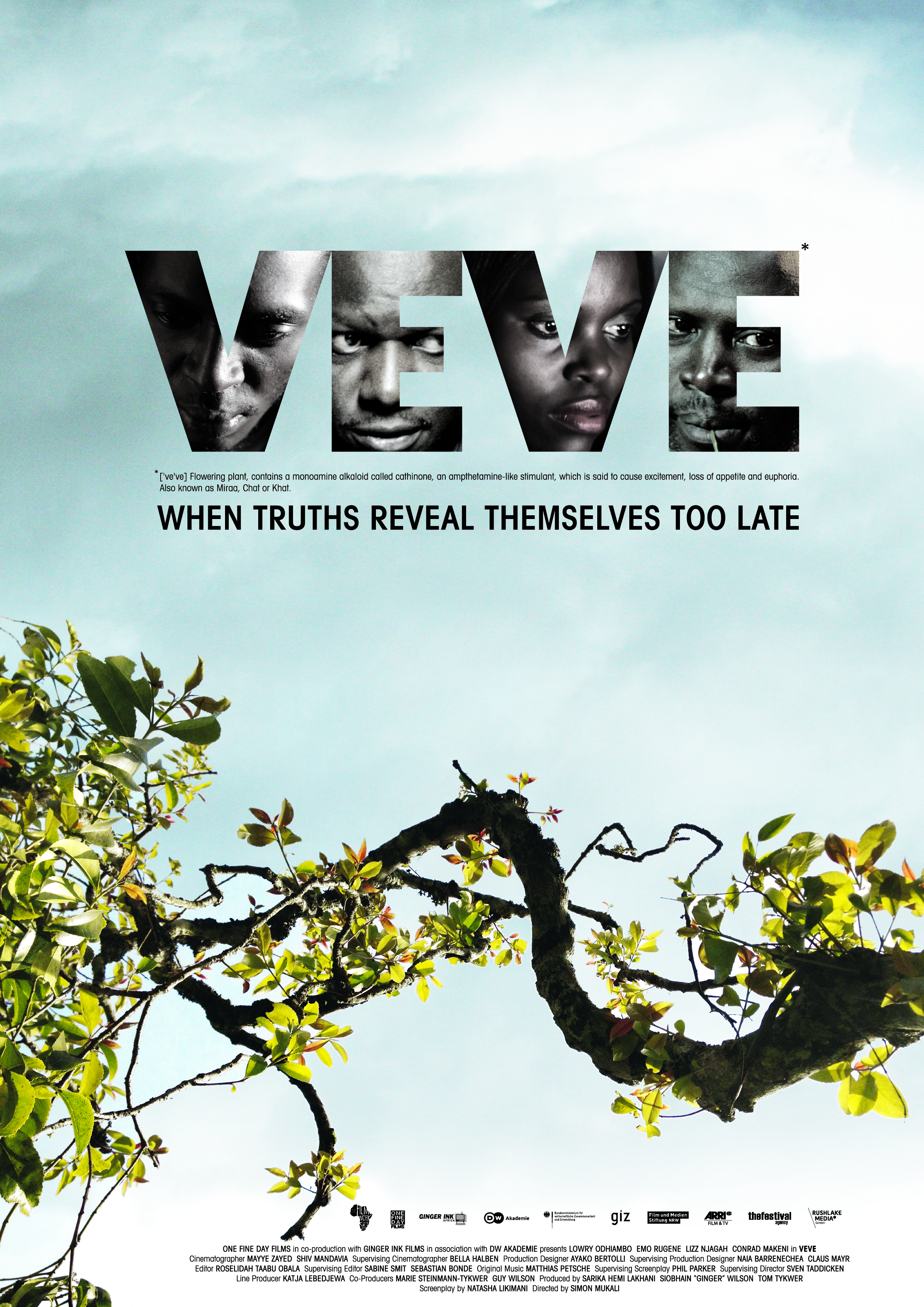
- Movie poster
- Directed by: Simon Mukali
- Written by: Natasha Likimani
- Produced by: Sarika Hemi Lakhani; Tom Tykwer; Ginger Wilson
- Starring: Lowri Odhiambo; Emo Rugene; Lizz Njagah
- Cinematography: Bella Halben; Shiv Mandavia; Mayye Zayed
- Edited by: Roselidah Taabu Yogo
- Music by: Matthias Petsche
- Production companies: One Fine day Films; Ginger Ink Films
- Distributed by: Rushlake Media; Good Movies; Festival Agency
- Release date: 20 July 2014 (Durban Film Festival)
- Running time: 95 min
- Countries: Kenya; Germany
- Languages: Swahili; English
- Budget: €400,000

Veve is a 2014 Kenyan drama film directed by Simon Mukali. VEVE is a co-production of One Fine Day Films and Ginger Ink.

== Plot ==
Amos, an unscrupulous local Member of Parliament, wants to become Maua's governor in the upcoming elections while expanding his business interests. He is a key supplier to the exporter of veve, Wadu, a shrewd businessman who commands a sizable share of the business. Following a conversation with his backdoor accountant, Amos sees an opportunity to upgrade his working relationship with Wadu and acquire a bigger stake in the business. He shares his plan with his right-hand man, Sammy, who has been instrumental in building Amos’ influence, doing the dirty work for him. But Sammy's penchant for such assignments is waning. Still mourning his wife's death despite the passage of a few years, Sammy is struggling to connect as a father with his rebellious, glue-snifing son, Kago.

Amos’ bold plan hits a snag when Wadu brushes off his proposal, driving Amos into taking things by force. He puts in motion a chain of events to drive Wadu out of business. Meanwhile, Veve farmers in Maua who get peanuts for their crop want to better their lot by forming a union, led by the elder Mzee.

Amos's ambition has gradually led to a flagging marriage with his wife Esther, though he does not seem to notice this. Esther enjoys the comfort of the wealth he has but misses out on the affections of a loving man. When she discovers he is sleeping with other women, she does not take it lightly anymore.

Kenzo, an ex-convict, is a bitter man seeking revenge by hunting down the man who killed his father: Amos. He attempts to assassinate Amos at a campaign rally and fails. Undeterred, he seeks the help of fellow ex-convict Julius, and they hatch a multi-pronged plan to attack the business interests of both Wadu and Amos simultaneously, triggering a fatal clash between the two and ultimately destroying Amos.

In a twist of events, Esther's and Kenzo's paths cross, and she ends up finding solace in his arms, totally oblivious that she is falling for her husband's grim reaper. Elsewhere, Wadu suspects that his troubles have something to do with a competitor.

Sammy burns down Mzee's farm as a lesson to the unionists. As Mzee's grandson Morris wonders what to do next, his impulsive friend and wannabe documentary filmmaker Clint tries to confront Amos, which only makes matters worse.

Inevitably, things boil over. Kenzo and Julius raid both Amos's and Wadu's business interests, and Julius pays with his life. Amos hunts down Kenzo as Sammy is torn between obeying his orders and finding his son, who has run away from home. Esther struggles between being faithful to the man she married and saving the man she just met. Wadu's patience runs out after he finds out the source of his troubles, and he hires an assassin to finish off Amos.

== Background ==
Following the success of feature film Soul Boy, One Fine Day Films and Kenyan-based production company Ginger Ink partnered with DW Akademie to design a two-module training initiative: One Fine Day Films Workshops. The first module, a classroom-like "mini film school," opens and expands the skill set and cinematic language of already practicing African filmmakers. It widens cinematic perspectives, exposure, and vocabulary. From 18 to 29 June 2012, the third ONE FINE DAY FILM workshops were in Nairobi, Kenya. 56 participants from eleven African countries were invited to enhance their skills in the fields of directing, production, scriptwriting, editing, sound, production design, and cinematography under the mentorship of experienced film professionals. Out of those participants a creative team from all departments was formed to shoot VEVE nine months later: Simon Mukali from Kenya was selected to direct the movie, mentored by Sven Taddicken. Egyptian participant Mayye Zayed and Kenya's Shiv Mandavia as the cinematographers and many more in various departments—Veve was born. Written by Kenyan scriptwriter Natasha Likimani, it is a high-octane, multi-acter story that gives a glimpse of the contemporary realities within the Khat trade in Kenya.

== Festivals ==
2014

- Durban International Film Festival
- Filmfest Hamburg

== Cast ==
- Emo Rugene as Kenzo
- Lizz Njagah as Esther
- Conrad Makeni as Sammy
- Lowry Odhiambo as Amos
- Adam Peevers as Clint
- Victor Munyua as Morris
- David Wambugu as Kago
- Joseph Peter Mwambia as Mzee
- Delvin Mudigi as Julius
- Albert Nyakundi as Corrupt Policeman
- Philip Mwangi as Bernard
- Fidelis Nyambura as Betty
- Mary Gacheri as Mzee's Wife
- Salim Paul as Amir (Wadu Junior)
- Abubakar Mire as Wadu
- Gerald Langiri as Steve

== Awards and nominations ==
=== Kalasha International Film and TV awards ===
Year	Award	Nominee	Result	Ref
2015	Best Cinematography	Bella Halben Shiv Mandavia Mayye Zayed	Nominated	
2015	Best Picture	Veve	Won	
2015	Best Director	Simon Mukali	Won	

== Reception ==
=== Critical response ===
Damaris Agweyu writing for KenyaBuzz had trouble matching the film to its trailer. She wrote: "More often than not, movies are unable to live up to their incredible trailers. With VEVE, it was the complete opposite; the trailer was unable to live up to the movie. Which, to me, is just plain odd...They underpromised and overdelivered [12].
