= Toto Millionaire =

2007 Kenyan film

- Directed by: Simiyu Barasa
- Screenplay by: Simiyu Barasa
- Starring: Mungai Mbaya; Joseph Kinuthia
- Release date: November 2007
- Running time: 75 minutes
- Country: Kenya
- Language: English

Toto Millionaire is a 2007 Kenyan comedy film written and directed by Simiyu Barasa. The film stars 10 year old Mungai Mbaya in the lead role who plays the role of Toto. The film was premiered at the Goethe Institute Auditorium in Nairobi on 13 November 2007.

== Plot ==
Toto Millionaire film is a simple story of a boy going through problems in life with a sickly mother. But the boy couldn't allow situation hinder him from an opportunity of this life.

== Cast ==
- Mungai Mbaya as Toto
- Joseph Kinuthia as Barry G
- Ainea Ojiambo as Supa

== Synopsis ==
Toto stumbles on a bottle top that carries a prize worth million in a soft drink lottery. When he goes to collect his prize, he faces hurdles from those who try to steal the prize from him due to his age. But the child manages to overcome the challenges he faces and collects his reward.
