= Nana Gichuru =

Kenyan actress

- Born: Ephex Kanana Gichuru; 14 December 1986; Kenya
- Died: 22 September 2015 (aged 28); Along Nairobi Eastern Bypass, Utawala, Nairobi
- Other names: Nana Gichuru Wainaina
- Occupations: Actress; TV host; photographer
- Years active: 2009–15
- Website: nanagichuru.com

Ephex Kanana Gichuru (14 December 1986 – 22 September 2015) was a Kenyan actress and TV host. She was popularly known as Nana Gichuru. As an actress she was known for her roles in television series Noose of Gold, Demigods and How to Find a Husband. As a host, she was to present Interior Designs, a Kenyan reality series, prior to her death. She was also a crew member for Kenya Airways. She had been married to Richard Wainaina just before her death.

== Career ==
Gichuru starred in several productions like Noose of Gold in 2010 and Demigods in 2011. Her latest production was a role in the comedy How to Find a Husband and the reality show Interior Designs

== Death ==
At approximately 10am on 22 September 2015, Nana was travelling in her BMW convertible on Eastern Bypass, Utawala, when her car rammed into a truck. She died on the spot. She died at the age of 28. Her death came ten days after she reportedly predicted her own death in her social media pages. Her memorial service was held on 30 September 2015 in Ruaraka Methodist Church. She was buried on 2 October 2015 in her hometown, Kaaga in Meru.

== Filmography ==
Year	Title	Role	Notes	Network
2008	Sommer	Claire	TV Series - 1 episode	
2010–	Noose of Gold	Felma	Main cast TV Series - 1 episode	NTV
2011–12	Demigods	Juliana	Main cast	NTV
2015	How to Find a Husband	Sylvia	Main cast TV Series - 1 episode	Maisha Magic East
2015	Interior Designs	Host	Pre-intended host, but she died before the premiere.	NTV
