= Phoenix Players =

African repertory theatre company

Phoenix Players was the largest and oldest repertory theatre company in East and Central Africa. Situated in Nairobi, Kenya it was registered in 1983 as a non-profit making company limited by guarantee. The theatre was opened following the closure of the Donovan Maule Theatre, which was founded in 1958 by Donovan Maule and his wife Mollie. The DM, as the Donovan Maule theatre was generally known, officially closed in 1984, amid rising costs and limited audiences. Aware of the theatre's likely fate, a core of its repertory actors, led by James Falkland, who had taken over the management of the DM in 1979, were determined to ensure that repertory theatre in Kenya did not die. The founders of Phoenix were Falkland, his wife Debonnaire, James Ward, who had previously been a children's show host in Britain, and Kenneth Mason, MBE, who, like Falkland, had served in the Royal Air Force during the Second World War.

Falkland and his team sustained a year-round repertory schedule and produced an annual musical, complete with a pocket orchestra, maintaining an impressive level of quality. Phoenix Players mounted, on average, a new play every three weeks throughout the year. Their 120-seat auditorium was located in the Professional Centre on Parliament Road, just across the road from where the Donovan Maule Theatre, now demolished once stood. While initially the majority of plays were dominated by mostly white, mostly British casts, Falkland slowly began to train and introduce more black Kenyan actors, among them Lupita Nyong'o, who won an Academy Award in 2012 for her performance in 12 Years a Slave.

Falkland's death in 2007 marked the beginning of the theatre's decline. Mason had died three years earlier, while Ward and Falkland's ex-wife, Debonnaire, had left the theatre to pursue careers elsewhere. A talented group of black Kenyan actors tried valiantly to keep the theatre going, but with audiences dwindling, the theatre struggled to make ends meet.

Phoenix, named because it had risen from the ashes of the DM, closed its doors for the last time in April 2017 following what was described as a long period of debt, neglect and management infighting.

== Sources ==
- The EastAfrican, February 26, 2007: Death of Kenyan theatre's 'grandfather'
- The New York Times, July 13,1984: 2 Cultures Share the Stage in Africa
- Business Daily, July 31, 2014: Phoenix Players Lifts Actors from Theatre Stage to Stardom
- Barrack Muluka, 27 April 2017: Is this the final act by Phoenix?
