= Brian Ogola =

Kenyan actor (born 1989)

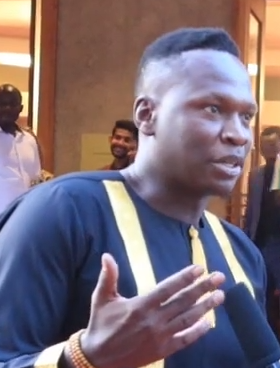
- Ogola in 2023
- Born: Brian Omondi Ogola Genard; December 8, 1989 (age 36); Nairobi, Kenya
- Occupation: Actor
- Years active: 2012–present

Brian Omondi Ogola Genard, credited as Brian Ogola (born December 8, 1939), is a Kenyan film, television and stage actor. Since 2012 he has played roles in television shows, such as Jane and Abel, and in films such as Kati Kati, Lusala, Neophobia, and Poacher which was the first Kenyan film to premiere on Netflix.

== Early life ==
Ogola was born in December 8, 1989 and raised in Kenya's capital, Nairobi, the son of George Josia Ogola Osele (1948–2021). He attended Unity Primary School and later St. Mary’s School, Yala, where he completed his high school education and became interested in theatre. He performed in church plays and musicals around the city from 2009. Ogola took business courses at the Technical University of Kenya from 2010 and then at Kenya Institute of Management, but left to pursue acting full time in 2013.

== Career ==
In 2012 under the coaching of David Morin of Slingshot Productions, Ogola won an "actors monologue challenge". He made appearances in local tv shows such as Mwangaza, Love 101 on KTN, Block D and Lies That Bind (2013). In 2014, he joined the soap opera Jane and Abel as leading man Abel Simba.

In 2015, he starred as Anto in the movie Kati Kati, which won 6 awards at the 2017 Kalasha Awards, as well as the 2017 Minneapolis–Saint Paul International Film Festival's Emerging Filmmaker Award and Best Movie (East Africa) at the 2017 Africa Magic Viewers' Choice Awards.

In 2017, he starred in the short film Neophobia, the only African movie chosen for the 70th Cannes Film Festival. He was nominated for best film supporting actor at the East African Riverwood Awards for his role in the movie. The same year, he appeared in the Too Early for Birds historical plays, based on the blog Owaahh and as Mark in the film 18 Hours written and directed by Njue Kevin.

In 2018, Ogola played Mutua in the Netflix short film Poacher. The film was selected as a finalist at the Hollywood #Just4Shorts festival and was also selected to screen at the World of Film International Festival Glasgow'2018. The same year he appeared in the film Lusala. He also appeared in the films Selina and Crime and Justice.

In 2022, he starred in the new play Speak their Names by Sylvia Cassini at venues in Nairobi.

== Filmography ==
=== Television ===
Year	Project	Role	Notes	Ref
2010	Love101		Cast	
2013	Poison Ivy	Chris	Theatrical performance	
2011-14	Lies that Bind	Ben Juma #2	Series regular; Replaced Maqbul Mohammed during the series' run	
2013 - 2015	Jane and Abel	Abel Simba	Protagonist	
2019	The System	Chimano	Cast	
2019 - 2021	Pieces of Us	Richard	Cast	
2021 - 2022	Crime and Justice	Clive	Cast, 14 episodes	
2023	Second Family		Cast	

=== Film ===
Year	Project	Role	Notes
2018	Lusala		Cast
2018	Poacher	Mutua	Cast, Short film
2017	18 Hours	Mark	Cast
2016	Kati Kati	Anto	Cast
2014	Double Trouble	Major	Cast
2017	Neophobia	Dr. Adam Akunga	Cast, Short film
2017	Project Revenge		Cast
2018	Disconnect	Richard	Cast
2019	Lusala	Lusala	Cast
2020	Cheque Mate	Zubedi	Cast
2021	Taliya	Jabari	Cast
2021	Mission to Rescue	ATPU Officer #1	Cast
2021	Hynagogia	Chroistopher Bakari	Cast, Short film
2022	Chaguo	Kowa	Cast
2022	Disconnect: The Wedding Planner	Richard	Cast
2025	Goat		Cast, Short film
