= Dorothy Ghettuba =

Kenyan film maker and TV entrepreneur

Dorothy Ghettuba-Pala
- Born: 1979 (age 46–47); Kenya
- Education: Andrews University, Michigan
- Occupations: Screenwriter, Producer, Film and TV Entrepreneur
- Organization: SpielWorks Media
- Notable work: Lies that Bind
- Spouse: Oyunga Pala

Dorothy Ghettuba (born 1979) is a Kenyan Film and TV entrepreneur. She is currently the Director, Original Series for Africa at Netflix She is a co-founder of the Nairobi-based Spielworks Media, an African production company launched in 2009. In 2016, she was named among C. Hub magazine's 100 most influential creative personalities. She is also a 2016 Archbishop Tutu Fellow with the African Leadership Institute.

== Biography ==
Born and raised in Kenya, Ghettuba studied communications and political science at Andrews University in Michigan, United States. After her graduation, she spent several years living in Canada, where she worked for a period with a venture capital fund. She returned to Kenya shortly after her thirtieth birthday. Ghettuba claims that her original passion was acting, but when she was not selected for roles, she turned to the production side of filmmaking.

She quit her job at a venture capital firm in Canada to pursue her passion in filmmaking. Gettuba-Pala joined a local TV show as a producer before moving on to establish Spielworks Media, a local entertainment production and content creation company for television and digital platforms operating in East and Central Africa. Ghettuba-Pala is also the co-founder of Keja TV, a social media channel on Facebook and YouTube. Ghettuba-Pala is dedicated to developing creative talent and quality talent and as such has won many accolades for 18 television shows, 20 web shows and over 40 movies. Some of her renown projects include a popular Kiswahili TV show, Penzi la Sumu. Other films that she has produced are Lies that Bind, Saints and Higher Learning. The film mogul landed a job at Netflix as manager international originals in March 2019 and was also appointed by the Kenyan government as chairperson Kenya Film Commission Board in May 2019. Ghettuba Pala is married to a Kenyan journalist Oyunga.

=== Spielworks Media ===
She launched Spielworks Media in 2009. She claims that her dream is to turn the company into an African version of the US motion picture studio Universal Pictures.

== Filmography ==
| Year | Title | Role | Category | Number of episodes |
|---|---|---|---|---|
| 2009 | The Agency | Producer | TV Series | 4 |
| 2009 | Block-D | Producer Screenwriter | TV Series | 1 |
| 2010 | 'Know Your Constitution': Kenya Referendum | Producer Screenwriter | Documentary | - |
| 2010 | Higher Learning | Producer Screenwriter | TV Series | - |
| 2011 | Saints | Producer Screenwriter | TV Series | - |
| 2011 - 2014 | Lies That Bind | Producer Screenwriter | TV Series | 118 |
| 2013 - 2015 | Jane & Abel | Producer | TV Series | - |
| 2014 | Rispa | Producer | TV Series | - |
| 2015 | Sumu la Penzi | Producer | TV Series | 99 |
