= Lies that Bind =

- Genre: Soap opera
- Created by: Dorothy Ghettuba
- Written by: Abigail Arunga
- Directed by: Simiyu Barasa
- Starring: Lucy Nyagah; Ruth Maingi; Florence Nduta; Justin Mirichii; Tom Osongo; Irene Ayimba
- Theme music composer: Dan Kiundi
- Country of origin: Kenya
- Original languages: English; Swahili
- No. of episodes: 118

Production
- Executive producer: Dorothy Ghettuba
- Production location: Nairobi
- Editors: Mercy Muriuki; Ambrose Muindi; Reg Chuhi; Ireri Mirito
- Camera setup: Single-camera
- Running time: 22—27 minutes
- Production company: Spielworks Media Ltd

Original release
- Network: KTN
- Release: 24 November 2011

Lies that Bind is a Kenyan television soap opera that premiered in November 2011 on the network KTN. It mainly features themes like polygamy, greed, lust, power and contemporary issues that affect families.

== Overview ==
Lies that Bind is a Kenyan drama series that revolves around the wealthy Juma family. It mainly majors in how the love for money can destroy a family. When the head of the family, Mr. Juma, dies of a cardiac arrest, his three wives and their children, together with his conniving brother, begin to fight over who gets to inherit the vast fortune left behind.

== Cast ==
=== Main ===
- Lucy Nyaga portrays Joyce, a good wife, the kind that will stand with a man through thick and thin, helping him build his empire. She is one that commands respect from people around her. She has a daughter named Esther.
- Ruth Maingi as Salome, the third wife and Richard Juma's true love She is calm and a good wife and mother. She is very soft and kind. Others like Edith treat her kindness as a weakness. She has two kids, Patricia and Allan.
- Florence Nduta as Edith, the second wife and the center of all the chaos. She is the second wife. She is extremely malicious, greedy and wants all the fortune to herself. She doesn't care who she steps on. All she wants is the rest of the family to give up on all the fortune so that she remains in the spotlight. She is also overprotective toward her son Joseph (Justin Mirichii), as she expects him to take over her late husband's empire.
- Justin Mirichii as Joseph, he is a grown man but still a mama's boy. He is lazy, undisciplined and a drunkard. He is the kind that waits for his mother to fight for what he believes belongs to him. His mother is the one that fights for him, and fight she does. When Joseph is not fighting the rest of the family with his mother, he drinks.
- Tom Osongo as John Juma, a manipulative and calculating brother of Richard Juma. He has always been envious of his late brother. He has a great ambition of becoming a Member of Parliament. As his character suggests, he plays the savior, yet he is the villain.
- Irene Ayimba as Esther, she is the CEO of RJ Investments. She is generally independent. She is still a bachelorette despite being the eldest on the Jumas clan.
- Maureen Koech as Patricia, on the other hand, is the bubbly young girl in the family who is on a journey of self-discovery. She is experimental, a typical school girl trying to find her way in a world marred by family drama.

=== Supporting ===
- Lenana Kariba as Joseph Juma
- Maqbul Mohammed as Ben Juma #1
- Joseph Thuo as Allan
- Alan Oyugi
- Eclay Wangira as Tabitha
- Charlie Karumi
- Oyondi Lawrence
- Dantez Mwenda
- Maureen Obae
- May Wairimu
- Stella Mungai
- Olympia Owira
- Naomi Ng'ang'a as Mama Sweetie
- Joseph Omari as Richard Juma
- Brian Ogola as Ben Juma #2
- Bilal Wanjau

== Release ==
Lies that Bind premiered in Kenya at KTN on November 24, 2011. It shared same timeslot with rival soap opera Mali.

TV season	Timeslot (EAT)	No. of episodes	Premiered		Ended	
TV season	Timeslot (EAT)	No. of episodes	Date	Premiere Ratings	Date	Finale Ratings
2011–14	Thursdays 8:30PM		November 24, 2011	20.5		—N/a

Beside airing in Kenya, it premiered in Africa on Africa Magic Entertainment on weekdays at 6:30 PM CAT. Also on Africa Magic and Africa Magic World on different daily slots and different time slots. It as also been broadcast on Urban TV in Uganda, MUVI TV in Zambia, OH TV in Ghana, SBC in Seychelles, NBC in Namibia and SABC in South Africa.

== Awards and nominations ==
Year	Ceremony	Awardee	Award	Result	Ref.
2012	Kalsha Awards	Lies that Bind	Best Television Drama	Won	
2012	Kalsha Awards	Florence Nduta	Best Lead Actress in Drama	Won	
2012	Kalsha Awards	Lucy Nyaga	Best Lead Actress in Drama	Nominated	
2012	Kalsha Awards	Justin Mirichii	Best Supporting Actor in Drama	Won	
2013	Africa Magic Viewers Choice Awards	Maureen Koech	Best Supporting Actress in Drama	Won	
2013	Africa Magic Viewers Choice Awards	Carol Mbugua	Best Art Director	Nominated	
2013	Africa Magic Viewers Choice Awards	Reg Chuhi and Kevin Ireri	Best Picture Editor	Nominated	
2014	Kalasha awards	Maqbul Mohammed	Best Supporting Actor	Nominated	
