= Raymond Ofula =

Kenyan actor

Raymond Ofula is a Kenyan actor. He has been in the film industry for over 40 years. and he has featured in both local and international films.

== Career ==
He has appeared in such films as To Walk with Lions (1999), Lara Croft: Tomb Raider – The Cradle of Life (2003), The White Masai (2005), Winterreise (2006) and The Boy Who Harnessed the Wind (2019). He has also appeared in the Netflix show Queen Sono. Raymond is also a talent Judge helping shape upcoming talented actors together with other seasoned actors like Naomi Nga'nga in an acting reality tv show by Startimes Kenya dubbed as the next superstar Ofula was married to Anne Ofula who was a veteran journalist and TV/radio presenter at Kenya Broadcasting Corporation until her death in 2008.
