= Sumu la Penzi =

Television series

- Genre: Drama; Romance; Soap opera
- Written by: Mwende Ngao
- Directed by: Carol Odongo
- Starring: Serah Ndanu; Naomi Ng'ang'a; Avril Nyambura; Joyce Maina
- Theme music composer: Dan Aceda
- Opening theme: "Safari"
- Ending theme: "Safari"
- Composer: Dan Aceda
- Country of origin: Kenya
- Original languages: Swahili; English
- No. of seasons: 4

Production
- Executive producer: Dorothy Ghettuba
- Production location: Nairobi
- Editor: Reg Chuhi Ireri Miriti
- Camera setup: Multi-camera setup
- Running time: 24 minutes
- Production company: Spielswork Media

Original release
- Network: Syndication
- Release: 17 September 2013

Sumu la Penzi is a Kenyan Swahili melodrama that premiered in 2013 on Africa Magic Swahili. It stars Serah Ndanu, Joyce Maina, Naomi Ng'ang'a and Judith Nyambura.

== Synopsis ==
Sumu la Penzi follows the life of three urban women, their misfortunes, and their adventures as they prey on high-flying men of the city to finance their expensive lifestyles. These women, Mariam, Eva and Tindi trawl on social gatherings, bars and even their friends’ workplaces with their feminine charms, often scoring ridiculously rich married men of the city. The central character, Mariam, is the elegant, classy go-getter who is dating three men at a go. She is the envy of every girl in town, a master of the game who is living the dream life. Her best friend is Eva, a banker who is dating a married man, with whom she has a daughter. She is drowning in delusions, believing that the man is in love with her and will leave his wife for her. Amidst all this is Mariam's cousin, a recent electrical engineering graduate whose efforts to score a job have hit a dead end. Mentoring these girls in their pursuits is Ama, a bar manager at their favourite joint.

== Cast ==
=== Main ===
- Serah Ndanu as Mariam
- Naomi Ng'ang'a as Ama
- Avril as Eva
- Joyce Maina as Tindi

=== Supporting ===
- Davidson Ngibuini as Tash
- Pieter Desloovere as Hans
- Peter Kawa as Oscar
- Norbert Ouma as Solomon
- Peterson Gathambo as Martin
- Bilal Ndegwa as Mr Rent
- Sherylene Mungai as Debrah
- Lucy Waigera as Olive
- Nina Adegala as Cynthia
- Ainea Ojiambo as Victor

=== Guests ===
- Antony Makau as business partner

== Production ==
The show was produced by, Dorothy Ghettuba, the producer of Lies that Bind. Both television series, were produced by Spielswork media.

== Marketing and release ==
The official trailer was released on 26 August 2014.

Sumu la penzi aired on 17 September 2013 in Africa Magic Swahili following its premiere on 16 September 2013. It also aired on Maisha Magic Swahili. It is also aired on StarTimes Swahili every weeknight at 18:30 EAT.

== Awards and nominations ==
Year	Ceremony	Category	Nominee	Result	Ref.
2014	Kalasha Awards	Best TV Drama	Sumu la Penzi	Nominated	
