= House of Lungula =

- Directed by: Alexandros Konstantaras
- Written by: Lizz Njagah; Alexandros Konstantaras
- Produced by: Lizz Njagah
- Starring: Lizz Njagah; Gerald Langiri; Ian Mbugua; Sarah Hassan; Lenana Kariba
- Cinematography: John Wambugu
- Edited by: Alexandros Konstantaras; Aggie Nyagari
- Music by: Ni Sisi Band
- Production company: Historia Films
- Release date: 21 November 2013
- Running time: 77 mins
- Country: Kenya
- Languages: English; Swahili

House of Lungula is a 2013 Kenyan comedy film directed by Alexandros Konstantaras. It focuses on the sex life of typical Kenyans.The word "lungula" means "sex" in Kenyan slang, Sheng. The film stars Gerald Langiri, Lizz Njagah and Ian Mbugua.

Langiri plays a hardworking man who needs money to pay for his fiancé's dowry, while Njagah plays a wife who decides to play a tit-for-tat game when she finds out that her husband had a mistress. Mbugua plays a man who maintains a secret relationship with a younger woman, played by Sarah Hassan, who in turn represents girls who date older men for money.

The film was rated 18+ by the Kenya Film Board Association.

== Plot ==
Harrison (Gerald Langiri) urgently requires money to pay for the dowry of his fiancée, Charity (Nice Githinji). Through his boss, Mr. Taylor (Ian Mbugua), he gains access to a huge house belonging to their company's CEO, Mr. Lungula. He is charged with cleaning the house for a fee. A posh empty house presents an opportunity and under the right circumstances could generate some quick cash. Alex (Lenana Kariba), Harrison's friend and co-worker, is looking for a place to entertain a 'client' for a day. For the right fee, he gains access to the house of Lungula, but with conditions. Mr. and Mrs. Taylor's (Lizz Njagah) marriage is rocky, and she has suspicions that her husband is cheating. Sahara (Helena Waithera) provides a solution, an eye for an eye. To be fair, these suspicions are not entirely unfounded as Mr. Taylor is a very naughty man, slinging around the beautiful Chichi (Sarah Hassan) while he's supposed to be at the office. Chichi on the other hand also has a lover, Tito (Gitau Ngogoyo), to make the plot even more complex. Surprisingly all the characters land at the house of Lungula. The secrets are revealed and relationships are at stake.

== Cast ==
- Lizz Njagah as Lola Taylor
- Gerald Langiri as Harrisson Hamisi
- Ian Mbugua as Chris Taylor
- Lenana Kariba as Alex Kijani
- Sarah Hassan as Chichi
- Nice Githinji as Charity
- Gitau Ngogoyo as Titus "Tito"
- Helena Waithera as Sahara
- Lydia Nyambura as Lydia
- Diana Nekoye Sifuna as Diana
- Sheila Kwamboka as Cop

== Music ==
House of Lungula featured a number of musical works that were mainly by Kenyan artists. Ni Sisi Band performed "(Give it all to me) House of Lungula", which was the main soundtrack for the film. The film also featured Chuom 32 alongside Doreen Nyawira performing "House of Lungula OST."

== Reception ==
House of Lungula generally received positive reviews among youths and the younger generation in Kenya due to its humour. It was awarded 11 nominations in the 2014 Kalasha Awards. It won the Best Script award.

== Awards ==
Year	Awarding organization	Category	Nominee	Result	REF
2013	Kalasha International Film and TV Awards	Best Movie	House of Lungula	Won	
2013	Kalasha International Film and TV Awards	Best Supporting Actress	Sarah Hassan	Won	
2014	Kalasha International Film and TV Awards	Best Supporting Actress	Sarah Hassan	Nominated	
2014	Kalasha International Film and TV Awards	Best Lead Actor Film	Gerald Langiri	Nominated	
2014	Kalasha International Film and TV Awards	Best Picture	House of Lungula	Nominated	
