= Maureen Koech =

Kenyan actress, songwriter and singer (born 1989)

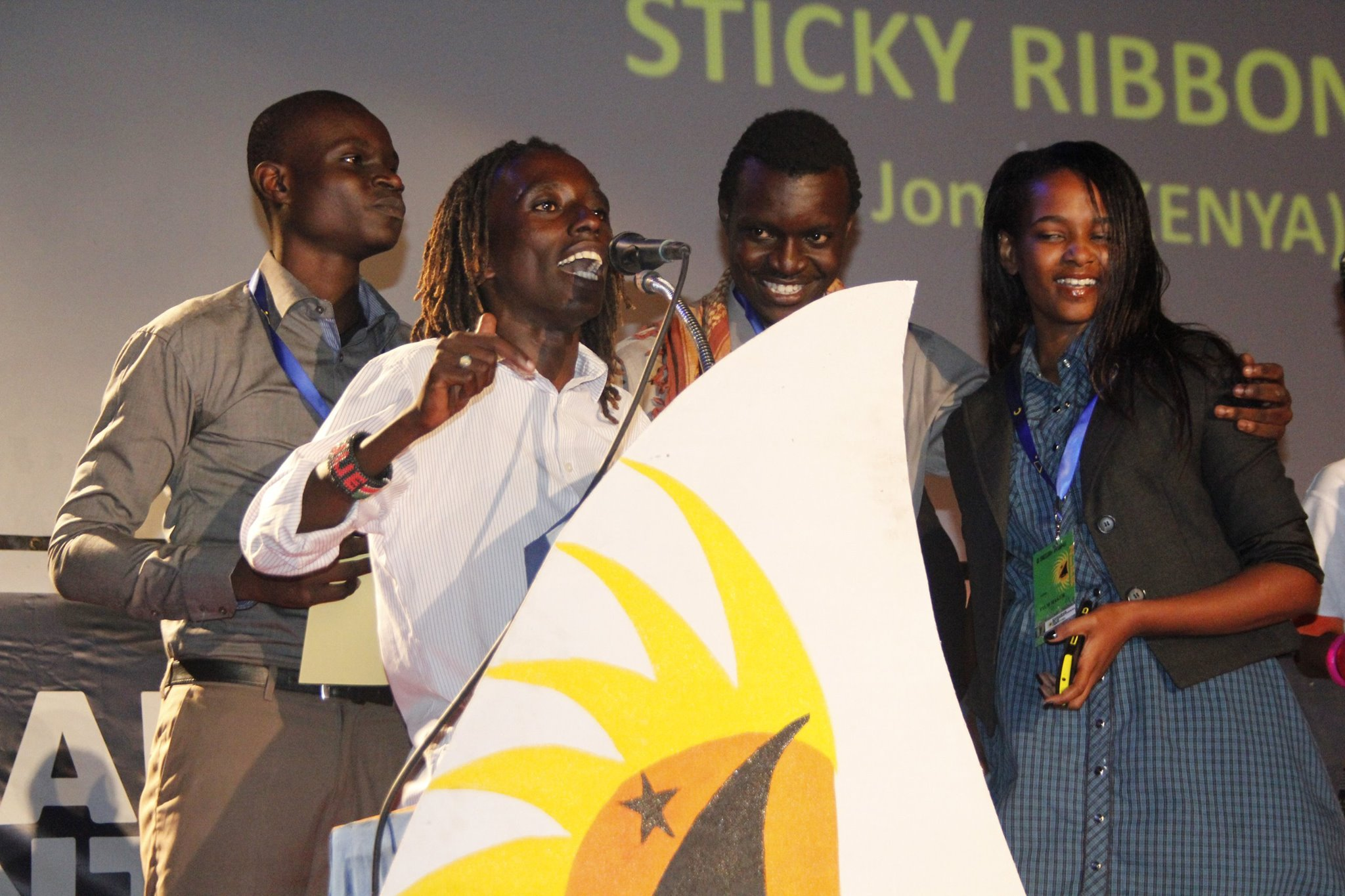
- Koech (far right) while receiving the prize at the Zanzibar International film festival in 2014, with Bill Afwani, Njue Kevin and Brian Achar
- Born: 21 May 1989 (age 37); Nairobi, Kenya
- Education: Strathmore University
- Occupations: singer; actress; songwriter; entertainer
- Years active: 2010–present
- Musical career
- Genres: Afropop; R&B

Maureen Koech (born 21 May 1989) is a Kenyan actress, songwriter and singer. She appears in the KTN's Lies that Bind.

== Early life and education ==
Maureen Koech was born on May 21, 1989. Raised in Nairobi, she went to Nakuru High School. She later joined Strathmore University between 2009 and 2013, where she enrolled in Business Information and Technology (BBIT) and later ventured into acting.

== Career ==
=== Early career beginnings; Strathmore University, Changing Times ===
Koech began her acting career doing stage performances at the Alliance Française. Aside from featuring in a number of productions, she starred in Lies that Bind, a Kenyan TV drama series that won the award for best TV series at the 2012 Kalasha film and television awards. At Strathmore University, she joined Drama School (DRAMSCO), where she participated in drama activities. She made her debut in campus television series Changing Times back in 2010, where she played Shiks. She worked with Ian Mugoya, Nice Githinji, Kevin Ndege and the rest of the ensemble cast.

=== 2011–2014; Lies that Bind ===
In 2011, she auditioned at the Kenya National Theatre and was picked as one of the main cast for the soap opera Lies that Bind. She played Patricia, a young bubbly girl who is in the process of rediscovering herself. Her performance in the show earned her the Best Supporting Actress in the Africa Magic Viewers Choice Award in 2013. In 2014, she featured in a short film, Sticking Ribbons.

=== Music career ===
Apart from being an actress, she has also ventured into the music industry. She recorded her first demo after high school, then took a break from music to discover herself as a musician. She does urban pop and has one single under her stage name Mokko. She plays guitar. She released her first single, "No Letting", in 2014.

== Filmography ==
=== Television ===
Year	Project	Role	Notes
2010	Changing Times	Shiks	10 episodes
2011–2014	Lies that Bind	Patricia	Series regular: Won—2013 Africa Magic Viewers Choice Awards for Best supporting actress in drama
2014	Sticking Ribbons		Short film
2019	Ol-Enaibon		Short film
2019	Family Meeting	Alison	
2021	The Extremities	Dole	TV Mini Series
2023	Rise of the Phoenix		
2023	Lia		
2023	My Last Christmas	Emma	Short film

== Discography ==
=== Singles ===
Year	Title	Album
2014	"Be afraid"	TBA
