= Makutano Junction =

- Genre: Drama; Soap opera
- Written by: Philip Luswata; Naomi Kamau; Natasha Likimani; Charles Ouda; Wanjiru Kairu; Damaris Irungu; Morrison Mwadulo; Charles Ouda; Patrick Serro; Joanne Carpenter
- Screenplay by: Philip Luswata; Wanjiru Kairu; Damaris Irungu; Charles Ouda; Patrick Serro; Natasha Likimani; Simiyu Barasa; Patrick Serro
- Directed by: Andrew Gosling; Mary Migui; Salome Kinyanjui; Shani Grewal; Derrick Omfwoko Aswani
- Starring: Lizz Njagah; Maqbul Mohammed; Peter King; Regina Rè; Raymond Ofula; Joseph Omari; Emily Wanja; Charles Ouda; Naomi Kamau; Angela Ndambuki; Onyango Owino; Patrick Serro; Tonny Njuguna; Philip Luswata; Carol Midimo; Ken Ambani; Damaris Irungu; Raymond Ofula; Wanja Mworia; Janet Kirina
- Theme music composer: Simon Brint; Tom Dyson
- Composer: Simon Brint
- Country of origin: Kenya
- Original languages: English; Kiswahili
- No. of series: 15
- No. of episodes: 191 (list of episodes)

Production
- Executive producers: David Campbell; Naomi Kamau
- Producer: Benedict Boyd
- Production locations: Nairobi; Kenya
- Cinematography: Sammy Maina
- Editors: Louiza Wanjiku Makbul; Mercy Muriuki; Esther Kintu; Wanjugu Ndirangu
- Camera setup: Multi-camera setup
- Running time: 30 minutes
- Production company: Mediae Production Company

Original release
- Network: KBC (former); Citizen TV
- Release: 2007 – <2015

Makutano Junction is a Kenyan soap opera that premiered in 2007. It captures different themes that affect the normal African society. The main contemporary issues that are mostly stressed in the drama are corruption, education, early marriages, female genital mutilation and pregnancies, HIV/AIDS, human rights, social justice, values and perceptions, and conflict resolution. The story is set in a fictional village named Makutano and has an ensemble cast.

== Premise ==
Makutano Junction spans through different families in Makutano Village. For every normal village there must be a saga. Hence, Makutano Village may not be out of the norm. Cases such as corruption, health issues, empowerment of women, and domestic violence are common in most parts of developing nations, thus ways of tackling such cases are showcased in the story. For instance, one gets to meet a select group of family members like The Mabukis, who are headed by Winston Mabuki. He is a respectable man in his mid sixties. Married to an ambitious woman, Priscilla, they have one son, Karis who has a daughter (a product of their teenage romance) with Hope Baraka but never got married, an ex-convict that demands fear from the rest of the village. The series also features a family that have members suffering from HIV/AIDS. HIV/AIDS is mainly showcased by Margaret, who does not hide her status and lives a normal life without infecting her loving husband, Matano, the Makutano chief. They even conceive a daughter who is born healthy. It is The Okodis, in which Mama Mboga has to fight stigmatization and endure the abuse she receives from her husband Erasmus Okodi. The story also features political ventures of various characters and the challenges they face especially women. At one point, Hope Baraka vies for parliamentary elections, where she faces discrimination among men and conservative members of society. Moreover, family and marital problems are also depicted in the storyline. For example, Hannington Baraka shares a very distant relationship with his youngest son Philip, who only seeks for his father to look at his good side and support his decisions no matter how rushed they are sometimes. Love is also represented in the show, for instance, the great love that Philip has for Red.

== Cast ==
=== The Mabukis ===
- Raymond Ofula as Winston Mabuki
- Mukami Njiru as Priscilla Mabuki
- Maqbul Mohammed as Karis
- Alfred Munyua as Vincent Mabuki
- Ainea Ojiambo as Snake

=== The Barakas ===
- Joseph Omari as Hannington Baraka
- Margaret Aketch as Bernadette Baraka
- Onyango Owino as Maspeedy
- Regina Re as Hope Baraka
- Charles Ouda as Philip Baraka
- Patricia Kihoro as Diana Baraka
- Mungai Mbaya as Brian Baraka

=== The Mulanis ===
- Jim Were as Jonathan Mulani
- Salome Kinyanjui as Rose Mulani
- Beatrice Wangechi as Kara Mulani
- Emily Wanja as Red Mulani
- Kamau Mbaya as Tobby Mulani

=== The Mukaras ===
- Uncornfirmed actor as Leonard
- Lizz Njagah as Nancy Mukara
- Angela Ndambuki as Nancy #2 (Season 2)
- Peter Nzioki as Albert Mukara

=== The Okodis ===
- Naomi Kamau as Mama Mboga
- Cajetan Boy as Erasmus Okodi
- Uncornfirmed actor as Peggy Okodi
- Uncornfirmed actor as Mari Okodi
  - Uncornfirmed actor as Baby Joni Okodi

=== Barbers and Hairdressers ===
==== Barbers ====
- Frobisher Lwanga as Dodgy D
- Abubakar Mwenda as Bill
- Jeff Shigoli as Ben

==== The Matanos ====
- Philip Luswata as Matano
- Caroline Midimo as Margaret
- Asha Mwikali as Everlyn

==== Hairdressers ====
- Lucia Shikuku as "Big" Sharon
- Wanjiku Mburu as "Small" Sharon
- Wanja Mworia as Toni
- Janet Kirina as Florence

==== The Matendecheres ====
- Morrison Mwadulo as Josiah
- Louisa Sialo as Ana
- Pascal Tokodi as Thomas
- Triza Kabue as Lena

=== Others ===
- Damaris Irungu as Pendo
- Tonny Njuguna as Dr. Charles
- Patrick Serro as Washington
- Charles Bukeko as Matata
- Lucy Njoroge as Bettina
- Katherine Damaris as Mama Pima
- Natasha Likimani as Catherine A.K.A Kate
- Joed Ngaruiya as Shani
- Ngwatilo Mawiyoo as Lilian
- Isaac Muwawu as Joseph Matata
- Nungari Kang'ethe as Mrs. Matata
- Mbeki Mwalimu as Dr. Hannah Wasali
- Justin Mirichii as Elvis Kipmau
- Joan Samia as Stella
- Henry Njenga as Henri Drani
- Malcolm Mwakazi as Steve
- Kenneth Ambani as Shaka
- Gloria Moraa as Yvonne
- Faith Nyanga as Letisha
- Gitura Kamau as K.K
- Samantha Wanjiru as Peninah
- Allan Weku as Frankie
- Irene Kariuki as Mercy
- Diana Kamau as Hellen
- Lucia Shikuku as Cheryl

== Production ==
The show is produced by David Campbell and Naomi Kamau. The TV show has had different directors and writers who dedicate themselves to different episodes and seasons. The first director was Andrew Gosling. Shani Grewal directed 39 episodes of the show. Mary Migui, Salome Kinyanjui and Omfwoko Aswani were also directors at some point in the television series. Philip Luswata, also playing a main role in the teledrama, is the primary scriptwriter. Other writers were Morrison Mwadulo, Natasha Likimani, Charles Ouda, Damaris Irungu, Patrick Serro and Wanjiru Kairu. Official production of this television series was started in 2006.

=== Filming ===
The first nine seasons were shot in standard and were framed at 4:3 aspect ratio. Subsequent seasons have had 16:9 widescreen. Each season is set to have 13 episodes each. The first season was released in the same year, and issues such as human rights, social justice, values and perceptions, conflict resolution, sustainable development, and interdependency, among others, were showcased. In series two of Makutano, living with HIV/AIDS social justice were the key issues. In the third season, human rights, diversity values, and perceptions were the key issues that were put into play. The fourth season—which ran for the usual 13-episode run—had all the previous themes combined with one key issue that was included women leadership and the challenges they face. This made Regina Rè the central character of the season. Down to the thirteenth season, women banking had its fly as it encouraged women to consider saving their money for financial security. The 2015-2016 season will cover the topics of tracking education for children, improving education in schools through teacher and parent participation, women's empowerment, and agribusiness entrepreneurship.

== Broadcast ==
Since its premiere, Makutano Junction has been broadcast all over East Africa. In Kenya it recorded regular viewership of 7 million viewers by 2013, making it the most watched local program in the country. In Tanzania, it recorded average viewership of 2 million viewers and a viewership rating of 3 million in Uganda.

== Maisha Makutano ==
In August 2025, Mediae Company announced a spin-off series titled Maisha Makutano, set to premiere on 6 September 2025 on Citizen TV. The upcoming 13-part series will continue the legacy of Makutano Junction as an edutainment soap opera, combining drama with social impact themes.

Produced by Rahma Seif (known for NBA: Jumping for Change) with Sophie Rottmann as co-producer, the show is directed by Vincent Mbaya (Pepeta, Country Queen) and Mkaiwawi Mwakaba (MTV Shuga Mashariki, Makosa ni Yangu).

Maisha Makutano will explore contemporary issues such as financial inclusion, agribusiness, gender-based violence, childcare, and reproductive health, maintaining the research-driven approach of its predecessor. The series aims to spark conversations and inspire positive behaviour change within Kenyan communities.

The spin-off will feature both new characters and familiar faces. Confirmed cast members include:

- Michelle Tiren (Nawi) as Esther Kabando – A salon owner rebuilding her life after her husband's scandal.
- Marianne Nungo (Supa Modo) as Dorothy Mwamburi – A bold chemist advocating for women’s rights.
- Carol Midimo (The Dog) as Margaret – Caught between family loyalty and community justice.
- Georgia Lenny (Taliya) as Achie Okoth – A single mother who opens a daycare.
- Wanjiru Marima (Reckless) as Gabby Mannasseh – A spirited dreamer chasing music and love.
- Naomi Kamau (Mother in Law) as Immaculate Ambani – A traditionalist nurse clashing with modern views on reproductive health.
- Tonny Njunguna (Subterranea) as Dr. Charles – A doctor balancing progressive ideals and love.
- Bruce Makau (2 Asunder) as William “KJ” Kabando Jnr – A former banker whose insecurities strain his marriage.
- Philip Luswata (returning from Makutano Junction) as Chairman Matano – A SACCO leader grappling with greed and integrity.
- Koome Kinoti (Crime & Justice) as Kevin Matawi – A tech-savvy son with ambitious dreams.

The series airedr every Saturday at 8:00 PM on Citizen TV, with episodes also available on YouTube via the Africa Knowledge Zone channel after broadcast.
