= Kenya Film Commission =

The Kenya Film Commission (KFC) was established by the Kenyan government in 2005. It came into full function in mid-2006. The Kenya Film Commission was formed with the aim of promoting the Kenyan film industry locally as well as internationally. International film-makers looking to film in Kenya are offered detailed information on locations by the commission, as well as liaison services on behalf of the government, advice on reconnaissance's, film licensing and immigration, and facilitation of the filming process.

== Structure ==
The Kenya Film Commission was under the Ministry of Information Broadcasting, Information, Communication and Technology since its inception in 2005, until 2014 when it was moved to the Sports, Culture, and the Arts. In 2019 it was taken back to the Ministry of ICT, Innovation and Youth Affairs. In 2022, it was again moved to the Ministry of Youth Affairs, Creative Economy and Sports. The Cabinet Secretary appoints the Board, while the Chairperson is appointed by the H. E. the President.

== Functions ==
The Kenya Film Commission supports the Kenyan film industry by providing facilities for screenings and filming, as well as organising various educational workshops on production for local film-makers. The commission is also establishing a database that will list filmmakers, agents, local talent, stakeholders and service providers of the Kenyan film industry. The Kenya Film Commission is a member of the Association of Film Commissions International.

== Recent productions ==
- Nowhere in Africa
- The Constant Gardener
- Tomb Raider II
- Good Morning America / ABC – live 2 hour broadcast “Seven Modern Wonders of the World”
- The Amazing Race
- Survivor Season 3
- Kibera Kid
- SlumDogg

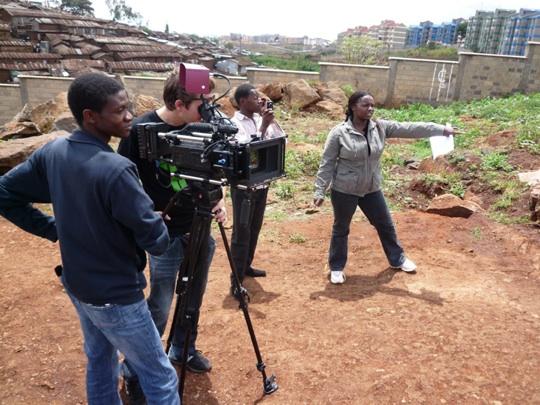
Shooting the Kenyan feature film Togetherness Supreme in collaboration with Kibera youth trainees
