= Kenya National Theatre =

Theatre in Nairobi, Kenya

Kenya National Theatre is part of the Kenya Cultural Centre, a Semi Autonomous Government Agency under the Ministry of State for National Heritage and Culture in Kenya. It is mandated to offer space for the rehearsal and staging of productions to both local and international repertoire. It is based in Nairobi along Harry Thuku Road and borders the University of Nairobi (UON), The Kenya Broadcasting Corporation (KBC) and The Fairmont Norfolk Hotel.

The history of the building has viewed its location as a hurdle for an earnest identification with the local artistic performances. The cost of maintenance has meant higher booking fees for fledgling repertoires, eventually reserving itself for a corporate clientele. The Kenya National Theatre has also been a subject of scholarly criticism and a basis for formulating a cultural policy.

In 2004, Kenya Cultural Centre Ltd contracted Millicon's Ltd to undertake a three phase renovation of the facility. In October 2007, Kenya National Theatre was handed over and renamed "National Theatre" with a notable interior design of the first floor's "Wasanii Restaurant" by Terry Tabor.

The Kenya National Theatre ( KNT), Kenya Conservatoire of Music, Mugumo Courtyard, The Kona ya Wasanii, Cheche Gallery and Ukumbi Mdogo are currently a component of the Kenya Cultural Center spaces and platforms.

== History ==
Plans for the Kenya National Theatre begun in 1949 when a committee requested the colonial government to build a theatre. The government passed a law (Chapter 218 of 1951), and provided land on what is now Harry Thuku Road for the building. The choice of location was due to safety considerations, as this was at the beginning of the Mau Mau uprising and that area was away from the areas frequented by Africans. Once complete, the 450-seat theatre had a dilapidated orchestra pit in the basement, an auditorium with a curtained stage, and a balcony. It also included a bar and restaurant on the first floor.

The theatre underwent a multimillion shilling renovation, which was completed between March 2014 and March 2015.

== Notable productions ==
The most notable performance is Conrad Makeni's production of I Will Marry When I Want by Ngũgĩ wa Thiong'o and Ngugi wa Mirii, play with a cast of 500. which landed Ngũgĩ wa Thiong'o in trouble with authorities in the 1980s.

In May 2003 the South African musical Sarafina!, was produced at the Kenya National Theatre by Sterling Quality Entertainment Company. The producers of the show, Peter J. Oyier and Paul J. Oyier also hosted Mbongeni Ngema and Leleti Khumalo for the premiere of the show, which had an all-Kenyan cast and was praised by Ngema and Khumalo for its accurate and powerful portrayal of the world-acclaimed musical theatre piece.

In 2017, the theatre hosted award-winning musical Jesus Christ Superstar, as well as Too Early for Birds, an experimental theatre production that stages stories from Kenyan history.The Kenya Conservatoire of Music and KNT are currently a component of the Kenya Cultural Center.
