= Sarah Hassan =

Kenyan actress and model

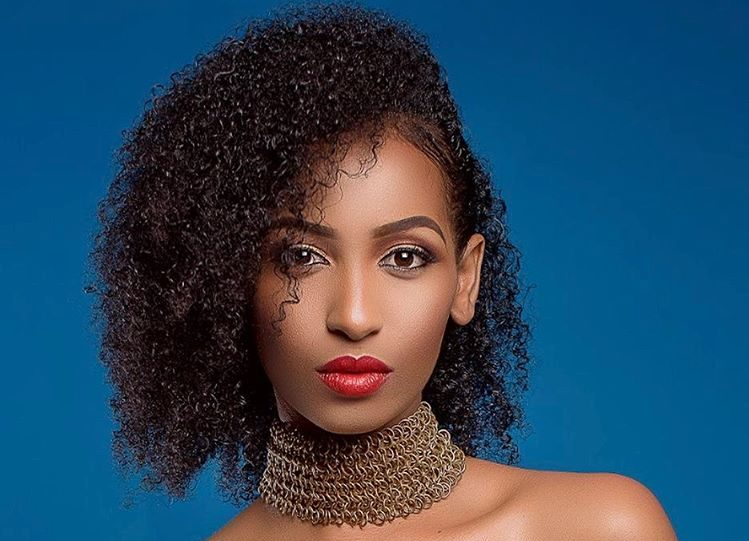
- Born: Sarah Hassan; 5 September 1988 (age 37); Mombasa, Kenya
- Citizenship: Kenyan
- Education: Bachelor of Science in Actuarial Science
- Alma mater: Jomo Kenyatta University of Agriculture and Technology, New York Film Academy
- Occupations: Actress; TV host; producer; director
- Years active: 2007–present
- Spouse: Martin Dale
- Children: 1
- Awards: Order of the Grand Warrior of Kenya (OGW) (2024)
- Website: Official website

Sarah Hassan, OGW (born 5 September 1988) is a Kenyan actress, producer, director and former TV host. She is notable for her roles in television series such as Crime and Justice, Tahidi High, The Wedding Show and Zora and films that include the Nigerian-Kenyan romantic comedy Plan B and Family Vacation. Hassan also features in DSTv's show, Zari, as Nina.

Her awards include Best Actress (2014) for the short film Now That You're Here; Best TV Host (2014) at the Kalasha Awards (Discovery+ 254); Best East African Journalist (2015) at the Swahili Fashion Week (Mashariki Mix and Maisha Max); Best Actress at the Kalasha Awards in 2019 (Plan B); and again in 2021 (Crime and Justice). In 2022, alongside Willy Paul, she was a Brand Ambassador for OPPO's Reno 8 phone series. She is currently the Brand Ambassador for Dettol Skincare.

== Early life ==
Sarah Hassan was born on September 5, 1988 in Mombasa, Kenya as the only child of her parents. She started acting at the age of five. For her secondary school education, she went to Machakos Girls' High School and later attended Jomo Kenyatta University of Agriculture and Technology, where she pursued a Bachelors of Science in Actuarial Science. She later on went to study Television and Film at the New York Film Academy in 2016.

== Career ==
Hassan made her debut on TV in 2009 as Tanya, on the Kenyan high school drama series Tahidi High and became one of the lead characters at the time. She also starred in several series such as Demigods, Saints, and Changes and even went on to host the East African dance show Sakata Mashariki. In 2013 she took over Noni Gathoni's role in The Wedding Show as the main host until December 2014.

Hassan was a lead producer for 40 Sticks which won several awards. Through her own production company, Alfajiri Productions, she has produced Plan B in 2019, Reflections—a short film and Just In Time. In 2018, while in Los Angeles after her studies, she also wrote, directed and produced a film, The Company You Keep.

In August 2024, Netflix released Family Vacation, a Kenyan drama co-directed by Voline Ogutu and Edwin Kamau, in which Hassan stars as an internet influencer who tries to save her marriage and family.

Besides acting, she is a brand ambassador to several Kenyan fashion lines. She is currently based in Nairobi, Kenya.

During the 61st Jamhuri Day celebrations in December 2024, Sarah Hassan got a Presidential Award for her contributions to the film industry. She was awarded an Order of the Grand Warrior (O.G.W) of Kenya recognition. This entitles her to add the initials of the honor after her name.

== Personal life ==
Sara Hassan married Martin Dale on February 25, 2017 and together they have a son.

== Filmography ==
Year	Title	Role	Notes
2007	Nefertiti and the Lost Dynasty		Debut
2009	Tahidi High	Tanya	Won—Chaguo la Teeniez Awards
2010	Demigods	Kamila	Supporting role
2011	Saints	Lora	Film cast
2011	Sakata	Herself	Host
2011	Changes	Liza	Film cast
2013	House of Lungula	Chichi	Film cast
2014–present	Jane & Abel	Leah	Main cast
2014	Live or Die	Catwoman	Film cast
2014	Now That You're Here	Katherine	Short film
2015–present	Discovery +254	Herself	Film cast 26 episodes
2015–present	How to Find a Husband	Carol	Lead role
2015–present	Maisha Max	Host	Reality show
2019	Plan B	Lisa	Main cast
2021	Just In Time	Muthoni	Main cast
2021	Zora	Zora	Lead role
2021-2022	Crime and Justice	Detective Makena	Lead role
2023	Zari	Nina	Main Cast
2024	Family Vacation	Yara Maleki	Lead role

== Nominations and awards ==
Year	Award	Category	Show	Result	Ref
2011	Chaguo la Teeniez Awards	Best Actress	Tahidi High	Won	
2013	Kalasha International Film and TV Awards	Best Supporting Actress	House of Lungula	Won	
2015	Kalasha International Film and TV Awards	Discovery +254	Best TV Hosts	Won	
2018	Festigious International Film Festival 2018	Best Actress	The Company You Keep	Nominated	
2018	L.A Shorts Awards 2018	Best Actress Silver Award	The Company You Keep	Nominated	
2018	L.A Shorts Awards 2018	Best Short Film Silver Award	The Company You Keep	Nominated	
2019	Kalasha International Film and TV Awards	Best Actress	Plan B	Won	
2021	Kalasha International Film and TV Awards	Best Actress in a TV Drama	Crime and Justice	Won	
2021	Kalasha International Film and TV Awards	Best Actress in a Film	Just In Time	Won	
2022	Africa Magic Viewers' Choice Awards	Best Actress in A Comedy	Just In Time	style="background: #FFE3E3; color: black; vertical-align: middle; text-align: center; " class="no table-no2 notheme"|Nominated	
2022	Africa Magic Viewers' Choice Awards	Best Movie East Africa	Just In Time	style="background: #FFE3E3; color: black; vertical-align: middle; text-align: center; " class="no table-no2 notheme"|Nominated	
2022	Africa Magic Viewers' Choice Awards	Best Movie Overall	Just In Time	style="background: #FFE3E3; color: black; vertical-align: middle; text-align: center; " class="no table-no2 notheme"|Nominated	
