= List of Kenyan rappers =

The following is a list of notable Kenyan rappers:

- Abbas Kubaff
- Bali Brahmbhatt
- Jua Cali
- Nafsi Huru
- Nonini
- Kaka Sungura
- Kayvo Kforce
- Monski
- Petra Bockle
- Shrekeezy
- Stella Mwangi
- Wangechi
