= Sanaipei Tande =

Kenyan singer and songwriter

- Also known as: Sana
- Born: Natasha Sanaipei Tande; 22 March 1985 (age 41); Mombasa, Kenya
- Origin: Nairobi, Kenya
- Genres: R&B; Afropop; Zouk; Neo-Taarab
- Occupations: Singer; Songwriter; Media Personality; Actress
- Instruments: Vocals, Piano
- Years active: 2004–present
- Website: www.sanaipeitande.com

Natasha Sanaipei Tande (born 22 March 1985), popularly known as Sana, is a Kenyan singer, songwriter, actress, radio personality and entertainer. She represented Kenya in the Intervision 2025 with the song "Flavour" finishing in 18th place with 179 points.

Born and raised in Mombasa, Tande attended Loreto Convent Mombasa, Mama Ngina High School and Aga Khan High School.

== Career ==
In 2004, at 19 years old, Tande joined the Coca-Cola Popstars (East Africa) Talent Search after being encouraged by her family. After successfully auditioning for the show, she deferred her pharmacy studies at Kenya Medical Training College. Tande won the competition alongside two other Kenyan contestants, Kevin Waweru and Pam Waithaka. Together, they formed the band Sema and won a record deal with Homeboyz Records. In 2005, the trio released a seventeen track debut album Mwewe, which included the singles "Leta Wimbo", "Sakalakata", and the eponymous "Mwewe", thrusting them into the limelight. Later in the same year, the band split, citing "irreconcilable differences" and "external forces".

After the band split, then Capital FM Kenya Chris Kirubi asked former Hits Not Homework presenter Eve D'Souza to train Tande as a radio presenter, but eventually determined that she was not a good fit for the station. Shortly after, she joined Kiss 100, where she shadowed presenter Angela Angwenyi and later began to present the Mid Morning Show and Keeping It Kenyan on Saturdays.

In 2012, Tande left Kiss 100. She joined Easy FM (now Nation FM) in 2013 as co-presenter of the drive show alongside Edward Kwach. In 2014, she released the single "Mfalme wa Mapenzi" as part of producer Wawesh's Mahaba project, a showcase of Swahili love songs. The song earned Tande widespread critical acclaim for her songwriting. She later became co-host the mid-morning show alongside comedian Obinna Ike Igwe and subsequently its sole host. In September 2015, Tande and fellow presenters Ciru Muriuki and Anto Neo Soul were laid off. Their termination was met with uproar on social media platforms, with many listeners and fans demanding their reinstatement.

After leaving Easy FM, Tande focused on music, releasing singles such as "Rasta Man", "Simama Imara", and "Ankula Huu". Her hit single, "Amina", broadened her regional appeal and caught the attention of Tanzanian musician Chege Chigunda, who invited her to Dar es Salaam to write and feature on his single "Najiuliza" alongside Ray C.

=== 2016–present ===
After a cameo on NTV's Auntie Boss! and a recurring role on Maisha Magic's Varshita, both produced by Eve D'Souza's Moon Beam Productions, Tande starred as the eponymous character in Rashid Abdalla's Aziza, a Swahili soap opera set in Mombasa. She continued her music career by featuring on Mombasa singer Otile Brown's "Chaguo La Moyo". In 2020, they released their second collaboration, the single "Aiyana".

On 5 March 2020, Tande hosted her final karaoke at The Grove on Riverside and retired from karaoke. She went on to release "Mdaka Mdakiwa", "Kunitema", and "Yako". She also featured in Nadia Mukami's single "Wangu" off her African Popstar EP. The music video garnered four million views in its first week on YouTube and was dubbed the biggest Kenyan collaboration of the year. In October 2021, Tande released her six-track debut EP, Nabo, featuring Nyashinski and Khaligraph Jones. Since 2020, Tande has starred as Nana Tandala on Kina, a Kenyan adaptation of the South African television series The River, which airs on Maisha Magic Plus. In 2025, she starred in the Showmax Original The Chocolate Empire as Margaret Nuru and in the Netflix Original Kash Money. In November 2025, she joined, Lulu, as Sonia alongside Brenda Wairimu, Bruce Makau and Raymond Ofula, on Maisha Magic Plus.

== Discography ==
=== Studio albums ===
- Nabo EP (2022)
- 40 & Four Tune EP (2025)

=== Compilation albums ===
- Sanaa (2020)

=== Singles ===
==== As lead artist ====
Year	Song	Featured artists	Album	Ref(s)
2021	"Jali"	Nyashinski	Nabo (EP)	
2020	"Yako"		Sanaa	
2020	"Mdaka Mdakiwa"		Sanaa	
2020	"Kunitema"		Sanaa	
2017	"Amina"		Sanaa	
2017	"Simama Imara"		Sanaa	
2015	"Rasta Man"		Sanaa	
2015	"Ankula Huu"		Sanaa	
2014	"Mfalme Wa Mapenzi"		Sanaa	
2013	"Geti Kali"	Jua Kali	Sanaa	
2013	"I Wish"		Sanaa	
2012	"Mpango Wa"			
2012	"Your Property"		Sanaa	
2010	"Najuta"		Sanaa	
2007	"Niokoe"		Sanaa	
2006	"Niwe Wako"			

==== As a featured artist ====
Year	Song	Artists	Album	Ref(s)
2021	"Sina Haja"	Femi One	Greatness	
2021	"Baridi"	Nviiri the Storyteller	Kitenge [EP]	
2021	"Dada"	Band Beca,	Single	
2021	"Hold You"	Dufla Diligon	Single	
2021	"Nakuja"	B Classic	Single	
2020	"Wangu"	Nadia Mukami	African Popstar EP	
2020	"Rise Again"	Samaki Mkuu, Romantico, Nazizi and Dinah Ndombi	Single	
2015	"Miaka Kadhaa"	King Kaka		
2015	"Change"	King Kaka, Jimwat, Juacali, Avril, Marya, Ala C, Alpha Msanii		
2013	"I am Here"	K-Denk	Single	
2012	"Happy"	Big Pin		
2011	"Mulika Mwizi"	Kidum		
2011	"Not The One"	Dan Aceda		
2010	"Big Shot Remix"	Madtraxx, Collo, Prezzo, Nameless, Frasha, Porgie, DJ Stylez, Bamzigi		
2008	"You"	Big Pin	Single	
2007	"Kwaheri"	Juacali	Single	

== Filmography ==
=== Television ===
Year	Title	Role	Awards
2020–2023	Kina	Nana Tandala	Kalasha Award, Best Lead Actress in a TV Drama, 2022
2018 - 2019	Aziza	Aziza	
2017 - 2018	Varshita!	Eva	
2016	Auntie Boss!		
2025	The Chocolate Empire (Kenyan TV Series)	Margaret Nuru	
2025	Lulu	Sonia Oremo	
