= Muthoni Gathecha =

Kenyan actress (born 1962)

Mūthoni Gathecha
- Born: April 8, 1962 (age 63); Nairobi, Kenya
- Education: United States International University
- Occupations: Actress; Lecturer
- Years active: 2012-present
- Children: 3

Mūthoni Gathecha (born April 8, 1962) is a Kenyan actress. She has starred in several Kenyan television series.

== Early life ==
Born April 8, 1962, Mūthoni is a teacher and an education administrator at Kenyatta University. She trained as a psychologist in the United States International University.

== Career ==
In 2013, she was one of the protagonists in Kenya's telenovela, Kona. She played together with an ensemble cast of Nini Wacera, Janet Sision, and Lwanda Jawar. She later returned to TV in 2014 when she starred in Pray and Prey as the villainous Margaret, an evil and overprotective mother. Her latest role was in the soap opera, Skandals kibao, in which she played the loving mother of two daughters. She shared credits with actresses like Avril and Janet Sision. Mūthoni has appeared in films that are mainly produced under the Africa Magic Movie Franchise. They include Shortlist, Close Knit Group, Get Me a Job, The Black Wedding, The Next Dean, and I Do.

== Personal life ==
Mūthoni is a mother of three. Her first born is a rap artist and musician who goes by the stage name Mchizi Gaza. Her second child is Rowzah, a fashion designer. Her youngest is Mizen.

== Filmography ==
Year	Project	Role	Title
2013	Kona	Ariya Oyange	Main role
2014-15	Pray and Prey	Margaret	Main Antagonist
2015–present	Skandals kibao	Mama	Main role
2015–present	"Mama digital"	mama digital	titular Lead role
2018	This Is Life		
2019	The System	Sharon	
2020	Sincerely Daisy	Hilda	
2022	Regina rurală	Salome	
2022	Shimoni	Martha	
2024	Boda Love	Grandma Lucy	
