= Tokodi =

Tokodi is a surname. Notable people with the surname include:

- Kiyika Tokodi, Congolese footballer
- Pascal Tokodi (born 1993), Kenyan musician, actor, comedian, and songwriter
