= Varshita! =

Kenyan comedy television series

Varshita is a spinoff of the hit show Auntie Boss. The comedy show premiered in 2017 on DStv. It charts the toxic relationship of onscreen couple Donovan and Varshita and how their families struggle to coexist peacefully.

Varshita stars Eve D'souza and Maqbul Mohammed as a young couple from completely different cultures and backgrounds. The show also stars Sanaipei Tande, Dennis Musyoka, Mukami Njiru and Douglas Muigai.

== Awards ==
Varshita won Best TV Comedy at the Kalasha Awards in 2020 beating 2019 winner Nyanya Rukia and 2017 winner Hullabaloo Estate. The show also scooped Best Performance in a TV Comedy for Mukami Njiru.

Varshita is produced by Lucy Mwangi, the woman behind other local comedies such as Njoro wa Uba and Auntie Boss.
