= Lulu (TV series) =

2025 Kenyan crime drama

- Genre: Crime Drama Telenovela
- Written by: Rashid Abdallah
- Directed by: Various
- Starring: Angie Magio; Ronald Ndubi; Mufasa the Poet; Alex Kinuthia; Nungari Kiore; Ciku Muchiri; Sanaipei Tande; Brenda Wairimu; Robert Agengo; Raymond Ofula
- Country of origin: Kenya
- Original languages: English; Swahili
- No. of seasons: 1

Production
- Producers: Rashid Abdallah; Lulu Hassan
- Running time: 40 - 50 minutes
- Production company: Jiffy Pictures

Original release
- Network: Maisha Magic Plus
- Release: 5 May 2025 – present

Lulu is a Kenyan drama television series produced by Jiffy Pictures for Maisha Magic Plus.

The series is a crime drama that centers on the Tindo family empire, exploring themes of betrayal, drug trafficking, and vengeance. It features an ensemble cast including Angie Magio, Nick Odhiambo, Sanaipei Tande, and Brenda Wairimu.

The show premiered on Maisha Magic Plus on May 5 at 8:30 pm, succeeding Zari in its time slot.

== Plot ==
Amara Tindo (Angie Magio) us the powerful matriarch of the influential Tindo family. Her life unravels when she discovers that her husband, Hudson Tindo (Nick Odhiambo), plans to annul their turbulent marriage in favour of their maid. The revelation unleashes a chain of events that forces Amara to take drastic action.

Unbeknown to her, the family's vast fortune is tied to a covert drug-trafficking enterprise. When Hudson is no longer able to lead the empire, Amara steps in only to face internal betrayals, dangerous alliances, and the heavy burden of protecting her family's legacy. As enemies close in and power shifts, Amara must decide how far she is willing to go for survival.

== Cast ==
- Angie Magio as Amara Tindo, the fierce and calculating Tindo family matriarch.
- Ronald Ndubi as Tozi Tindo, Amara's hot headed step son. He deems himself the heir apparent to his father's empire.
- Alex Kinuthia as Lema Tindo, Amara's charismatic son.
- Mufasa the Poet as Uncle T, Hudson's younger brother. He is deeply insecure and the weakest link in the family.
- Ciku Muchiri as Fifi Tindo, Amara's daughter. A darling of the house and a spoilt brat. She is smart and assertive, not evil, but not a pushover.
- Lydia Gitachu as Kismat Tindo, Hudson Tindo's first wife. She is bitter, downtrodden, humble, yet anger consumes her. A motherly figure that is deeply traditional and conservative.
- Nick Odhiambo as Hudson Tindo, Amara's husband, whose unexpected death in the first episode triggers the show's events.
- Nungari Kiore as Anita, the maid entangled in a secret love affair with Hudson.
- George Mo as Officer Killy, a senior DCI officer investigating the Tindo family.
- Lorna Lemi as Nia, Officer Killy's daughter.
- Raymond Ofula as Cleophas Oremo: The fallen patriarch of the Oremo family (Flashbacks/Recurring).
- Brenda Wairimu as Bri Oremo, Cleophas's cunning daughter determined to continue his legacy.
- Sanaipei Tande as Sonia Oremo, Cleophas's young widow who brings seduction and strategy into the power struggle.
- Bruce Makau as Diamond Oremo. He is Cleophas’ younger brother, joining the fight for vengeance and control.

== Series overview ==
Season	Episodes	Originally released	
Season	Episodes	First released	Last released
1	TBC	May 5, 2025	Ongoing

=== Season 1 (2025) ===
No.	Title	Directed by	Original release date
1	"Pilot"	Various	5 May 2025
In a high-stakes narrative full of twists and betrayals, Hudson's dark and hidden source of wealth is exposed, leading to shocking revelations about his life and dealings. Just as the mystery deepens, Fifi's wedding—meant to be a joyous occasion— quickly turns to tragedy when Hudson is found dead under mysterious circumstances. In a jaw-dropping twist, it is revealed that the person responsible for his death is none other than Hudson's wife, Amara.
2	"Secrets unravel"	Various	6 May 2025
Afande Killy is determined to uncover Hudson's killer, believing they’re inside the Tindo's house. Tozi seeks revenge for his father’s death, while tensions rise between Afandi Killy and Nia over Joe's return. Siwa struggles to keep Amara calm.
3	"Drama at the funeral"	Various	7 May 2025
Kismat’s dramatic arrival turns Hudson's funeral into a showdown between her and Amara who now regrets ordering the hit.
4	"Mtoi wa karao alinisave"	Various	8 May 2025
Amid the chaos, Lema finds unexpected love, Tozi seeks vengeance over his father's death, while Siwa and Amara put a plan in place to fix Kizito.
5	"Umekuwa mwizi?"	Various	9 May 2025
Chuchi uncovers crucial CCTV footage that may implicate Amara, Tete urges Tozi to take over his father's empire, while Amara and Siwa fix Anita.

== Production ==
=== Development ===
Lulu is produced by Jiffy Pictures, a Kenyan production company founded by Rashid Abdalla and Lulu Hassan. The show was developed as a direct replacement for the network's previous hit telenovela, Zari.

Executive Producer Rashid Abdalla described the series as a narrative designed to explore "the lengths people go to for power, love, and survival," focusing on the complexities of ambition within family dynamics.

MultiChoice unveiled Lulu at am exclusive party attended by the cast and crew.

== Release ==
Lulu premiered on Maisha Magic Plus on 5 May 2025 at 8:30 pm. New episodes air every Monday to Friday at the same time slot.
