= Azziad Nasenya =

Kenyan actress (born 2000)

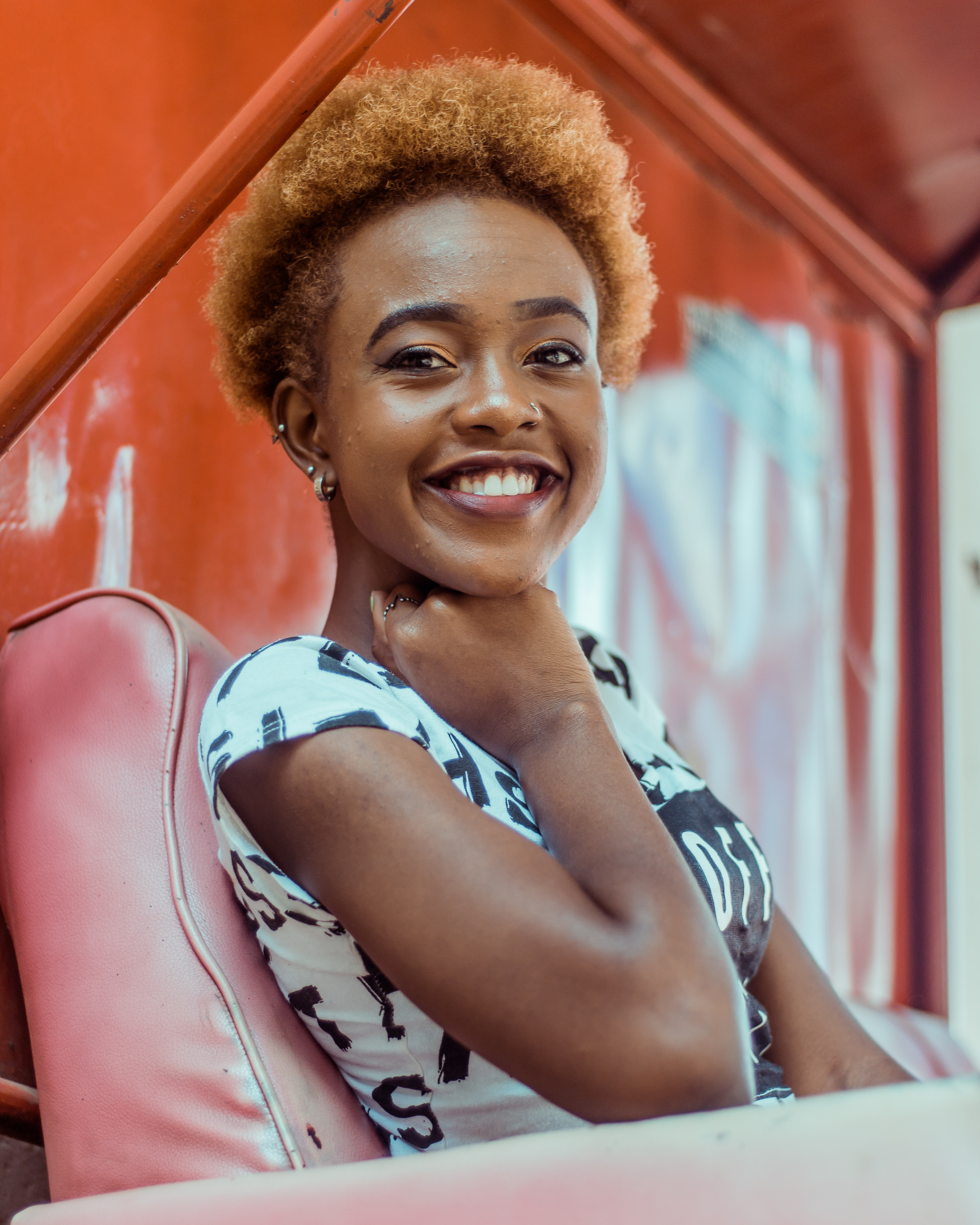
- Nasenya in 2020
- Born: Azziad Nasenya Wafula; 16 June 2000 (age 26); Mumias, Kenya
- Occupations: Actress; Content Creator; Social Media Personality
- Years active: 2020–present

Instagram information
- Page: azz_iad
- Years active: 2018-present
- Followers: 2.5 million

TikTok information
- Page: Azz_iad
- Followers: 3.4 million

YouTube information
- Channel: Azziad Nasenya
- Years active: 2018-present
- Subscribers: 177 thousand
- Last updated: 23 April 2026

Azziad Nasenya Wafula (born 16 June 2000) is a Kenyan actress, content creator, media host and social media personality. She is popularly known as Kenya's TikTok Queen. Active since 2019, she has successfully modeled for brands such as Linkosiclothing L&C and Home 254, among others.

== Early life ==
Born in Mumias, Kenya, Azziad Nasenya grew up in Kakamega County and Nairobi. She studied at Central Primary School in Mumias, Cathsam School in Nairobi, and eventually completed her primary education at Lugulu Girls Boarding Primary School. She thereafter went to St. Cecilia Misikhu Girls' High School, Misikhu, and completed her secondary education in 2017. Azziad started acting and dancing in school skits in Class 2 (at the age of seven) and continued doing so while in high school. Azziad holds a Diploma in Broadcast Journalism, from Kenya Institute of Mass Communication.

== Career ==
=== Theatre ===
Azziad performed solo verses while in high school, competing at the National Level of The Kenya Schools and Colleges Drama Festival. In December 2017, after completing her secondary education, she joined the Hearts of Art Theatre Group in Nairobi, Kenya. Her first role in the Group was as a part of the supporting cast in the play Repair my Heart in March 2018. Between 2018 and 2019, Azziad was cast in seven stage plays by Hearts of Art. While performing for the group, Azziad met her current manager, Peter Kawa, who is an actor, director, producer and filmmaker.

=== TikTok ===
Azziad joined TikTok in August 2019, showcasing her dancing, lip sync and acting skills. Her TikTok account topped several challenges and was verified in February 2020, earning her the title of East Africa TikTok Queen. In April 2020, a video of Azziad dancing to Femi One and Mejja's Utawezana song went viral. The video made her famous and she gained huge following on TikTok as netizens liked her dancing and inexplicable aura, thereby enabling her to build her brand to become a TikTok sensation.

=== Television ===
In early 2020, Azziad was cast as a lead female role in a television series, but production was postponed due to the coronavirus pandemic.

In June 2020, she debuted as Chichi in Selina Telenovela on Maisha Magic East by M-Net and MultiChoice.

In July 2020, Azziad co-hosted Concert Nyumbani with Mwaniki Mageria, a TV show celebrating COVID-19 heroes.

In 2024, Azziad was cast in Prefects, a TV show running in Kenya and Uganda since September. She plays as Miss Kemi, a Mathematics teacher in the show.

=== Radio ===
Azziad Nasenya hosts a Breakfast Show at Sound City Kenya radio station, called WhatsUp254. She landed the job in April 2021. The show runs on weekdays, from 6am to 10am.

== Additional information ==
Azziad hosts The Shoe Game with Azziad on her YouTube channel, where she explores the stories behind her guests' shoes.

In September 2020, Azziad was appointed as an Official Global Ambassador for the Save Our Future campaign. Later on, in February 2022, she was named as the BIC ambassador for Miss Soleil, a women's razor.

Azziad got a government appointment as a member of the Creatives Technical Committee, under the Ministry of Youth Affairs, Sports and Arts. The appointment, made in February 2023, under a Government Gazette Notice, was later revoked by then minister, Ababu Namwamba. The appointment of the Creatives Technical Committee had been challenged in court by Charles Mugane, an advocate of the High Court, leading to its suspension by High Court Judge Lawrence Mugambi.

== Awards and nominations ==
In 2021, Azziad was nominated for an international E! People's Choice Awards, in the African social star category.

== Filmography ==
Year	Title	Role	Notes	Ref
2019	Parenting	Daughter	Short Film	
2020	Selina Telenovela	Chichi/Banca/Fatuma	TV series	
2020	Concert Nyumbani	Herself	Host – TV Show	
2023	Faithless	Carmen	TV series	
2024	Prefects	Miss Kemi	TV series	
