= World Tofauti =

2017 film directed by Kang'ethe Mungai

- Directed by: Kang'ethe Mungai
- Written by: Kang'ethe Mungai
- Produced by: Kang'ethe Mungai
- Starring: Avril Nyambura (Avril); Innocent Njuguna; Maureen Njau
- Cinematography: Benson Kamau
- Edited by: Henry Gachuna; Paul Louis
- Production company: Kikwetu Productions
- Release date: 22 December 2017
- Running time: 71 minutes
- Country: Kenya
- Languages: Swahili; English

World Tofauti (A Different World in English) is a 2017 Kenyan romantic film directed by Kang'ethe Mungai. The film stars Avril Singer and Innocent Njuguna. Maureen Njau features in a supporting role. A man robbed of his valuables at JKIA soon begins to fall in love with a ghetto girl who participated in robbing him despite being engaged to another girl.

== Synopsis ==
Nina (played by Avril Nyambura) is a woman born and raised in the slums of Nairobi. She meets Hinga (played by Innocent Mungai), a man from a decent background and a good job, who is stranded with a flat tire near the Jomo Kenyatta International Airport, and together with her gang, they rob him of all his valuables. In a twist of fate, the two eventually fall in love despite the fact that Hinga is engaged to Ciru (Maureen Njau), a demanding and controlling woman of his same societal background. Hinga eventually helps Nina to track down his valuables as well as evade the authorities.

== Cast ==
- Avril Singer as Nina, a woman raised in a Nairobi slum, brought up in a life of crime
- Innocent Njuguna as Hinga, a successful Nairobi businessman
- Maureen Njau as Ciru, Hinga's demanding and controlling fiancée

== Release ==
World Tofauti premiered at the Kenya National Theatre in Nairobi, Kenya on 22 December 2017.

== Accolades ==
Awarding Organisation	Category	Year	Nominee	Result	Ref.
Kalasha Awards	Best Local Language Film	2018	World Tofauti	Won	
Kalasha Awards	Best Supporting Actress	2018	Peris Wambui	Nominated	
Kalasha Awards	Best Lead Actress Film	2018	Avril Nyambura	Nominated	
Kalasha Awards	Best Picture	2018	World Tofauti	Nominated	
