= Otile Brown =

Kenyan singer and songwriter

- Born: Jacob Obunga; 11 March 1994 (age 32); Kisumu, Kenya
- Occupations: Singer; songwriter
- Musical career
- Genres: Afrobeats; R&B; pop; hip hop; soul
- Instrument: Vocals
- Label: Independent

Jacob Obunga popularly known as Otile Brown (born 11 March 1994) is a Kenyan independent R&B singer, songwriter, guitarist, and actor. He gained media attention after the release of his hit single "Imaginary Love," featuring Khaligraph Jones. He released his debut studio album, in April 2017 which included the singles "Basi", "Alivyonipenda", "Shujaa Wako", "DeJavu" and "Aiyolela". Otile has collaborated with artists such as Sanaipei Tande, Okangasto, Barakah The Prince, King Kaka, Volvexzshawa, Ruby, Phina among others.

== Early life ==
Otile Brown was born on March 21, 1994, in Kisumu and raised in Miritini, Mombasa. He is the youngest in a family of four - three brothers and one sister. Otile started singing and writing songs at age 13.

== Music career ==
=== 2017:Best of Otile Brown ===
Otile's debut album, Best of Otile Brown was released in April 2017. The lead single "Imaginary Love" featuring Kenyan rapper, Khaligraph Jones was released on June 3, 2016. The song was played on several radio stations in Kenya. He parted ways with Dreamland Music label in March 2017 and became an Independent artist.

Since his breakthrough into the Kenyan music industry, Otile has garnered several awards including "Male Video of the Year" at Pulse Music Awards 2018 for his single "Baby Love".

== Personal life ==
Otilen Brown is known for his relationship with Vera Sidika, a Kenyan Socialite. Their relationship ended in August 2018.

== Discography ==
=== Album ===
- Best of Otile Brown (2017)

=== Singles ===
Title	Year of release
Imaginary Love ft. Khaligraph Jones	2016
DeJavu	2016
Basi	2016
Alivyonipenda ft King Kaka	2016
Niseme Nawe	2016
Shujaa Wako	2016
Everything	2016
Hello	2016
Kistaarabu	2017
Yule Mbaya	2017
Acha Waseme	2017
Mapenzi Hisia	2017
Aiyolela	2017
Chaguo la Moyo ft. Sanaipei Tande	2018
Baby Love	2018
Tamu Sana ft. Shetta	2018
Hi	2018
Samantha	2018
Vera	2018
Nikupe Nini	2018
Mungu wetu sote	2018
Aje Anione	2018
Kenyan Girl	2019
Crush	2019
Nitulie	2019
Siku Yetu	2019
Nabayet	2019
This Kind of Love	2019
The Way You Are	2020
Aiyana ft. Sanaipei Tande	2020
Wine	2020
In Love ft. Ali Kiba	2021

Just in Love Album

Otile Brown's Just in Love Album officially released on June 3, 2020, proved that Otile is not only the best musician in Kenya, but also the most outstanding R&B artist in East and Central Africa. Otile shared the news with his fans on social media saying the album will be launched on Boomplay. The album has 11 songs with some of them being collaborations with different artistes from Kenya and Tanzania. The album is listed below

Title	Year released
Regina ft Jux	June 3, 2020
Dede	June 3, 2020
Hit & Run ft Khaligraph Jones	June 3, 2020
Vibe	June 3, 2020
Leila ft Kidum	June 3, 2020
Kosea	June 3, 2020
Umedamshi	June 3, 2020
Dusuma ft Meddy	June 3, 2020
Watoto na Pombe ft Mejja	June 3, 2020
Zaidi Yako	June 3, 2020
Pretty Girls	June 3, 2020

== Awards ==
- Nominee, Pulse Music Awards, Baby Love "Male Video of the Year" (2018)
- Nominee, HiPipo Music Awards, East Africa Song of The Year -Kenya (2019)
