= Pascal Tokodi =

Kenyan musician, actor and comedian

- Born: Pascalino Lpesinoi Lenguro Tokodi; 21 April 1993 (age 33); Ongata Rongai, Kajiado, Kenya
- Citizenship: Kenya
- Occupations: Actor; Musician; Songwriter; Comedian
- Years active: 2012 – present
- Known for: Selina: Telenovela
- Spouse: Grace Ekirapa (m. 2020)
- Children: 1

Pascal Tokodi (born 21 April 1993) is a Kenyan actor, comedian, director and musician-songwriter in the RnB style. He is known for his role in the romantic comedy Disconnect (2018) for which he won the Best Supporting Actor in a Movie or TV Series award at the 2020 Africa Magic Viewers' Choice Awards, and as Nelson in the Kenyan swahili telenovela, Selina. Winning best actor at the kalasha awards 2 years in a row Tokodi's music career began when he placed third in the Kenyan, Tecno Own the Stage television talent competition. In 2016, Tokodi released his first new singleSitaki.

== Early life ==
His full name is Pascalino Lpesinoi Leguro Tokodi, was born on 21 April 1993 and brought up in Rongai, Kajiado county. His father is a Kenya Wildlife Service officer and the mother is a medical practitioner. Pascal is a second born of nine, six boys and three girls.

=== Education ===
He did his primary education at St. Mary's Primary School in Rongai the he progressed to Lenana School in Nairobi for his Kenya Certificate of Secondary Education.

== Career ==
In 2012, Tokodi took a role in Makutano Junction, a Kenyan soap opera on Citizen TV. This was followed in 2013 by a role in Groove Theory, Kenya's first television musical drama. Tokodi played Guy, a member of the prestigious Victoria University Campus Choir. In 2014, Tokodi featured in Pray & Prey, a Kenyan comedy drama and in 2015, in Wrath on Fox Africa. Tokodi played Nelson in the Swahili language telenovela, Selina in 2018.

In 2016, Tokodi was a contestant in the Tecno Own the Stage karaoke themed television competition. This led to the release of his single, Sitaki. In 2017, Kaka Empire record label signed Tokodi leading to singles and music collaborations.

=== Singles ===
- Sitaki (2016)
- Hii si Kwaheri (2017) with Friends of CEEL
- Forget (2017) with rapper, King Kaka
- Milele (2017) with King Kaka
- African Lady (2017)
- Asante Mama (2017) with rapper, Phill.
- Songa (2017) with Omari Carson Nyamosi
- Naito (2020)

== Personal life ==
Tokodi was born Pascal Tokodi 1993 in Ongata Rongai. In 2020, he married Grace Ekirapa, a Kenyan TV host and gospel singer; the couple welcomed a daughter, Jasmine Ariah Lenguro Tokodi in 2022 but have since separated.

== Filmography ==
Year	Title	Role	Notes
2012 - 2015	Makutano Junction		Cast, TV series (4 episodes)
2013 - 2014	Grove Theory	Pascal L'pesinoi	Cast, TV series
2014	Run Kenya		Cast
2014	Get Me a Job		Cast
2014 - 2015	Pray & Prey	Isaac	Cast, TV series (78 episodes)
2017	Marikiti Women	Jonah	Cast
2018	Disconnect	Otis	Cast
2020	Midlife Crisis	Collete's Boyfriend	Cast
2016 - 2020	Selina: Telenovela	Nelson Mackenzie	Cast, TV series
2022	Ayaanle	Agent Kimani	Cast
2022	A Familiar Christmas	Melita	Cast
2022	Disconnect: The wedding Planner	Otis	Cast
2024	Untying Kantai	Arnold	Cast
2024	Makosa ni Yangu	Saint	Cast

== Awards and nominations ==
Tokodi placed third in the Tecno Own the Stage competition, winning one million Kenyan shillings. He was the best actor, three years in a row in Kenya. Tokodi won the best supporting actor award at the 2020 Africa Magic Viewers' Choice Awards.

Year	Awarding Organization	Category	Nominee	Result	Ref
2020	Africa Magic Viewers' Choice Awards	Best Supporting Actor in a Movie or TV Series	Pascal Tokodi	Won	
2018	Kalasha International Film and TV Awards	Best Supporting Actor in a Film	Pascal Tokodi	Won	
2018	Kalasha International Film and TV Awards	Best Lead Actor in a TV Drama	Pascal Tokodi	Nominated	
2019	Kalasha International Film and TV Awards	Best Lead Actor in a TV Drama	Pascal Tokodi	Won	
