= Skandals Kibao =

- Genre: Soap opera
- Directed by: Mary Migui
- Starring: Lwanda Jawar; George Mo; Bilhard Wanjau; Vincent Mbaya; Janet Sision; Avril
- Country of origin: Kenya
- Original languages: English; Swahili; Sheng
- No. of episodes: 19

Production
- Producer: Lwanda Jawar
- Production location: Nairobi
- Editor: Ambrose Muindi
- Camera setup: Single camera
- Running time: 40 minutes

Original release
- Network: KTN
- Release: 16 August 2015 – 1 May 2016

Related
- Jalango with the Money

Skandals Kibao (English: Full of Scandals) is a Kenyan soap opera that debuted on KTN in August 2015. It is directed by Mary Migui. The main cast includes; Lwanda Jawar, George Mo, Vincent Mbaya, Billiard Wanjau, Janet Sision and Avril.

== Synopsis ==
Four friends John, Maxwell, Kingsley and George decide to have a bachelor's party a night before John's wedding to his girlfriend Christine (Janet Sision). They engage in taking heavy illicit drugs; they get high on them. The following day, when they are sober, they realize that John has not awaken; he has succumbed to the drugs. Christine is waiting for her groom but then she decides to call off the wedding. Later that day, the three friends see a homeless man named Joe on television. He is suffering from amnesia and is in appearance identical to John. They convince Joe to impersonate John, they believing that at least he will have shelter. A series of lies, deceit, envy and greed follows.

== Cast ==
=== Main ===
- Lwanda Jawar as John/Joe, portrayed two identical men whose relationship is still unclear. John is Christine's fiance, friend to Maxwell, Kingsley and George. He perishes as a consequence of drug overdose. Joe, on the other hand, has forgotten his past making him vulnerable to get brainwashed by John's friends.
- Janet Sision as Christine, she is insecure and tries to be a good daughter and a perfect fiancé. She has to bare with her sister's attitude towards her. She becomes the victim of John's comrades and has to live a lie with Joe not knowing he is an impostor. Behind that lies a secret that she and her mother maintain, she is barren from an abortion in her earlier years.
- George Mo as Maxwell, he is more of an enemy than friend to John. He despises him for having Christine. Thereby he will do anything to have her. Moreover, he is a drug dealer and he will do whatever necessary to get a fat pocket.
- Vincent Mbaya as George, he is John's most attached best friend of the three.
- Avril as Karen is Christine's elder sister. Due to her bad choices in life she engages herself into drugs which almost lead her to death. As a result of her relationship with Alex, she gets pregnant and decides to get rid of it.
- Bilharl Wanjau as Kingsley, he is weak and feeble. He bares the bullying and insults from his friends especially Maxwell and still clings to his abusive wife. He cannot make his own decisions, this makes him Maxwell's puppet.
- Muthoni Gathecha as Mama, she is Christine and Karen's loving mother. Her daughters are the apple of her eyes.
- Brenda Wairimu as Kiki, John's friend and a possible rival to Christine as she awakens her jealousy when she apparently spends much time with her fiance. She runs a group of muggers in the suburbs of Nairobi.

=== Supporting ===
- Bobby Muga as Alex, he gets into an affair with Karen resulting into a pregnancy and he is against the abortion.
- Robert Agengo as Nathan, a journalist and Alex's friend. He investigates the four friends.
- Mumbi Lukwili as Stepmom, she is Joe's stepmother, conniving and out to take away what is due Joe following the death of his father. She fails to realize that her efforts are creating a monster out of her stepson David.
- Justin Mirichii as David, he is Joe's half-brother, psychotic and manipulated by his mother which results in her death and he burying her.
- Florence Nduta as Joan, John's supposed mother that opposes the marriage between John and Christine.

== Production ==
It is produced by Lwanda Jawar and directed by Mary Migui. Filming was done entirely in Nairobi.

== Release ==
Skandals Kibao premiered on KTN from August 16, 2015. It aired on Sundays at 8 pm but later moved to Tuesday 8 pm to pave the time slot to Ultimate Weight Challenge.

Timeslot (EAT)	# Ep.	Premiere		Finale		Rank	TV season	Views average
Timeslot (EAT)	# Ep.	Date	Premiere share	Date	Finale share	Rank	TV season	Views average
Sundays; 8 pm(episodes:1-11); Tuesday; 8 pm (episodes:12–)	—N/a	August 16, 2015	—N/a	—	TBA	TBA	2015-16	TBD
