= Wacera =

Wacera is a surname of Kenyan origin. Notable people with the surname include:

- Mary Wacera Ngugi (born 1988), Kenyan long-distance runner
- Nini Wacera (born 1978), Kenyan actress and director
