= Abbas Kubaff =

Kenyan rapper

- Born: Andrew Kabiru Karuku; 8 January 1978 (age 48); Kariobangi, Kenya
- Genres: Kenyan hip hop; hip hop
- Occupations: Rapper; singer; songwriter
- Years active: 1995–present
- Website: www.abbaskubaff.com

Andrew Kabiru Karuku (born 8 January 1978), popularly known as Abbas Kubaff, is a Kenyan hip hop artist who was raised in the Kariobangi South, Nairobi. As a member of the rap group K-South, and later as a solo artist, Abbas has shaped and pioneered rap music in East Africa from the in 1995. K-South was a trio formed by Abbas, his brother KC and neighborhood friend Bamboo. The group split in 2005 after KC went missing and Bamboo move to the United States. As a solo artist Abbas is famous for hit songs such as "Chapaa" and "Tokelezea". He won a Chaguo La Teeniez Awards award in 2008 and a Golden Mic award in 2011. In 2006, Kubaff released his debut album Angabanga. He has toured extensively in Europe and has performed in Nairobi as the opening act for Coolio, Lost Boyz, Maxi Priest and Akon. In 2014 he released his fourth studio album known as Ghettoholic.

== Discography ==
- Nairobbery (As K-South) (2001)
- Nairobizm (As K-South) (2003)
- Angabanga (2006)
- Welcome To The Madhouse (As part of collaborative project BLNRB) (2009)
- Mister Abbas (2010)
- Ghettoholic (2014)

== Personal life ==
Abbas is twice divorced.

== See also ==
- List of Kenyan rappers
