= Subira (2018 film) =

2018 Kenyan drama film

- Film poster
- Directed by: Ravneet Sippy Chadha
- Written by: Ravneet Sippy Chadha; Lorenzo Favella; Vibeke Muasya
- Produced by: Ravneet Sippy Chadha; Vibeke Muasya
- Starring: Brenda Wairimu; Tirath Padam; Nice Githinji; Ali Mwangola
- Cinematography: Talib Rasmussen
- Edited by: Terry Kelley; Roselidah Taabu Obala
- Music by: Nami Melumad
- Production companies: Kaaya Films; Muasya Media Enterprises
- Distributed by: Juno Films; Rushlake Media
- Release date: 29 November 2018
- Running time: 99 minutes
- Country: Kenya
- Languages: Swahili; English

Subira is a 2018 Kenyan drama film directed by Ravneet Sippy Chadha. It was selected as the Kenyan entry for the Best International Feature Film at the 92nd Academy Awards, but it was not nominated.

== Synopsis ==
Subira, played by Brenda Wairimu, a young girl from Lamu who fights to achieve her dream of swimming in the ocean despite customs, traditions and an arranged marriage.

== Cast ==
- Brenda Wairimu as Subira
- Tirath Padam as Taufiq
- Nice Githinji as Mwana
- Ali Mwangola as Adam Hussein
- Melvin Alusa as Nick
- Ahmed as Young Majid
- Joan Arigi as Makui
- Audrey as Patricia
- Azza Bakkar as Sara
- Wambui Gitobu as Girl at swimming pool
- Mohammed Hussein Hajj as Older Majid
- Fatuo Hassan as Fatma
- Walter Keyombe as Geofrey
- Susan Khadide as Bibi
- Lawrence Kieru Maina as Waiter
- Tony Make as Dad of small girl
- Awad Musa as Bwanaadi
- Zoa Nassoro Mwamzandi as Qaddi
- Abubakar Mwenda as Ali
- Barke Mwenye as Madrassa teacher
- Sitawa Namwalia as Book shop owner
- Godfrey Odhiambo as Askari
- Clifford B. Okumu as Shopkeep keeper
- Zeenat Ali Omar as Young Subira
- Amina Ramadhani as the Muslim girls hostel receptionist
- Hindu Salim as Aunty Naseem
- Nassir Faraj Shabani as Mohammed
- Inya Shee as Younger Noor
- Chadha Sahiba Singh as Girl 1 / Sahiba
- David Tsuma as Abdul Karim
- Chandani Vay as Alisha
- Shirleen Wangari as Waitress
- Chantelle Winnie as Older Noor

== Awards ==
During the 2018 Kalasha International Film and Tv Awards, Subira had fourteen nominations with 5 wins from them.

Awarding organization	Category	Year	Nominee	Result
Emden International Film Festival	Best Feature Film	2019	Subira	Nominated
Emden International Film Festival	Best Film	2019	Subira	Nominated
Emden International Film Festival	Best Score	2019	Subira	Nominated
African Movie Academy Awards	Best Original Soundtrack	2019	Subira	Nominated
African Movie Awards	Best First Feature by a Director	2019	Ravneet Sippy Chadha	Nominated
Kalasha International Film and TV Awards	Best Picture	2018	Ravneet Sippy Chadha Vibeke Muasya	Won
Kalasha International Film and TV Awards	Best Director	2018	Ravneet Sippy Chadha	Won
Kalasha International Film and TV Awards	Best Editting	2018	Terry Kelly Roselidah Taabu Obala	Won
Kalasha International Film and TV Awards	Best Lead Actress	2018	Brenda Wairimu	Won
Kalasha International Film and TV Awards	Best Lead Actor Film	2018	Tirath Padam	Nominated
Kalasha International Film and TV Awards	Best Supporting Actress Film	2018	Nice Githinji	Nominated
Kalasha International Film and TV Awards	Best Supporting Actor Film	2018	Ali Mwangola	Nominated
Kalasha International Film and TV Awards	Best Production Designer	2018	Samuel Koigi	Nominated
Kalasha International Film and TV Awards	Best Screenplay	2018	Subira	Nominated
Kalasha International Film and TV Awards	Best Lighting	2018	Saul Ogada	Won
Kalasha International Film and TV Awards	Best Special Effects	2018	Steve Ominde	Nominated
Kalasha International Film and TV Awards	Best Local Language Film	2018	Subira	Nominated
Kalasha International Film and TV Awards	Best Cinematography	2018	Subira	Nominated
Kalasha International Film and TV Awards	Best Sound	2018	Frankline Jones	Nominated

== See also ==
- List of submissions to the 92nd Academy Awards for Best International Feature Film
- List of Kenyan submissions for the Academy Award for Best International Feature Film
