= Phina =

Tanzanian musical, singer and songwriter

- Also known as: Saraphina
- Born: Sarah Michael Kitinga; 1996 (age 29–30); Bariadi
- Musical career
- Genres: Bongo; AfroBeat
- Occupations: Singer; Musician; Music producer; Songwriter
- Instruments: Keyboard; guitar
- Years active: 2018–present
- Label: Phina Management

Sarah Michael Kitinga (born 1996), professionally known as Phina or Saraphina, is a Tanzanian singer and songwriter. She gained prominence in the Tanzanian music industry through songs such as Rara, Superwoman, Manu, Sponsor, Sisi Ndo Wale, and Upo Nyonyo.

The latter was ranked number 62 by Nigerian music platform NotJustOk in its list of the best Tanzanian songs of the decade (2012–2022). She has collaborated with East African musicians, including Jux, Otile Brown, Jay Melody, and Ruby.

== Career ==
Began her career as a singer when she was six years old, singing at her school and church choir. During her time at St. Mary Goreti Secondary School, she was given an opportunity to lead a school choir called "Angels of Herald". Upon being admitted at the University of Dar es Salaam, Phina joined a praise and worship team. She attended different karaoke competitions and won the Mi–casa Lounge Karaoke competition.

In 2018, she participated in Bongo Star Search (BSS) and won it that same year.

In 2021, released her first single In Love, which was not commercially successful until she came up with her hit song Upo nyonyo in 2022, the song introduced her in the music industry and was later named by Notjustok as one of the top Tanzanian songs of 2023.

In 2022, changed her stage name from Saraphina to Phina.

In 2023, collaborated with different music heavyweights such as Otile Brown, Jux, Jay Melody and more.

== Awards and nomination ==
Tanzania Music Awards 2021 – (Best upcoming artist & Best female performer)

Tanzania Music Awards 2022 – (Best female performer & Best East Africa collaboration – Super woman ft Otile Brown)

Sound City MVP awards – Nomination for the best upcoming artist.

== Commercial activities ==
In 2022, she served as a brand influencer for Coca-Cola. In 2023, she took on the role of a Guinness beer brand influencer, and she also became an influencer for the InDrive.

In 2022, she signed a distribution deal with Ziiki Follow her friend Unique

== External references ==
- https://singersroom.com/best-african-songs-to-expand-your-musical-horizons/
- https://afrikalyrics.com/artist/phina
- https://www.mzukakibao.com/phina-biography/
- https://www.musicinafrica.net/directory/phina
