= Brenda Wairimu =

Kenyan actress and model

Brenda Wairimū
- Born: Brenda Wairimu; 3 May 1989 (age 37); Mombasa, Kenya
- Citizenship: Kenyan
- Education: Bachelor of Science in International Business Administration
- Alma mater: United States International University Africa
- Occupations: Actress; model
- Years active: 2009–present
- Known for: Mali; Shuga; Disconnect
- Children: Amor Njeri Owino

Brenda Wairimū (born 3rd May 1989) is a Kenyan actress and model. She played Lulu Mali in the soap opera Mali.

== Early life and education ==
Brenda Wairimū was born on 3rd May 1989 and raised in Mombasa. She studied International Business Management at USIU-Africa, and had a minor in Broadcast Media.

== Personal life ==
She was married to Kenyan gospel musician Juliani, with whom she had a daughter: Amor Njeri Owino, born in 2015.

== Career ==
Wairimū has appeared in several television series. In 2009, she made her debut in television when she was cast as one of the actresses in Changing Times. She played Shareefah with an ensemble cast including Nice Githinji and Ian Mūgoya. In 2011, she was cast as one of the lead characters in the Kenyan soap opera Mali. She played Lulu, a bubbly daughter of Gregory Mali and Mabel. She played alongside Mkamzee Mwatela, Mumbi Maina and Daniel Peter. In 2012, Wairimū starred in the Pan-African drama Shuga, as Dala, a 22-year-old communication student. She is the major actress on Monica playing the title role, a Showmax original that also airs on Maisha Magic East, which was released on 3 July 2018. In 2019 she played Edna in Best Friends Forever, a miniseries for which she was nominated for Best Supporting Actress - Film at the 2019 Kalasha Awards.

== Filmography ==
=== Television ===
Year	Project	Role	Notes
2010–2011	Changing Times	Patricia "Shareefah"	Cast,
2011–2015	Mali	Lulu Mali	Cast, Series regular
2012	Shuga	Dala	Cast, Series regular; 6 episodes – Season 2
2013–2014	Kona	Pamela Oyange	Cast, Series regular; 250 episodes
2015–2016	Skandals kibao	Kiki	Cast, Series regular
2018–2021	Monica	Monica	Cast, Series regular; 26 episodes
2023	Zari	Lola	Cast
2020	Selina	Rossette	Cast
2019	Best Friends Forever	Edna	Cast
2013	Kona	Pamela Oyange	Cast
2012 2025	Shuga Ayana	Dala Asha	Cast Cast, Series Regular

=== Films ===
Year	Project	Role	Notes
2017	18 Hours		Co-producer
2018	Disconnect	Celine	Cast, Co-producer
2018	Subira	Subira	Cast
2022	Disconnect: The Wedding Planner	Celine	Cast
2023	Dice	Ruth	Cast, TV series
2018	Wavamizi	Fatma	Cast
2020	Blurred		Executive producer
2014	Naku penta Naku Taka	A tribal leader	Cast

== Nominations and awards ==
Year	Award	category	Show	Result
2019	Kalasha International Film and TV Awards	Best Supporting Actress Film	Best Friends Forever	Nominated
2018	Kalasha International Film and TV Awards	Best Lead Actress Film	Subira	Won
