= Jay Melody =

Tanzanian singer and songwriter (born 1997)

- Born: June 12, 1997 (age 28) Kasulu, Kigoma, Tanzania
- Occupations: Singer; musician; music producer; songwriter
- Instruments: Keyboard; guitar
- Years active: 2018–present
- Labels: Independent

Sharif Said Juma (born 12 June 1997), popularly known by his stage name as Jay Melody is a Tanzanian singer and songwriter.

== Discography ==
=== Albums ===
- Addiction(2025)
- Therapy (2024)
- Mapoz (with Diamond Platnumz)
- Mbali Nawe (2023)

=== Features ===
- Nakupenda (2022)
- Manu (with Phina)
- Puuh (with Bill Nass, 2022)
