= Juliani =

Juliani is a surname. Notable people with the surname include:

- Alessandro Juliani (born 1975), Canadian actor and singer
- Juliani (Musician) (born 1984), Kenyan musician and activist
- John Juliani (1940-2003), Canadian actor, writer, producer, director, and educator
- Peter Juliani, Pope John XXI, Bishop of Rome, and head of the Catholic Church.

== See also ==
- Juliano (surname)
