= Kayvo Kforce =

Kenyan rapper and music producer (born 1989)

- Born: Kevin Ambalwa; May 29, 1989 (age 37); Nairobi, Kenya
- Genres: Hip hop, drill
- Occupations: Rapper, music producer, actor
- Years active: 2008–present

Kevin Ambalwa (born 29 May 1989), professionally known as Kayvo Kforce, is a Kenyan rapper, music producer and actor from Nairobi, Kenya. He is known for his contributions to the Kenyan hip hop scene, collaborations with several East African artists, and the release of the diss track "Kill A King".

== Career ==
Kayvo Kforce began his music career in 2008 as part of Kenya's underground hip hop movement. His music incorporates themes of street culture, social issues and urban life in Nairobi, particularly in areas such as Dandora and Eastlands.

He gained wider recognition following the release of the diss track "Kill A King", which referenced several Kenyan hip hop artists including Khaligraph Jones, Octopizzo, Rabbit, and Juliani.

Kayvo has collaborated with artists including Maluda, Khaligraph Jones, Zj Heno, Lon Jon, Nazizi, M.I Abaga and Bamboo. He also participated in the Coke Studio Africa cypher alongside M.I Abaga, Nazizi, Khaligraph Jones and Bamboo.

Outside music, he has been involved in youth mentorship initiatives in Dandora through music-based community programs.

In 2021, he released the drill-influenced studio album Namba Nane Drill.

== Discography ==
=== Albums ===
- Namba Nane Drill (2021)

=== Selected singles ===
Year	Title	Notes	Ref.
2011	"Death Wish"		
2014	"Walai"	with Davinci	
2016	"Iz You Down"	by Zj Heno featuring Khaligraph Jones, Lon Jon and Kayvo Kforce	
2016	"Glory To The King"	by Maluda featuring Kayvo Kforce	
2016	"I Do It"		
2016	"Sipendi Madrama"	featuring Voste Wade	
