= Faithless (Kenyan TV series) =

Kenyan TV series

- Genre: Crime, Drama
- Written by: Jim Malakwen Carolyne Kemunto Jasmine Maina Ben Muvaka
- Directed by: Abdi Shuria; King Muriuki
- Creative director: Isaya Evans
- Starring: Rosemary Waweru; Avril Nyambura; Beatrice Mwai; Fatma Mohammed
- Country of origin: Kenya
- Original languages: English; Swahili
- No. of seasons: 1
- No. of episodes: 10

Production
- Executive producer: Auka Gecheo
- Producer: Sally Nyoike
- Production location: Nairobi
- Editor: George Mugambi
- Running time: 51–60 minutes
- Production company: Live Eye TV

Original release
- Network: Showmax
- Release: July 6 – September 7, 2023

Faithless is a 2023 Showmax original Kenyan crime drama television series executively produced by Auka Gecheo, and directed by Abdi Shuria, and King Muriuki, starring Rosemary Waweru, Avril Nyambura, Beatrice Mwai, and Fatma Mohammed.

== Plot ==
Faithless is a crime drama series set in the aftermath of a heist gone bad. The story revolves around four church women, who are drawn into a life of crime and violence when their party is turned into a money laundering operation by a dangerous crime lord. The narrative revolves around Esther, a struggling waitress, who stumbles upon the stolen loot and discovers that her brother, Benja, is one of the masterminds behind the robbery. As Cain, a vengeful criminal who suffered heavy losses in the robbery, relentlessly pursues the money and seeks retribution, Esther and her church friends, Ruth, Hope, and Deborah, find themselves facing a moral dilemma.

== Cast ==
=== Main ===
- Rosemary Waweru as Esther
- Avril as Deborah
- Beatrice Mwai as Ruth
- Fatma Mohammed as Hope

=== Supporting ===
- Aleks Kamau as Cain
- Morris Mwangi as Jonah
- Peter Kamau as Inspector Dan
- Arabron Nyyneque as Musa
- Brian Ngaira as Benja
- Emily Achieng as Rachel
- Zawadi Kayyoh as Lilly
- Ashley Kareez Brandy as Tina
- Abubakar Mwendwa as Udi
- Antony Kyule Njuguna as Manu
- Azziad Nasenya as Carmen
- Mark Masai as Henry

== Episode ==
Each episode is released every Thursday on Showmax.

Season	Episodes	Originally released	
Season	Episodes	First released	Last released
1	10	July 6, 2023	September 7, 2023

=== Season 1 (2023) ===
No.	Title	Original release date
1	"The Wages of Sin"	6 July 2023
A riveting premiere. In the aftermath of an ambitious heist against a vicious mob boss, a woman in dire financial straits stumbles upon an unexpected fortune that turns her life upside down.
2	"The Lord Is My Shepherd"	13 July 2023
In the wake of Benja’s tragic passing, a grieving Esther discovers the vast fortune he left behind. Her friends rally to her side, not knowing that Cain is trying hard to retrieve his money.
3	"Thou Shalt Not Kill"	20 July 2023
Manu's tragic fate is revealed as Esther, Ruth, Deborah, and Hope are put in a desperate position that forces Ruth to make a terrible choice. Consequently, they take the first steps on a dark road that will cause division within the group and change their lives forever.
4	"I Will Fear No Evil"	27 July 2023
Ruth continues to experience a crisis of conscience following Manu's untimely death. These intense feelings of guilt and remorse only worsen, leading her to consider turning herself in.
5	"Blessed Assurance"	3 August 2023
As Benja is finally laid to rest, the funeral is attended by friends and foes alike. Also, lasting changes occur within the women's church group of Ruth, Deborah, Esther, and Hope as a defining decision is made regarding their arrangement with Cain.
6	"Remember The Lord Your God"	10 August 2023
Months after Esther left the group, we see how the other ladies have adjusted to life under Ruth’s guidance. Some are thriving, while others still grapple with the same demons.
7	"The Secret Things Belong to The Lord"	17 August 2023
The discovery of Manu’s body turns Rachel’s life upside down, bringing her and Musa closer together in grief. Meanwhile, Deborah becomes entangled in an elaborate con.
8	"The Shadow of Death"	24 August 2023
The police interrogate Ruth, Deborah and Hope. After an attempt to undermine Cain’s operations goes south, Inspector Dan convinces Jonah to undertake a high-risk move that puts himself at risk.
9	"To have & To hold"	31 August 2023
Dealing with the emotional toll of what he did to Jonah, Cain begins to unravel in a way that will have an effect on his operations as well as Ruth’s future in his organisation.
10	"Fallen Angels"	7 September 2023

== Production ==
=== Casting ===
On 6 June 2023, the cast was reported when the trailer was released, with a line-up of Avril, Mark Masai, Rosemary Waweru, Fatma Mohammed, Beatrice Mwai, Aleks Kamau, Morris Mwangi, Peter Kamau, Arabron Nyyneque, Abubakar Mwenda, Brian Ngaira, Antony Kyule Njuguna, Ashley Kareez, Steve Matias, Kennedy Luyali, and Zawadi Kayyoh.

== Premiere and release ==
On Wednesday 26 June 2023, Showmax held a private screening in the night at Westgate Cinemas.

On 6 July 2023, Faithless premiered on Showmax and was released weekly on Thursday.
