= Avril (singer) =

Kenyan actress and singer (born 1986)

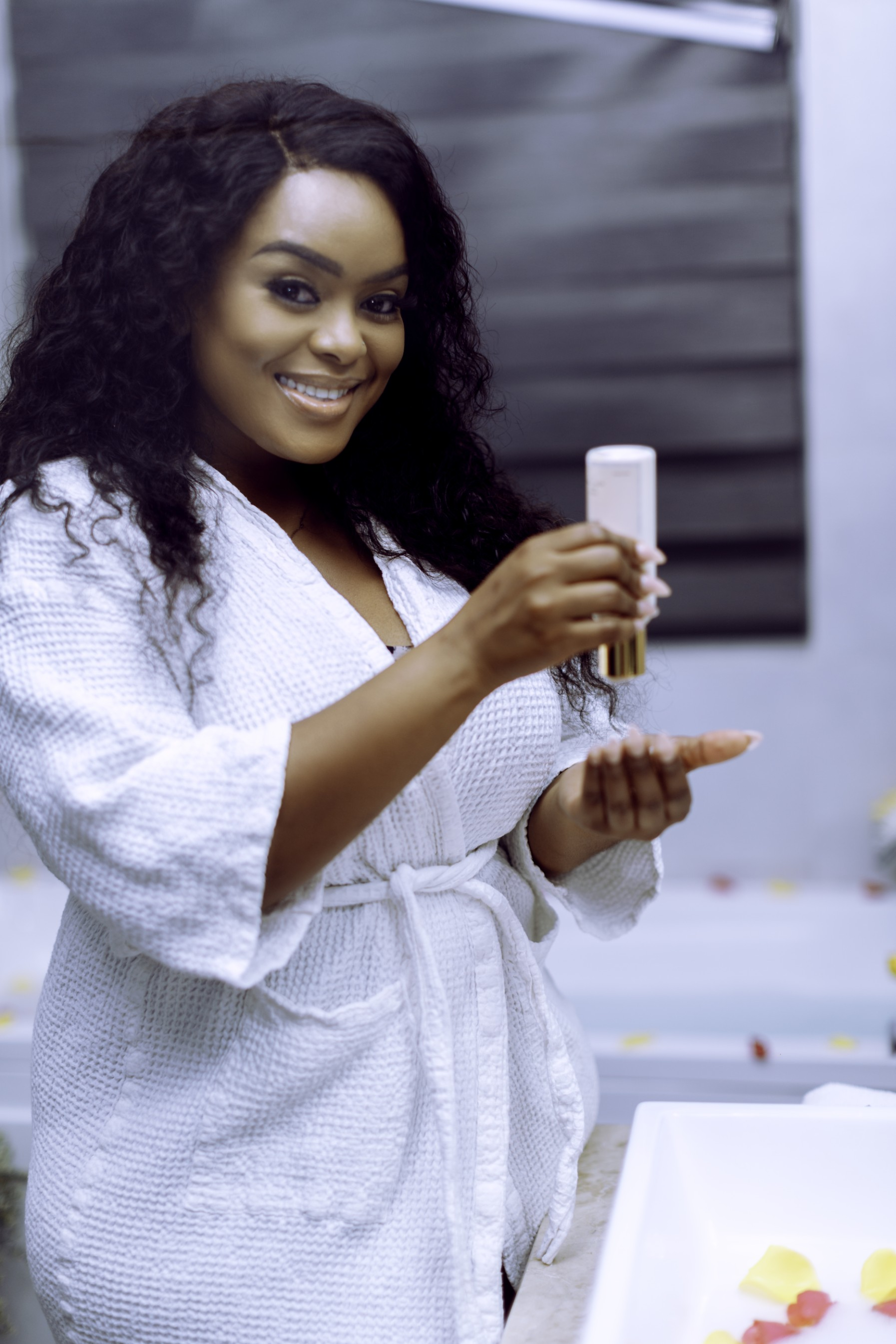
- Avril using a product from her personal care line My Everything by Avril
- Born: Judith Nyambura Mwangi; 30 April 1986 (age 40); Nakuru, Kenya
- Education: University of Nairobi
- Occupations: Singer; songwriter; actress; entrepreneur
- Years active: 2007–present
- Children: 1
- Musical career
- Genres: Afropop; R&B
- Labels: Digitone Music Group (current); Ogopa Deejays (former)

Judith Nyambura Mwangi (born 30 April 1986), who is better known as Avril (/ˌævrɪl/), is a Kenyan singer, songwriter, actress and entrepreneur. She was formerly signed to Ogopa Deejays, one of the leading music production and record labels in Kenya. As a singer, she is known for the singles "Mama", "Kitu Kimoja", "Chokoza" and "Hakuna Yule". As an actress, she is best known for playing Miss B'Have on Shuga: Love, Sex, Money (2012). Avril's contributions to the Kenyan entertainment industry have earned her one Nzumari Award, one Kisima Music Award, one Golden Mic Award and two Chaguo La Teeniez Awards.

== Life and career ==
=== Early life and music career ===
Avril was born and raised in Nakuru, the former capital of the Rift Valley Province of Kenya. She was very active in drama and music festivals while in high school. Avril later relocated to Nairobi to pursue an undergraduate education. In 2005, she partook in the Jaza Lorry initiative and met talent manager Emmanuel Banda of Ogopa Deejays Production. Although Banda tried convincing her to venture into music, Avril remained hesitant at the time. She enrolled at the University of Nairobi in 2006 and studied design. She changed her mind about music during her second year at UoN, and recorded her debut single "Mama" after signing a record deal with Ogopa Deejays. The song was released in 2009 and was sent to radio stations across Kenya. Avril was later featured on Colonel Mustapha's "Mtaani dot com" (sometimes stylized as "mtaani.com"). The song's music video was released and uploaded to YouTube on 15 October 2009.

Avril started gaining prominence after being featured on the remix of A.Y's 2010 single "Leo". Her collaborative single with Sudanese singer Lam, titled "Changes", was released in Sudan. In November 2010, she was featured on Marya's breakthrough single "Chokoza", which received numerous radio airplay. On 31 January 2012, Avril released the single "Kitu Kimoja"; its music video was filmed at a resort on the Kenyan coast line. In February 2013, Avril released the single "Hakuna Yule". In January 2014, she debunked rumors regarding her exit from Ogopa Deejays and said the relationship she has with the label's executives was built on understanding. In March 2014, Avril was featured on the chorus of Boomba Boyz's 2014 single "Piga Kengele". In July 2014, she performed at the Tusker Meru 7 After Party.

=== Acting career ===
==== 2011–12: Shuga: Love, Sex, Money ====
Avril made her acting debut in the second season of the television series Shuga. She played the character Miss B'Have, a celebrity singer who is a firm believer in monogamous relationships. She also played Belinda, a minor character. She was offered the roles after auditioning for the producers of the show. In a 2012 interview with Capital Lifestyle, Avril said playing both characters was therapeutic and that starring in the series was an emotional rollercoaster due to the feelings she developed for her co-star Nick Mutuma. Moreover, she said starring in the series reminded her about the dangers of HIV/AIDS.

==== 2013–2023: Noose of Gold (season 5) ====
In February 2013, Avril joined the cast of M-Net's Noose of Gold as Corrine. Avril has starred in several Kenyan television shows, including Skandals Kibao, Sumu la Penzi, Pepeta (2022), and Faithless (2023).

== Musical influences and humanitarian work ==
Avril has cited Amani, Blu 3, Tiwa Savage, Liquideep, Alicia Keys and Beyoncé as musicians who inspired her. She also cited Michael Jackson, Kenny Rogers, Alicia Keys and Beyoncé as her favourite artists. Her inspiration to write and record music stems from her life experiences. Avril has been involved in several humanitarian campaigns, including the Chagua Amani Peace Campaign and Kenya Land Alliance. In February 2015, she became one of East Africa's ambassadors for Oriflame Sweden and AMREF's Save an African Mother Campaign.

== Discography ==
Studio albums

- Spirit (2022)
- Be Kind (EP) (2022)

Singles

Year	Title	Album	Ref
2009	"Mama"	Non-album single	
2009	"Mtaani dot com" (Colonel Mustapha featuring Avril)	Non-album single	
2010	"Leo" (Remix) (AY featuring Avril)	Non-album single	
2010	"Chokoza" (Marya featuring Avril)	Non-album single	
2012	"Kitu Kimoja"	Non-album single	
2013	"Hakuna Yule"	Non-album single	
2014	"Piga Kengele" (Boomba Boyz featuring Avril)	Non-album single	
2014	"Nikimuona"	Non-album single	
2015	"Hello Baby"(Avril featuring Ommy Dimpoz)	Non-album single	
2015	"Ninaweza"(Avril featuring Rabbit-Kaka Sungura)	Non-album single	
2015	"No Stress" (Avril featuring AY)	Non-album single	

== Filmography ==
=== Films ===
Films
Year	Title	Role	Notes	Ref
	Behind the Veil			
	The Checklist		Produced by SpielWorks Media	
2017	World Tofauti	Nina	Produced by Kang'ethe Mungai	

=== Television ===
Television
Year	Title	Role	Notes	Ref
2012	Mali	Atiah	Recurring role	
2013	Shuga	Miss B'Have/Belinda	Main cast (season 2)	
2013–present	Sumu la Penzi	Eva	Main cast	
2014	Noose of Gold	Corrine	Recurring cast (season 5)	
2015–16	Skandals Kibao	Karen	Supporting actress	
2017	Varshita	Scarlet	Guest role	
2017	Auntie Boss!		Guest role	
2022	Pepeta	Nduta	Supporting actress	
2023	Faithless	Deborah	Lead role	

== Awards and nominations ==
Year	Event	Category	Recipient	Result	Ref
2010	Channel O Music Video Awards	Most Gifted East Video	"Mama"	Nominated	
2010	Museke Online Africa Music Awards	Best African Collaboration	"Leo" (Remix) (AY featuring Avril)	Nominated	
2010	Nzumari Awards	Best Female Artiste	Herself	Won	
2011	Chaguo La Teeniez Awards	Best Female Artiste	Herself	Won	
2011	Golden Mic Awards	Most Promising Artiste	Herself	Won	
2011	Teen Choice Awards	Best Female Artist	Herself	Won	
2011	Pearl of Africa Music Awards	Best Female Artist	Herself	Nominated	
2011	Nzumari Awards	Best Female Artiste	Herself	Nominated	
2012	Kisima Music Awards	Best Boomba Artist	Herself	Won	
2012	Chaguo La Teeniez Awards	Best Female Artiste	Herself	Won	
2015	Pulse Music Video Awards	Best Female Artist of the Year	Herself	Won	
2016	Kora Awards	Best Female Artist – East Africa	Herself	—N/a	
2018	Mdundo Awards	Most Downloaded Afropop	Herself	Nominated	
