= Wingu la Moto =

- Genre: Soap opera Drama
- Created by: Simiyu Barasa
- Starring: Nini Wacera; Ken Ambani; Benta Ochieng
- Country of origin: Kenya
- Original languages: English; Swahili
- No. of seasons: 1

Production
- Production location: Nairobi
- Running time: 22–27 minutes

Original release
- Network: NTV
- Release: 2003 – 2006

Wingu la moto (Lit: Cloud of Fire) is a Kenyan soap opera that aired on NTV from 2003 to 2006.

== Premise ==
It depicted greed, deceit and forbidden relationships.

== Cast ==
- Nini Wacera as Suzanne
- Ken Ambani
- Benta Ochieng
- Esther Kahuha
- Wanja Mworia
- Cindy Kahuha

== Release ==
Nation TV confirmed to air Wingu la moto from 2003. It aired every Wednesday at 20:00 EAT. The series ended in 2006.
