= Shrekeezy =

Kenyan rapper (1993–2015)

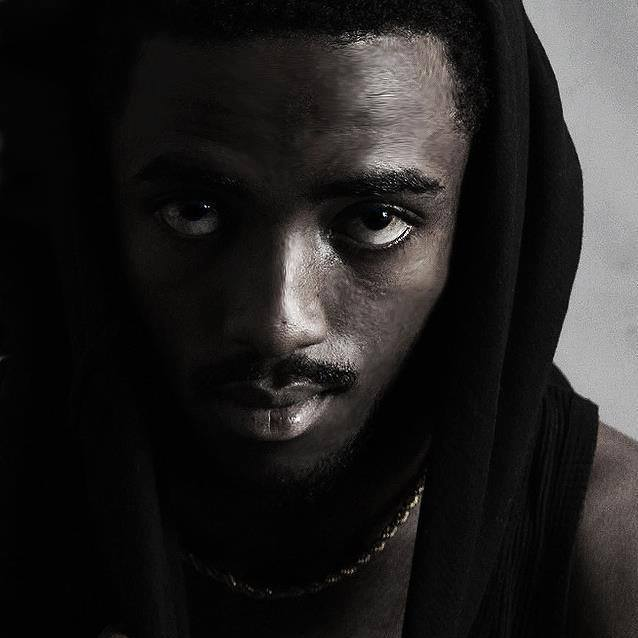

Background information
- Born: Simon Njoroge; 24 October 1993; Nakuru, Kenya
- Died: 30 August 2015 (aged 21) Mbudya Island, Tanzania
- Genres: Alternative hip hop, trip hop, contemporary R&B, afro beat
- Occupations: Entrepreneur, Event Organizer TV presenter, radio host, singer-songwriter
- Years active: 2011–2015
- Website: www.shrekeezy.com

Simon Njoroge (24 October 1993 – 30 August 2015), popularly known as Shrekeezy, was a Kenyan advertising strategist. He was also largely involved in art and entertainment as a radio host, TV presenter, rapper, DJ and Entertainment Executive. He first gained major attention for his successful online radio show Shrekeezy Live which was later taken up as a daily radio show on Hero Radio Kenya after gaining over 40,000 fans on social media. As a marketing executive at Hero Radio, Simon developed huge interest on Internet marketing and took part-time classes with Chartered Institute of Marketing. During this period, he played a major role in marketing muicbook.com, a social networking site that was founded by his colleague and close friend Samuel Keige. The site was however sold to Afroleo.com. He left Kenya a year later to be the personal assistant of Tanzania-based Indian entrepreneur Nilesh Bhatt. He later that year joined Pilipili Entertainment, a Tanzanian film production company owned by Nilesh Bhatt as the marketing manager. He had since worked as a Digital Strategist in major East African Advertising agencies like Scanad, MetropolitanRepublic, Express DDB and BrandVision Advertising.

As an entrepreneur and investor, Shrekeezy co-owned Trans Africa events, an event organizing company based in Tanzania and is the founder and acting CEO of Phorex East Africa a modelling and PR agency operating across the East Africa region. He founded The Nigerian Festival in Tanzania (Naija Fest), Tanzania Social Media Awards (TSOMA Awards) and the upcoming East Africa Awards known as Mashariki Awards to be held in December 2015 at the Carnivore Nairobi. He was also largely involved in planning the Club Music Video Awards in Uganda in 2013 in partnership with ROCKSTAR4000/Sony MUSIC AFRICA.

On the morning of 29 August 2015. Shrekeezy decided to take a boat ride from Whitesands Hotel to Mbundya island in Dar Tanzania before drowning.

Before dying, Shreekezy posted a photo of the same island that took his life on Instagram captioned; "The boat ride from #WhiteSandsHotel to #MbundyaIsland is the scariest thing I’ve experienced in a long time,But am here……..#TanzaniaDay8." His body went missing after the ordeal but was found after a three-day-search.

== Life and career ==
=== Early life(Music Artist) ===
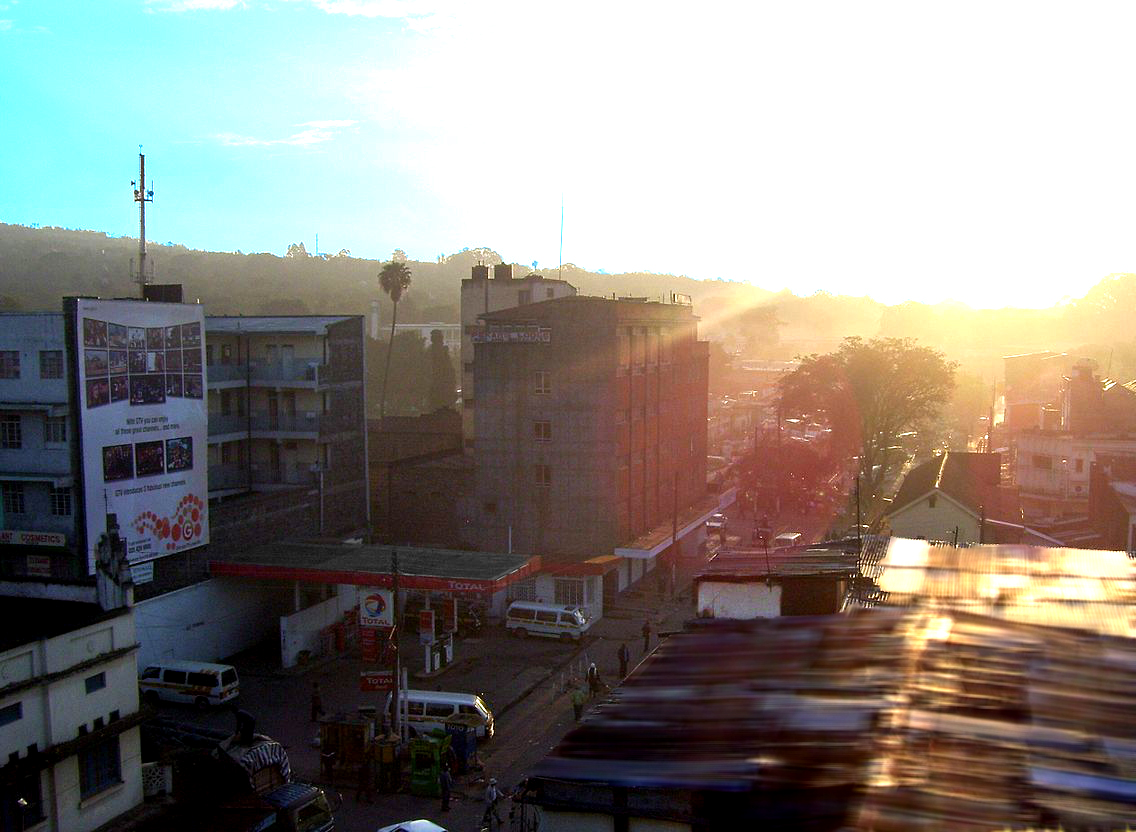
Nakuru, Kenya the town where Simon grew up.

Shrekeezy was born Simon Njoroge in Nakuru, Kenya. He is from a family of three. He developed an interest in technology and art at age 10. After completing his secondary school Education, he moved to Nairobi at the age of 17. During this period, Simon got to meet several stakeholders in the Kenyan music industry who inspired him to join the Kenyan media. He regularly appeared on the WAPI (Words And Pictures) Concert Freestyle battles where he met media personalities that helped circulate his music.

Shrekeezy met up with Kenyan popular MC and media personality DNG who grew interest to his music and called him up for a radio interview at a Kenyan popular radio station 97.1 One FM where he was an evening radio host of the Fired Up Radio show. DNG played a big role in circulating his music during the time. He later went back to his hometown Nakuru for a while where he learn of a radio station being launched. He developed interest in radio hosting, inspired and motivated by DNG, he approached the radio station for a possible spot for a HIPHOP Show. The owners of the station were pleased by Shrekeezy's presentation during his first meeting and instantly gave him the spot. It is said he started the show SHREKEEZY LIVE the very same day. SHREKEEZY LIVE grew to be one of the biggest radio shows in the region and earned him great popularity.

He quit the media after becoming a prolific digital strategist in Nairobi, he later moved to Dar es Salaam and the Kampala working with leading brands in the regions including Pilsner Ice, Tusker Lager, Kenya Commercial Bank, Airtel, Samsung Mobile, MTN Uganda, and Coca-Cola.

=== Music career: Down For My City #DFMC ===
In February 2014, Shrekeezy released the single down for my city featuring various African artists from 5 countries. The artists included the leading female rapper in the East Africa region Stella Mwangi, US based Kenyan rapper Kanja, Nigeria's afropop artists Wondaboy, Award-winning Ghanaian actress Juliet Ibrahim and UK Based Sierra Leone musician and music Producer Silvastone. The song received major airplay in various African countries and topped charts in South Africa, Botswana, Kenya and Sierra Leone.

== Death ==
He mysteriously disappeared in Tanzania on 30 August 2015, where he was living and working and found dead two days later. He had drowned on Saturday near Mbudya Island, off the Dar es Salaam coast in Tanzania. His body was found on Tuesday after a three-day search, according to a relative.

His remains were buried at his parents home in Kabatini area in Nakuru County, Kenya on 5 September 2015.

== Influences ==
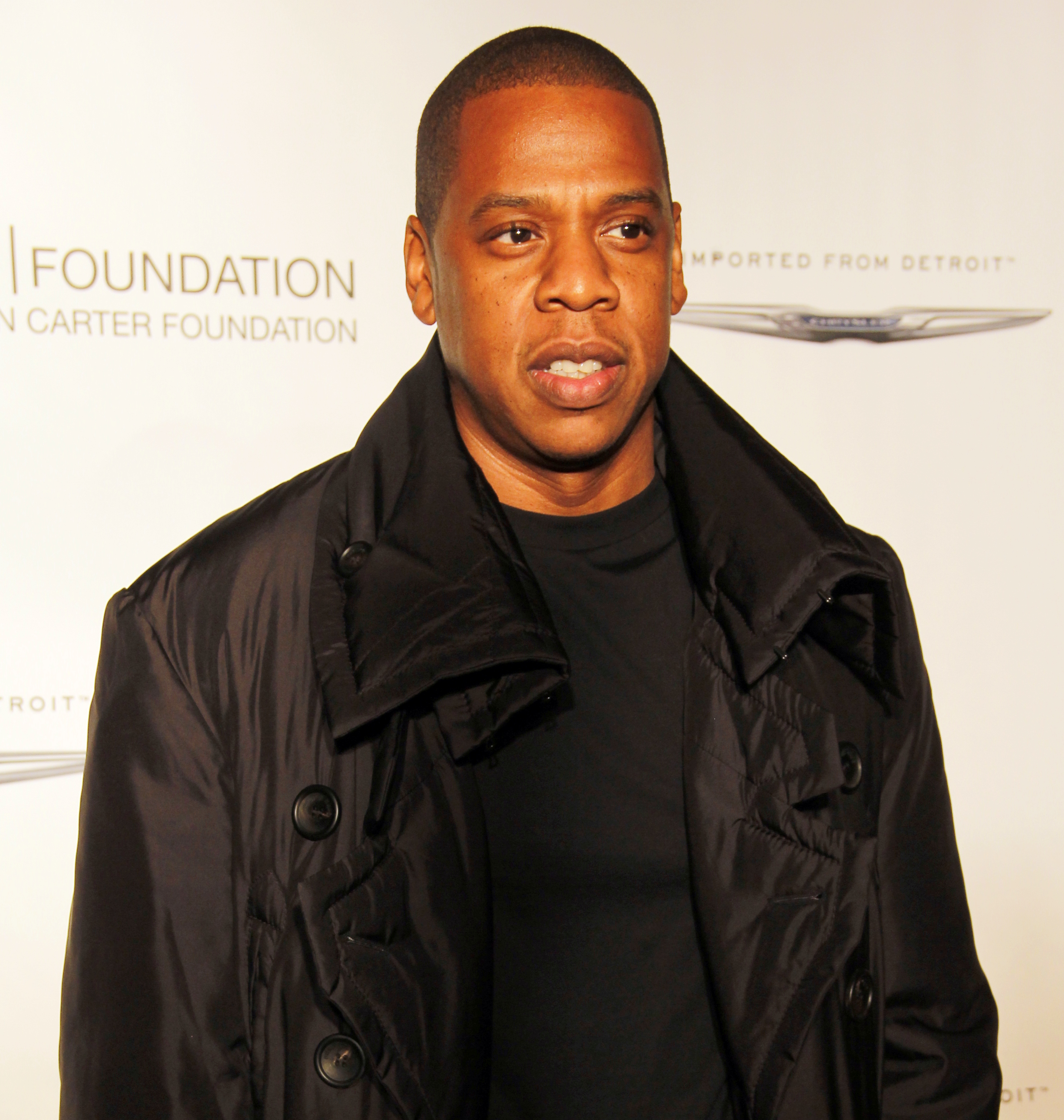
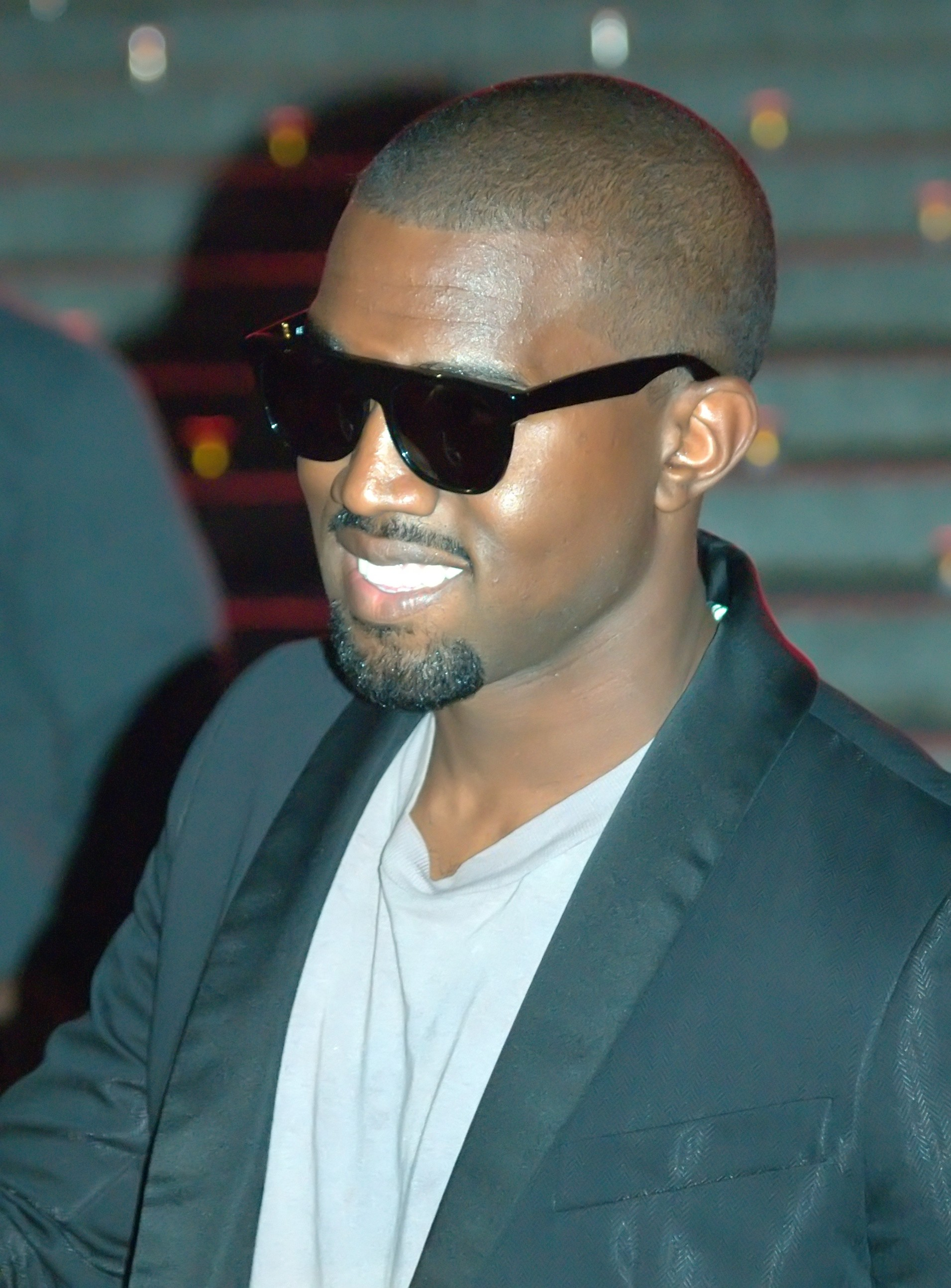
Rap artists Jay-Z (left) and Kanye West (right) have been major influences on Shrekeezy.

Shrekeezy stated that the artists who have influenced his musical style include artist such as T.I., Lil Wayne, Rick Ross and Meek Mill. He's also inspired by Wiz Khalifa, Nicki Minaj, Big Sean, D'banj, Ice Prince and Lil Wayne.

Shrekeezy cited Jay-Z and Kanye West as his major influences, on an interview, he once said;

I grew up with a single favorite rapper. Jay has always been the guy I look up to. I mean, he's just everything, Jay-Z the rapper, the record producer, the entrepreneur. His lyrics are so artistic, every single verse he does is a masterpiece. I also listen to Kanye, his poetry is out of this world, I guess it's a result of being close to Jay. Working with the best makes you the best. However, my greatest inspiration must be the founder of the messaging app Whatsapp Mr Jan Koum

— Shrekeezy

On his media career (i.e. radio and TV), Shrekeezy has cited Tim Westwood of BBC Radio 1, Ellen DeGeneres of The Ellen Show as his major influences

== Activism ==
Shrekeezy had played a major role in bringing together different corporates, organisations and companies to support JIKINGE campaign, a HIV Aids youth awareness program he founded in 2012.

== Performances ==
Performances
Year	Concert	Location	In-attendance and other artists
2010	Naija Night	The Carnivore Nairobi, Kenya	D'banj, Ramsey Nouah, P-Unit, Kevin Wyre
2011	Chaguo La Teeniez Awards	The Carnivore, Nairobi, Kenya	QQ (Jamaica), P-Unit, Camp Mulla, Size 8, Avril Nyambura
2012	LIFE IS A BREEZE	Kunduchi Beach Hotel Dar es Salaam, Tanzania	Keko, Pah one
2012	Serengeti Fiesta	Leaders Club Dar es Salaam, Tanzania	Rick Ross, Diamond, Profesa Jay and Roma

== Awards and nominations ==
Year	Award	Category	Nominated work	Result
2011	Chaguo La Teeniez Awards	Best artist		Nominated

== Discography ==
=== Mixtapes ===
Title	Details
In the beginning	Release date: 1 October 2013; Self-released

=== Singles ===
Year	Title	Album
2012	"Kila day"	Transition
2012	"Greenlight"	Transition

=== Featured singles ===
Year	Title	Artists
2012	"I wanna get paid"	Pah One

== Filmography ==
Film
Year	Title	Role	Notes
2009	Shuga		Cameo
2013	Foreigner	Robbert BOB Macharia.	Foreigner is a TV series directed by Bollywood's Award-winning director Sameer Srivastava and produced by Sameer Srivastava. Shrekeezy is playing BOB the main character on the Foreigner TV series shot in Kenya and Tanzania. It is to be released on 1 December 2015.
2013	Professional con artists	Steven Kariuki.	Done filming, not yet released.
Television
Year	Title	Role	Notes
Super Date TV Show	Host	13 episodes	
East African Countdown	Host	10 Episodes	
Music Videos
Year	Artist	Single	Notes
2008	Pah One	"I wanna get paid"	Featured
2010	Peekay	"Contest"	Featured
