= Petra Bockle =

Rapper, songwriter and singer of Seychellois and Kenyan descent

Petra
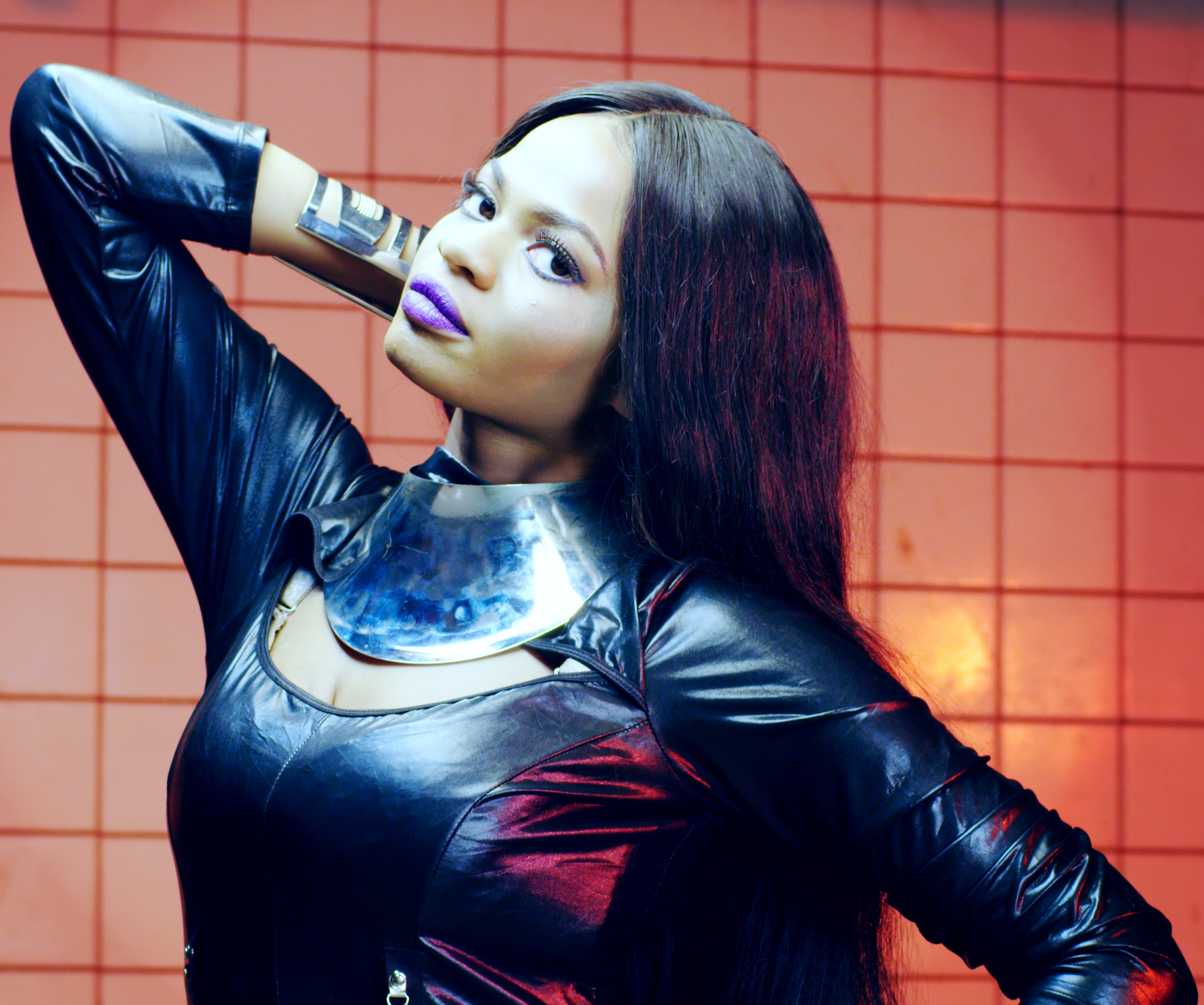

Background information
- Born: Petra Yolanda Sonia Bockle; May 14, 1995 (age 31); Mombasa, Kenya
- Genres: Hip hop; Afrobeat; trap; pop; R&B
- Occupations: Rapper; singer; songwriter
- Instruments: Vocals

Petra Yolanda Sonia Bockle (born 14 May 1995) known professionally as Petra, is a rapper, singer and songwriter of Kenyan and Seychellois descent. She performs in both Swahili and English, sometimes switching back and forth. She cites 2Pac, Eminem, MC Lyte and Lil' Kim as her musical influences.

== Early life ==
Petra Bockle was born to a Kenyan mother and Seychellois father. Her father died in 2004, when Petra was nine years old, She then started becoming active with music around this time as a form of therapy.

== Career ==
Petra first appeared on the "Ligi Soo Remix" which featured her along with other Kenyan artists. This includes: Kaka Sungura, Madtraxx, MwendaMchizi Jay A and Mejja among others. She then disappeared from the music scene for a while. In 2018 she collaborated with Kenyan hip hop artist Khaligraph Jones on a song titled "Rider". In the music video for "Rider", which features Khaligraph Jones, Petra is seen eating raw meat, which was actual raw liver, caused controversy.

A month later she was featured on another song titled "Khali Kartel Cypher". Petra performed alongside Mr Eazi at the Hypefest concert during his Kenya tour. Her latest single "i got that" features singer Victoria Kimani.

== Discography ==
=== Singles ===
Title	Year Of Release	
I got that ft. Victoria Kimani	2018	
Bandit ft. Empress	2017	
Stand Up Inuka	Bambika	2017

=== As featured artist ===
Title	Release date
Ligi Soo Remix	2013
Eish	2015
The Khali Cartel	2018
Rider	2018

== Awards and nominations ==
In 2012, Petra won an award for best female artist at the Kenya Coast Music Awards. Later on in 2015 she received an award for best female hip hop artist at the Pwani Celebrity Awards.
