= Pepeta (TV series) =

2022 Kenyan television series

- Genre: Crime drama
- Written by: Damaris Irungu; Charles Ouda; Abigail Arunga
- Directed by: Vincent Mbaya
- Starring: Brahim Ouma; Malik Lemuel; Dedan J. Onyango; Lwanda Jawar; Avril Nyambura; George Mo
- Country of origin: Kenya
- Original languages: English; Swahili
- No. of seasons: 1
- No. of episodes: 8

Production
- Producer: James "Draka" Kombo
- Running time: 40 - 50 minutes
- Production company: CJ3 Entertainment

Original release
- Network: Showmax/DStv Stream
- Release: 24 December 2022 – 13 January 2023

Pepeta is a 2022 Kenyan crime drama set in Kibera, produced by CJ3 Entertainment for Showmax.

Inspired by the real-life story of Harun “Rio” Wathari, Pepeta tells the story of Junior, a 17-year-old talented footballer torn between the thrills of crime and the promises of soccer. The eight-part drama premiered on 24 November 2022.

The show featured an ensemble cast that included Brahim Ouma, Malik Lemuel, Dedan J. Onyango, Lwanda Jawar, Avril Nyambura and George Mo.

Pepeta won Best TV Drama and Viewers Choice (TV Drama) at the 13th Kalasha International Film & TV Awards.

== Plot ==
Pepeta follows three intertwining stories. Junior is a 17-year-old talented footballer torn between the thrills of crime and the promises of soccer. Kepha is an unforgiving cop with a personal vendetta, determined to rid the streets of criminals. And Biki is an ambitious football coach determined to get Junior and his friends scouted before the barrel of the gun cuts short their dreams.

== Cast ==
- Brahim Ouma as Junior
- Malik Lemuel as Dimore
- Dedan J. Onyango as Zeze
- Lwanda Jawar as Biki
- Avril Nyambura as Nduta
- George Mo as Kepha
- Wycliffe Eravuna as Junior's dad
- Marrianne Nungo as Boss Lady Faridah
- Brian Ngaira as Benny
- Eric Aswani as Dayo
- Fridah Mumbe as Gracie
- Suzanne Karani as Esther

== Episode ==
Season	Episodes	Originally released	
Season	Episodes	First released	Last released
1	8	November 24, 2022	January 13, 2023

=== Season 1 (2022-2023) ===
No.	Title	Directed by	Written by	Original release date
1	"Football Boots"	Unknown	Unknown	24 November 2022
In the season premiere we are introduced to young footballers Junior, Dayo, Dimore and Ade with big dreams of going pro and making it in life, but at what cost?
2	"Episode 2"	Unknown	Unknown	1 December 2022
Zeze digs his claws deep into Junior and his friends as he starts luring them into the ways of crime, while Coach Biki is determined to do everything in his power to stop him.
3	"New Beginnings"	Unknown	Unknown	8 December 2022
Dayo has finally been scouted to play soccer in Europe but lack of proper documents could jeopardize his dream. Elsewhere, Junior's dad takes radical steps to cement Junior in his religion.
4	"Last Supper"	Unknown	Unknown	15 December 2022
Kepha sets his sights on Biki following the interrogation. Dayo meets up with the boys for a farewell get-together. An innocent night ends tragically.
5	"Goodbye"	Unknown	Unknown	22 December 2022
Friends and family gather to lay Dayo to rest. Coach Biki is completely devastated and turns to the bottle for comfort.
6	"Boys to Men"	Unknown	Unknown	29 December 2022
Junior and his friends grow in strength and muscle, performing more daring robberies. Junior and his father have a falling out. Later, a mission goes horribly wrong for the gang.
7	"Episode 7"	Unknown	Unknown	6 January 2023
Junior is haunted by memories of his dead friend. He decides to go to church with Esther. Meanwhile, Kepha is closing in on the gang. He finds a clue that leads him to a corrupt official.
8	"Season Finale"	Unknown	Unknown	13 January 2023

== Production ==
=== Development ===
Pepeta was produced by CJ3 Entertainment and was directed by Vincent Mbaya, known for directing Country Queen and Chaguo.

Damaris Irungu, known for Crime and Justice served as the headwriter, and was supported by Charles Ouda and Abigail Arunga.

Show director Vincent Mbaya described the show as a lifetime in the making, saying, “I had to dig deep into my experiences, especially working with young first-time actors. I really had to go back to my acting days and put myself in their shoes, guiding them through the process, helping them tap into the small things that define their characters. It was a very fulfilling experience.”

== Release ==
Showmax premiered the first episode on 24 November with subsequent episodes released every Friday.

== Critical reception ==
Sinema Focus' Kelvin Kariuki in a positive review described the show as "a drama intending to probe into the duality of the lives of children born and raised in the hardships of Kibera."

=== Awards and nominations ===
Year	Award	Category	Recipient(s)	Result	Ref.
2024	Kalasha International Film & TV Awards	Best TV Drama	CJ3 Entertainment	Won	
2024	Kalasha International Film & TV Awards	Viewers Choice (TV Drama)	CJ3 Entertainment	Won	
