= The Kenya Schools and Colleges Drama Festival =

- Genre: scripted play, dramatised verse, cultural creative dance, African storytelling, stand-up comedy, modern dance, mime, film
- Begins: January
- Ends: April
- Frequency: Annually
- Country: Kenya
- Years active: 67
- Founded: 1959
- Participants: 5 million
- Patron: Kenya Ministry of Education
- Organiser: Kenya National Drama Committee

The Kenya Schools and Colleges Drama Festival is a series of student theatre competitions in Kenya, held from January to April each year, advancing through local, county and regional stages to the National Drama Festival. Students from primary schools to colleges take part, with a total annual participation of roughly five million students, making it the biggest educational theatre event in Africa.

The first Schools Drama Festival was held in 1959, and had its roots in British colonialism, modelled on a typical British drama festival for higher education. An indigenous play first won in 1971. Through the 1970s, the festival became a hotbed of radical theatre, and an outlet of protest against the Kenya African National Union (KANU) regime's suppression of theatre. Kenya's first College Drama Festival took place in 1975, and a Primary Schools Drama Festival in 1981. In the early 1980s, the primary, secondary and colleges festivals were integrated into a single event.

In addition to traditional stage plays, the festival has been expanded to include other modes of drama. Dramatised verse and cultural creative dance were added in 1981, African storytelling narratives in 1997, and between 2012 and 2016 the festival was expanded to include stand-up comedy, modern dance, mime and film.

== History ==
The very first Schools Drama Festival in Kenya was held in April 1959 at Princess of Gloucester School (the present Pangani Girls' School, Nairobi). At the time, only European and Asian schools participated. Opiyo Mumma notes that it was strictly modelled on a typical British drama festival for higher education, and its social base lay with expatriate teachers, inspectors and staff of the British Council, and the participating students.

In 1971, the play Olkirkenyi, written by Irish-language poet & author Brian Ó Maoileoin, together with his students at Olkejuado Secondary School (in the Rift Valley Province) where he taught for three years, became the first indigenous play to win the National Drama Festival at the Kenya National Theatre (KNT). The play, a love story set in the bush, written in Kiswahili and performed by the students of Olkejuado Secondary School, is the first evidence of Kenyan children participating in the festival. Brian Ó Maoileoin thought it was absurd that there never had been a play in one of the native languages of the people performed in the Drama Festival. His vision with Olkirkenyi was to give the stage to the Kenyan youth and to their languages and culture. The play marks the beginning of Kenyan youth using the play format and incorporating their own indigenous language, to articulate social issues that directly affected their lives.

After Olkirkenyi won the National Schools Drama Festival, teachers and interested scriptwriters wrote further plays about issues affecting Kenyans; politics was a common theme. Mwangi Gichora notes that in the 1970s, the festival became a hotbed of radical theatre. However, as most of the scripts were written by or under the close supervision of teachers, the student actors were largely used as mouthpieces to put forward the teacher's opinion on various issues. This has tended to make it a competition between teachers and consultants rather than students and it is the former who achieved fame for the plays performed.

During the National Drama Festival in 1974, Joe de Graft (who ran the Drama in Education course at the University of Nairobi) argued that for drama to become fully established in schools it was necessary to train teachers in the practical skills and theory of theatre, and that drama be introduced in the colleges' curriculum. The year following de Graft's appeal, organisers incorporated colleges into the festival.

The Kenya African National Union (KANU) government's suppression of theatre after the Kamirithu productions in the early 1970s and 1980s had serious repercussions for the development of theatre in Kenya. Theatre was viewed as a dangerous tool that aroused the people's political consciousness. S.P. Otieno states in his article "Content and Value in Kenyan Theatre for Educational Institutions: A critical Review of the Kenya Schools and Colleges Drama Festival" that theatre was never supported in the KANU regime and it was only after 2003 that Moi University introduced the first Performing Arts degree programme. This was further observed in the lack of support in the teacher training colleges (TTCs), which did little in preparing the student-teachers to be drama directors in the schools. It is worth noting that as KANU suppressed theatre in the country, they quietly rewarded those who ignored politics in their productions, especially in the school theatres.

In 1981, Wasambo Were (who was the first African inspector of schools in charge of teaching English) introduced dramatised verse to the festival. This was done to ease the overloaded music festival programme (though the music festival retained 'dramatic verse' and increased the categories). Were then accorded increased status and acknowledgement to traditional performance in the drama festival by incorporating indigenous song and dance as a separate category, to be known later as the "cultural creative dance". The traditional performance form supplemented the scripted play in a festival that was initially play-oriented. This was particularly important because it enabled those schools that did not have a teacher or student who could write and direct a play for them to have an alternative form, which they would use to gain participation into the festival. That same year, Were introduced a Primary Schools Drama Festival, so that students were involved from ages eight to twenty-five years. Colleges, secondary and primary schools held festivals in separate terms until the early 1980s, when the festival was integrated into one annual event to be held in the first term of the school calendar (January–April).

Another change for the 1982 festival was the final stage's departure from the Kenya National Theatre. The location would instead circulate to different regions (previously provinces) each year (with the exception of North Eastern Region because of its hostile weather and bandit-prone roads). This promoted theatre even in areas where drama was not well-known. During the 1982 festival in Western Kenya, away from the capital, adjudicators defied the government by not only including a banned political play – Makwekwe written by Tim Wandiri and performed by Kapsabet Girls' High School – in a gala performance but judging it the winner. After the festival, the adjudicators, led by Micere Mugo, fled the country through Uganda when they were told the state organs were looking for them.

In 1997, the festival organisation added the narrative derived from the African storytelling mode to allow students to express themselves while being conscious of their changing cultural environs. Between 2012 and 2016, the national drama committee has included stand up comedy, modern dance, mime and film in response to the demands of the young Kenyan entertainment industry.

== Structure ==
For many years, the drama festival has been structured such that adjudicators decide which performances earn an advance at each stage. Starting from the lowest, the levels are:

- The Zonal Festival – involves schools or colleges in the zone (immediate location of the institution), and is managed by local teachers and education officers. Winning performers represent the zone at the county level.
- The County Drama Festival – involves performances by winners from the several different zones within the county (formerly district).
- The Regional Drama Festival – involves performances by county winners. The regions were created by the Ministry of Education for easy management of inter-school competitions including sports and music festivals. Currently there are eight regions:
  - The Lake Region – counties around Lake Victoria, including Kisumu, Siaya, Kisii and Homa Bay Counties
  - Nzoia Region – Busia, Kakamega, Bungoma, Trans-Nzoia and West Pokot Counties
  - Rift valley Region – Nakuru, Narok, Uasin Gishu, Elgeyo-Marakwet, Nandi, Baringo, Laikipia, Turkana Kajiado, Kericho and Bomet Counties
  - Metropolitan Region – Nairobi
  - Eastern Region – Meru, Embu, Isiolo, Tharaka–Nithi, Kitui, Machakos, Makueni and Marsabit Counties
  - Coast Region – Mombasa, Kwale, Kilifi, Tana River, Lamu and Taita–Taveta Counties
  - Northern Region – Garissa, Wajir and Mandera Counties
  - Central Region – Nyandarua, Nyeri, Kirinyaga, Murang'a, Kiambu, Samburu, Vihiga, Migori and Nyamira Counties
- The National Drama Festival – involves winning performances from all the different regions in the country.

This structure allows for as many students as possible to participate in theatre and it is estimated that the total participation from zonals to the nationals is roughly five million students annually. This makes it the single biggest educational theatre event in Africa.

== See also ==
- Culture of Kenya
- Education in Kenya
