= Wawesh =

- Origin: Kenya
- Genres: Hip hop, alternative hip hop
- Years active: 2005 – present
- Labels: BLaO Entertainment

Wawesh is a hip-hop artist and producer from Kenya. The Sweden-based MC has been creating a buzz in Swahili-speaking communities in Eastern Africa and the Diaspora via his three consecutive hit singles (Mjanja, Wawero and Wasanii) plus highly acclaimed debut album, "It's Meant To Be".

== Music career ==
He started as a producer in 1993. Under his alias, Kiboy, he also co-owns BlaO Entertainment, a production company involved in many projects including work for international names like Nas, Talib Kweli, Floetry and Capone-N-Noreaga.

Having gained experience in developing artists and creating hits for others, Kiboy wanted to deliver something for the Swahili speaking hip hop community and so he started the Wawesh project combining western-influenced beats with Swahili lyrical flow.

His late-2005 debut single, "Mjanja" was spread worldwide, was a huge hit in Africa and remains a major anthem in Kenya. The follow-up single, "Wawero" with its highly produced video cemented his status in pan-Africa as an artist with serious intent. The release of his highly acclaimed album "It's Meant To Be" augmented this success.

Musically, the album derives inspiration from a variety of sources including African folk, Afro-American Soul, Ethnic European Sounds and other esoteric sources.

In between recordings, Wawesh has rapidly cemented his popularity in Africa, Europe and the diaspora gaining appearances across various media. He was commissioned to contribute to a major BBC initiative (Africa Lives on the BBC/Africa 2005), appeared on BBC 1Xtra's DestiNation Africa (DNA) show, received regular rotation in clubs and major radio networks in Kenya, had a number 1 video on MTV Base Africa for the single "Wawero", was playlisted on MTV Base Europe, and performed in a variety of major shows in Kenya and Europe such as Chaguo La Teenies, Afrolution, K'Naan's Tour, and Jamhuri Day UK.

He also co-founded Watu Wangu - a collective of Kenyan artists in Europe and attracted a sponsorship-deal from Jamhuri wear (as endorsed by Jay-Z, 50 Cent, Akon), directed his most recent video for "Wasanii", and produced an award winning album that was nominated for a Grammy Award.
