= K-Denk =

- Born: Koang Deng Kun Kong; Renk
- Origin: South Sudan
- Genres: Folk music, AfroPop, Hip hop, and Afro Beat
- Occupations: musician, songwriter, artist
- Instrument: Vocals
- Years active: 2020-present
- Label: WangBoy Records

Koang Deng Kun Kong is a South Sudanese born-Canada based musician, songwriter, dancer and artist professionally known as K-Denk. He was born in Renk.

== Music career ==
Denk began his music career in 2004 as a member of the Kakuma Presbyterian Church choir. Denk took part in Tusker Project Fame 2010 representing South Sudan, which was widely regarded as his breakout moment. He has sung with other artists in the past. In 2018, Denk went on a tour of South Sudanese refugee camps in Uganda and Kenya as part of an "outreach programme" for people affected by the South Sudanese civil war. Denk's song Brighter Day was played over the radio to celebrate the 2018 ceasefire that brought an end to the civil war.

== Discography ==
Songs
Song title	Year
Ou kene Guut	2017
Guola n iwi da ping	2017
Wimuon	2017
Happy Wedding	2017
Ruor Nyamar	2017
Thieli paar	2017
William Deng	2017
Guola Ni Wida	2017
Kni ni dhiech	2017
Thieli Chaot	2017
Engu Geri	2017
Ya Hobi	2017
Bakaji Ft. Sweet Angel	2017
Ou Kene Guut	2017
Enijin Kerua	2018
Beautiful Lady	2018
Ou ce jiek	2018
Rew	2018
My Babe	2018
Juzza	2018
Can't Wait To Love Another Day	2019
Ba Guor Ni Dupku	2019
Dance with You	2019
Shine Up	2020
Hope There will be another day	2020

== Studio albums ==
List of Studio Albums
Title	Year	Label	Format
William Deng	October 21, 2017	WangBoy Music Record Label	Digital download

== Awards ==
- In 2011, Denk won "Best HipHop Collaboration" and "HipHop Artist of the year" award at East Africa Kisima Music Awards.
- In 2019, he was nominated in the South Sudan Music Awards in "Best International Act" & Best Video of the Video "Jouza" categories.

== Personal life ==
Denk has 4 sisters and 1 brother. His father died in 1992 as a result of the Second Sudanese Civil War. In 2013, Denk received significant attention when he openly declared his allegiance to the Sudan People's Liberation Movement-in-Opposition, posting a video where he brandished an assault rifle. Denk later rescinded his support for the group, instead going back to music and declaring his support for a peaceful resolution to the South Sudanese Civil War. Denk, between 2010 and 2013 attended Admas University in Ethiopia, and in 2017 graduated with a diploma in music from Daystar University in Nairobi, Kenya.
