= Nafsi Huru =

- Born: Musa Adam; 10 October 1986 (age 39); Mombasa, Kenya
- Occupation: Rapper
- Years active: 2007–present

Nafsi Huru (born 10 October 1986), is a Kenyan rapper.

== Biography ==
Nafsi Huru was born and raised in the coastal area of Mombasa, Kenya. He started his solo career in 2012 with the release of his first mix-tape. Later, Huru released three music videos for the songs Still Strong, 254 - 256 Cypher and Ukweli. Nafsi Huru performs with the Swahili Jazz Band where he is part of the management team.

== Other activities ==
Huru is the founder and director of the Hiphop Hook Up alongside fellow artiste Smallz Lethal. The event entails artist workshops, concerts, and an open market for creative use. Hiphop Hook Up started in 2013, happening the second Saturday of every month, at Sarakasi Dome in Nairobi. The event has grown since to other towns like Mombasa and Kisii.
