= Pray & Prey =

Kenyan dramedy produced by Faith Koli

- Genre: Comedy; Drama
- Created by: Faith Koli; Ruth Achieng
- Written by: Damaris Irungu Ochieng
- Directed by: Peter Gitau; Gilbert Lukaria
- Starring: Maende Shikuku: Rosemary Wairimu; Elly Yang; Kere Kega; Mbuthia Ngware; Muthoni Gathecha
- Opening theme: "Pray and prey"
- Ending theme: "Pray and prey" instrumental
- Country of origin: Kenya
- Original languages: English; Swahili
- No. of seasons: 6
- No. of episodes: 78

Production
- Executive producer: Faith Koli
- Producer: Faith Koli
- Production location: Nairobi Hurligham
- Cinematography: John Tumbo Mbugua; Terence Gicho "Wamanyugu"
- Editor: Caroline Gikandi-Omondi
- Running time: 22-24 minutes
- Production company: DIL Pictures

Original release
- Network: NTV
- Release: 2 December 2014 – 25 July 2016

Pray & Prey is a Kenyan dramedy produced by Faith Koli for NTV. The show spans through the clergy society, the deep secrets they keep, their family issues, blasphemy and the deceit behind the "ministers" of God.

== Premises ==
The story starts with the death of a mentor Bishop. This leaves the three men of God in a dilemma and they in turn have to work together to beat all odds and hold each other accountable as they balance their personal lives and ministry work.

== Cast and characters ==
=== Main ===
- Elly Yang as Pastor Joseph, is a young and devoted to his calling, he brings back souls that have been lost but has one major problem, his wife Cindy.
- Rosemary Waweru as Cindy, an unreligious, ambitious and modern woman who leaves the rest wondering how she managed to get her as a long-life partner.
- Kere Kega as Reverend Abraham, is an industrious servant of God married to Margaret. He is completely unaware of what his son has got himself into.
- Muthoni Gathecha as Margaret, a villainous, manipulative and a partner in crime with her son Isaac as they agree to dumb the latter and Carole's newborn son on someone's doorstep. Margaret does everything in her power to shun Carole and keep Isaac’s dilemma a secret.
- Mbuthia Ngware as Apostle Daniel, a dedicated and overly-ambitious money-minded preacher married to Petronilla.
- Maende Shikuku as Petronila, a devoted Christian who is also wants to climb the social ladder. They are the main preys in the drama; they run Apocalyptic Rapture Ministries and a nonexistent children’s home (which they use to pocket money from donors). Petronilla has issues in getting pregnant while her husband is totally unconcerned. She has tried all odds to get pregnant but luck is on her side as she rescues Isaac and Carol's son and adopts him as hers.
- Sheryln Mungai as Carole, Isaac's ex-lover, their sleazy affair results in an unwanted pregnancy. Due to Margaret's meddling, she ends up abandoning her son, a deed that keeps haunting her.
- Pascal Tokodi as Issac, he does whatever her mom says, that puts him in a dilemma to decide what is best for his life. He later indulges into drugs.

=== Supporting ===
- Chantelle Waceke as May (Isaac's wife)
- Eclay Wangira as Tabitha
- Amalie Choppeta as Rev's Secretary
- Janet Bulinga as Sister Theresa

== Production ==
The title is derived from the pastor's perspective as one seeks guidance to the right path to God, one has to directly or indirectly pay the price. Directed by Gilbert Lukalia, the show was set in Nairobi. It was produced by Faith Koli.

== Release ==
Pray and Prey premiered in Kenya on, NTV on 2 December 2015.It aired on Tuesdays at 7:30 pm.

== Awards and nominations ==
Year	Ceremony	Category	Recipient	Result	Ref.
2015	Kalasha Awards	Kalasha Awards for Best Performance on TV Comedy	Mbuthia Ngware	Nominated	
2015	Kalasha Awards	Best TV Comedy	Pray & Prey	Nominated	
2016	Riverwood Academy Awards	Best TV series	Pray & Prey	Won	
2016	Riverwood Academy Awards	Best Lead Actor in a TV series	Elly Yang	Won	
2016	Riverwood Academy Awards	Best Lead Actress in a TV series	Chantelle Waceke (Note: Chantelle Waceke was nominated for best lead actress yet she is credited among the supporting cast while Maende Shikuku was nominated for best supporting actress despite her being credited among the lead actresses for the show)	Nominated	
2016	Riverwood Academy Awards	Best Supporting Actor in a TV series	Pascal Tokodi	Nominated	
2016	Riverwood Academy Awards	Best Supporting Actor in a TV series	Maende Shikuku	Nominated	
2016	Riverwood Academy Awards	Best Director in a TV series	Gilbert Lukalia	Nominated	
