= Eve D'Souza =

Kenyan actress

- Born: 11 March 1979 (age 47); Mombasa, Kenya
- Education: Catholic University of Eastern Africa (Bachelor of Education in English and English Literature)
- Occupations: Actress; radio presenter; production manager; Director
- Years active: 2001–present
- Known for: Varshita!
- Notable work: Auntie Boss!
- Spouse: Simon P. Anderson (m. 2020)

Eve D'Souza (born 11 March 1979) is a Kenyan media personality, radio presenter and actress. She is best known for her long-standing career as a radio host on 98.4 Capital FM and for starring as the titular character in the Kenyan comedy sitcom Varshita!, a spin-off of the popular series Auntie Boss!. She is also the co-founder of Moonbeam Productions.

== Early life ==
D'Souza was born on 11 March 1979 in Mombasa, Kenya, to Andrew and Martina D’Souza. She has two siblings, Sharon and Jason D’Souza. She attended Loreto Convent and Aga Khan High School, Mombasa. She has come here to join Catholic University of Eastern Africa, Nairobi, where she attained a Bachelor of Education degree in English and English Literature.

== Personal life ==
In October 2020, D'Souza married her long-time partner, Simon Anderson, in a private civil ceremony. Following their marriage, the couple relocated to Dubai, United Arab Emirates, where she continued to work on online content creation and remote production for Moonbeam.

D'Souza is also known for her resilience and advocacy. In interviews, she has spoken openly about surviving a horrific carjacking and sexual assault in 2005 when she was 25. By sharing her journey through trauma and counseling, she has served as an advocate for mental health and women's safety in Kenya..

== Career ==
Radio presenting (2001–2010)

D'Souza began her media career in 2001 when she joined 98.4 Capital FM. Over her near-decade-long tenure, she became a prominent voice in Kenyan radio, hosting various mid-morning and drive-time shows. She officially left the station in November 2010 to pursue television and film production.

Television and acting

In 2011, alongside her business partner and television producer Lucy Mwangi, D'Souza created and hosted Travel Diaries Kenya, a television series aimed at promoting domestic tourism by highlighting undiscovered holiday spots across the country.

Her breakthrough in acting came when she co-created and starred in the Kenyan comedy-drama series Auntie Boss! (2014), which aired on NTV and Maisha Magic East. She played the role of Varshita, a dramatic, high-maintenance woman of Indian descent navigating a chaotic relationship with her boyfriend, Donovan played by Maqbul Mohammed. The character was so well-received that it led to the creation of a spin-off sitcom titled Varshita!.

Moonbeam Productions

D'Souza is the co-director and co-founder of Moonbeam Productions. Through this company, she and Lucy Mwangi have developed and produced some of Kenya's most critically acclaimed television shows in the modern era, including Auntie Boss!, Varshita!, Njoro wa Uba, and Mentality.

== Filmography ==
Year	Title	Role	Notes
2003–present	Freelance	Herself	Presenter
2008	Big Brother Africa 3	Herself	Kenya's field presenter
2008	EMCEE Africa	Herself	Co-host
	Triple Challenge	Herself	Host
2009	Vibe City	Herself	Host
2011–present	Travel Diaries	Herself	Creator, Host, Executive Producer
2013	Mentality	–	Producer
2014–2020	Auntie Boss!	Varshita	Main Cast, Co-Creator, Director
2017–2021	Varshita!	Varshita	Lead Role, Co-Creator
2021	Kina	Guest Role	Television drama

== Awards and nominations ==
Year	Award	Category	Show	Result	Ref(s)
2003	Chaguo la Teeniez (CHAT) Awards	Best Radio Show		Won	
2003	Chaguo la Teeniez (CHAT) Awards	Favourite Female Radio Presenter		Won	
2004	Chaguo la Teeniez (CHAT) Awards	Favourite Female Radio Presenter		Won	
2005	Chaguo la Teeniez (CHAT) Awards	Favourite Female Radio Presenter		Won	
2018	Kalasha International Film and TV Awards	Best Performance in a TV Comedy	Varshita!	Nominated	
2020	Kalasha International Film and TV Awards	Best Performance in a TV Comedy	Varshita!	Nominated	
