= Juliani (musician) =

Kenyan musical artist

- Juliani performing at an event in Nairobi, 2016

Background information
- Born: Julius Owino; 22 April 1984 (age 42); Dandora, Nairobi
- Genre: Hip-hop
- Years active: 2002–present
- Labels: Kijiji Records; Gatwitch Records
- Spouse: Lilian Ng'ang'a (m. 2022; sep. 2024)

Julius Owino (born 22 April 1984), known by his stage name Juliani, is a Kenyan hip-hop and gospel rap artist, songwriter, social entrepreneur and activist known for his singles "Utawala", "Bahasha Ya Ocampo" and "Kilio cha Haki".

== Early life and education ==
Juliani was born and raised in Dandora, Nairobi. He attended Wangu Primary School and Dandora Secondary School in Dandora.

== Career ==
Juliani began his career in music in 2002 while at Dandora High School and later joined Ukoo Flani Mau Mau. In 2004, he featured on the collaborative album Kilio cha Haki, a project spearheaded by Kalamashaka and Mau Mau camp.

In 2008, he released his solo studio albul, Mtaa Mentality, which featured tracks such as Hela and Who Is to Blame featuring Eric Wainaina. In 2011, he released his second studio album, Pulpit Kwa Street, which included Exponential Potential and Bahasha ya Ocampo tracks.

In 2013, Owino released his single Utawala, a track that focused on governance, systemic corruption and civic accountability.

== Discography ==
=== Studio albums ===
- Mtaa Mentality (2008)
- Pulpit Kwa Street (2011)
- Masterpiece (2023)
- Exponential Potential (2024)

=== EPs ===
- Mahewa EP (2026)

=== Singles ===
- Utawala (2013)
- Naona Mbali (2020)
- Total Man (2023)
- Lete Sound (2026)

== Awards and nominations ==
Year	Award	Category	Nominee/work	Result	Ref.
2009	Groove Awards	Hip-Hop Song of the Year	"Biceps"	Won	
2009	Groove Awards	Album of the Year	Mtaa Mentality	Won	
2011	Kisima Music Awards	Hip Hop Artist of the Year	Juliani	Won	
2011	Kisima Music Awards	Gospel Artist of the Year	Juliani	Won	
2011	Kisima Music Awards	Artist of the Year	Juliani	Won	
2011	Insyder CHAT Awards	Best Live Performer	Juliani	Won	

== Personal life ==
He was married to Kenyan actress and model Brenda Wairimu, with whom he had a daughter: Amor Njeri Owino, born in 2015. He later started a romantic relationship with Lilian Ng'ang'a, former wife to Alfred Mutua. He and Lilian wedded on 3 February 2022. They have a son born in 2022: Utheri. His name is Kikuyu for light, with Lilian referring to him as a "light, magical boy".
