= Shuga =

Shuga may refer to:

- Shuga (TV series), an MTV TV series
- Shuga (ice), a form of ice suspended in water
- Shuga (lake), a lake in Kazakhstan
- Shuga Cain, American drag queen
