= Mkamzee Mwatela =

Kenyan actor, writer, and director (born 1982)

- Born: Mkamzee Chao Menyange Mwatela; 1982 (age 43–44); Nairobi, Kenya
- Education: Theatre Arts
- Alma mater: State University of New York
- Occupations: Director, Writer, Actor

Mkamzee Chao Mwatela (born 1982) is a Kenyan director, writer and actor, notable for her roles in the TV series Mali and Stay.

== Early life ==
Mkamzee attended the Nairobi Primary School. She later joined the renowned Moi Nairobi Girls’ School for her secondary education and then on to Saint Mary's for the International Baccalaureate programme. She majored in theatre arts.

After three years on stage (2003 to 2006), she finally joined the State University of New York in Buffalo to study film and theatre.

== Filmography ==
List of appearances in Film and television
| Year | Title | Role | Notes |
|---|---|---|---|
| 2009 | Tahidi high (Citizen TV) | English Teacher | 4 episodes |
| 2010 | Siri (Citizen TV) | Hamida | 4 seasons |
| 2011 | Better days (KTN) | Featured Role | 1 episode |
| 2011 | Aphrodite | 'Her' | Short Film |
| 2011–2015 | Mali (NTV, Maisha Magic) | Usha Mali | TV Series - 326 episodes |
| 2012 | MTV Shuga – Love, Sex, Money | Martha | 2 episodes |
| 2014 | 5th Kalasha International Film & TV Awards | Kalasha Award for Best Lead Actress in Drama | Winner |
| 2014–2015 | Stay – Kenyan TV Series (KTN) | Nubia | Lead role TV Series - 26 episodes |
| 2014–2015 | Sugar and Spice (Ebru TV) | Host | 60 episodes |
| 2015 | Intellectual Scum | Moderator | Short drama |
| 2017-2019 | Country Queen (Netflix) | Writer, Casting Director | Development/Original Pilot |
| 2019 | Lusala | Beatrice | Drama |
| 2019 | 9th Kalasha International Film and TV Awards | Kalasha Award for Best Supporting Actress in a Film | Nominee |
| 2022-2024 | Second Family (Showmax) | Creative Producer, Headwriter, Director, Actor | Telenovela |
| 2023 | White Widow | Akili | Romance / Thriller |
| 2023 | Twende (Showmax) | Madam Mongoose (Voice) | TV Series - 7 episodes |
| 2024 | WIFA 5th Edition | Best Director TV Drama | Nominee |
| 2024-2025 | MTV Shuga – MTV Shuga Mashariki | Writer | currently filming |
| 2025 | WIFA 6th Edition | Best Screenplay TV Drama | Nominee - voting ongoing |
