= Nilesh Bhatt =

Tanzanian movie executive

- Born: March 17, 1971 (age 55); New Delhi, India,
- Education: Bhavan's College, Mumbai University
- Occupation: Chairman of Pilipili Entertainment Company Ltd
- Years active: 1997–present
- Children: 2
- Website: www.pilipilientertainment.com

Nilesh Bhatt (born March 17, 1971) is the chief executive officer and chairman of Pilipili Entertainment Company Limited based in Dar es Salaam, Tanzania. He is widely regarded as the most influential film executive in the East African film and movie industry. He is responsible for guiding the overall activities of the second largest film company in East Africa.

== Personal life ==
Nilesh is married and has 2 children, a son named Kush Bhatt and a daughter Paridhi Bhatt. He lives with the family in Dar es Salaam, Tanzania.

== Early life ==
A graduate of Bhavan's College, Mumbai University, Nilesh joined African Pride Textile Mills Ltd, a family business in 1997 as the chief executive officer. Under his leadership, APTML became the industry's most successful textile company in East Africa, leading the industry in market share for 8 consecutive years. During that time, he oversaw APTML's rapid evolution from a junior company into a full-fledged textile company.

== Pilipili Entertainment ==
In 2006, Mr. Nilesh, along with his childhood friend Mr. Sameer Srivastava founded Pilipili Entertainment, which became among the most successful film companies in East and Central Africa. While leading Pilipili Entertainment, Mr. Nilesh energized the company by attracting and recruiting many of the Film Industry's most talented executives. With the acquisition of world-class equipment, Mr. Nilesh was directly involved with the restructuring and integration process to create East Africa's largest film company. Under his leadership, he has produced TV commercials, hundreds of movies and organized numerous big events.

He has worked in different capacities with some of the most popular and influential Artists, Actors, Producers, and Directors of the past four decades, including Steven Kanumba, Mzee Chillo, Jackline Wolper, Jacob Steven and Rose Ndauka in Africa and Bollywood. In the year 2019, his company Pilipili Entertainment Company Launched an entertainment pay TV channel "Mambo Tv - Swahili" which is available on the DTH and DTT platforms of Startimes and Zuku. Pilipili Entertainment also launched its music arm Pilipili Music Mania which manages upcoming and well-known singers including Rich Mavoko. On 14 June 2021, it launched its second entertainment channel "Mambo Moto" in Swahili language for the audience in East Africa.
