= Kona (TV series) =

Kenyan television series

- Genre: Telenovela
- Starring: Nini Wacera; Lwanda Jawar; Brenda Wairimu; Muthoni Gathecha; Cleopatra Koheirwe
- Country of origin: Kenya
- Original language: English
- No. of episodes: 250

Production
- Executive producer: Laurence Lurie
- Producer: Appie Matere
- Production locations: Dagoretti, Nairobi
- Camera setup: Multi-camera
- Running time: 24-27 minutes
- Production companies: M-Net; Pty Ltd

Original release
- Network: Africa Magic
- Release: 26 August 2013 – 8 August 2014

Kona is a Kenyan primetime telenovela that premiered on Africa Magic Channel on 26 August 2013 to 2014. Starring Nini Wacera, Lwanda Jawar, Abubakar Mwenda, Brenda Wairimu, Muthoni Gathecha and an ensemble cast.

== Production ==
Prior to the launching of the series, 179 episodes were already published. Filming took place in Dagoretti in Western Nairobi. The show was officially launched on 21 August 2013 in Nairobi.

== Plot ==
The story follows the not-so-perfect lives of the Oyange family and their struggles deepened by love and hate. When business tycoon Richard Oyage dies in a grisly car accident, he leaves behind a wife, Ayira (Muthoni Gathecha), his first daughter, Julia (Nini Wacera), the second one, Pamela (Brenda Wairimu) and a son, Wanjala (Lwanda Jawar). Julia later inherits her father's project, a boxing gym, where she has to step into a man's shoes in an evidently chauvinistic society, where men set the rules.

== Cast ==
- Nini Wacera as Julia Oyange
- Lwanda Jawar as Wanjala Oyange
- Brenda Wairimu as Pamela Oyange
- Muthoni Gathecha as Ayira Oyange
- Janet Sision as Wangui
- Laura Walubengo as Mumbi, a journalist
- Arabron Nnyneque as Abasi
- Lenny Juma as Jimmy
- Abubakar Mwenda as Simon
- Robert Agengo
- Cleopatra Koheirwe as Jakki

== Broadcast ==
Broadcasters that carry Kona are Africa Magic Entertainment and Maisha Magic East. Africa Magic Entertainment originally broadcast it on weeknights at 7:30 pm from 16 August 2013 to 8 August 2014, taking exactly one year. It debuted on Maisha Magic in September 2014.
