= Mali (TV series) =

- Also known as: Mali: United by Blood:Divided by Greed
- Genre: Soap opera Drama
- Created by: Alison Ngibuini
- Developed by: Al Is On Production Ltd (Kenya)
- Written by: Damaris Irungu; Wanjiru Kairu; Natasha Likimani; Charles Ouda
- Directed by: Alison Ngibuini; June Akinyi
- Starring: George Ohawa; Mary Gacheri; Mkamzee Mwatela; Mumbi Maina; Brenda Wairimu; Kevin Samwel; Daniel Peter Weke
- Country of origin: Kenya
- Original languages: English, Swahili
- No. of episodes: 326

Production
- Executive producers: Allison Ngibuini; Rio Alves
- Production location: Nairobi
- Editors: Njuguna Mwangi; Hannah Waweru; Christine Gati; Jackie Kabugi; Weslie Onsando
- Camera setup: SDTV 480i
- Running time: 22–24 minutes
- Production companies: Al Is On Production Ltd; NTV (Kenya)

Original release
- Network: NTV
- Release: October 12, 2011 – 2015

Related
- Lies that Bind

Mali also known as Mali: United by Blood: Divided by Greed is a Kenyan television series and a soap opera in East Africa. It premiered on October 12, 2011 on NTV and was broadcast in Uganda starting in 2012. Mali is the first Kenyan programme in its genre to run three times a week on NTV. It is written by Alison Ngibuini and Damaris Irungu.

== Premise ==
Mali revolves around the lives of an affluent family, but plagued with deeper issues that are hidden from public view. The polygamous patriarch of the family is a character that is presented as a chauvinist who runs his two homes like a military camp.

The Mali family members are each have their own character, cultural, social and economic statuses and are all embroiled in tales of love, money, power, self gain, seduction and success.

The drama unfolds when the patriarch, Mr. G Mali, collapses and dies without leaving a will behind. This leaves his two families embroiled in a journey of greed, deceit, division and discovery of horrifying family and personal secrets that would have best remained hidden.

Mali represents the obsession to do what is right but also to get what is owed. Mali shows audiences the journey of extremes that society, the family unit and the individual would go to in the pursuit of love, money and ultimate happiness.

== Cast ==
=== Main ===
- George Ohawa as G Mali
- Mary Gacheri as Mabel Mali
- Mkamzee Mwatela as Usha Mali
- Carolyne Midimo as Bella
- Mumbi Maina as Nandi Mali
- Brenda Wairimu as Lulu Mali
- Kevin Samuel as Richard Mali
- Daniel Peter Weke as Arthur Mali
- Abel Amunga as Mwambu
- Tony Mwangi as Tony Babu
- Conrad Makeni as Fadhili
- Gerald Langiri as Don
- David Gitika as Bishop

=== Recurring ===
- Natasha Likimani as Clara
- Hamza Omar as Zolo
- Nic Wang’ondu as Ron
- Marielyn Perez as Nikita
- Joan Arigi as Miriam
- Carolyne Ngorobi as Selena
- Dan Kimiti as Big Boy
- Kate Khasoa-Kole as Lucia
- Charles Ouda as CJ

=== Featured ===
- Gladys John Shao as Mimo
- Jamal Nasoor as Ken
- Brigid Shikuku as Bernadette
- Robert Agenga as Roba
- Gerald Kingori as Gera
- Charity Odupoy as Eve
- Ruth Adala as Ayo
- Valentine Mumbi as Lazizi
- Odek Ochung as Opondo
- Moses Macharia as Mzee K
- Telly Savales as Nimrod
- Jason Corder as Farouk
- Catherine Kamau as Madze
- Moses Ivayo as Gomisa
- Emmanuel Ikubese as Ike
- Joel Olukho as Seer
- Louise Hanningan as Linda
- Wilfred Maina Olwenya as Kaka
- Elle Mberia as Fifi
- Raymond Ofula as Juma Biko
- Margaret Nyachieo as Saida
- Maria Wanza as Atwoli
- Victor Gatonye as George Wiyo
- Nancy Shiko as Sweetie
- Joan Nimo Kanja as Rukia
- Mercy Chege as Tawi Babu
- Irene Njuguna as Tula
- Boniface Chege as Saika
- Peris Wambui as Sarah
- Kate Damaris as Agnes
- Edwin Saka as Kwalanda

== Awards and nominations ==
Year	Ceremony	Category	Nominee	Result	Ref.
2013	Kalasha Awards	Best Lead Actress	Mkamzee Mwatela	Won	
2013	Kalasha Awards	Best Television Series	Mali	Nominated	
