= Nini Wacera =

Kenyan actress and director (born 1978)

- Born: Nini Wacera Gatere; 16 January 1978 (age 48); Nairobi, Kenya
- Citizenship: Kenya
- Education: United States International University Africa
- Occupations: Actress; Director
- Years active: 2001-present
- Notable work: Kona
- Children: 1
- Awards: 2003 Golden Dhow Award

Nini Wacera (born 16 January 1978) is a Kenyan actress and casting director. Wacera has appeared in more than a dozen films and television series. She is notable for her role in the 2005 soap opera, Wingu la moto.

== Career ==
In 2003, Nini played in Kenyan soap opera Wingu la moto as the main antagonist. The role earned her several accolades. She subsequently starred in films such as Project Daddy, The White Masai and Nairobi Half Life. In 2015, she was cast as one of the protagonists in the African version of the hit series Desperate Housewives .

== Filmography ==
Film/Television
Year	Project	Role	Notes
2002	Dangerous Affair	Kui	
2003–2006	Wingu la moto	Suzanne	Main Antagonist
2004	Project Daddy		Supporting role
2004	Epilogue		
2005	The White Masai		Uncredited
2006	Silent Monologues		
2010	Life in D Major		
2012	Nairobi Half Life		Special appearance
2013–14	Kona	Julia Oyange	Main protagonist
2015–present	Desperate Housewives Africa	Ese De Souza	Series regular
2018	Rafiki	Mercy	Cast, Casting director
2017–18	Sense8	Justice Abdu	
2022	Regina rurală	Vivienne	
2022	Chaguo	Radio Moderator	
2022	Country Queen	Vivienne	Cast, TV series
2021	Escape from Mogadishu		Casting Director
2019	Lusala		Casting director

== Awards and recognition ==
Year	Award name	Film/Television	Result
2003	Golden Dhow Award	Project Daddy	Won
2003	50th International Oberhausen Short Film Festival	Epilogue	Won
2004	7th Africa Cine week	Dangerous affair	Won
2006	Fanta Chaguo la Teeniez	Wingu la moto	Won
