= Auntie Boss! =

Kenyan comedy-drama television series

- Genre: Comedy
- Written by: Lily Joan Wanjiku; Caroline Gachiku
- Directed by: Derrick Omfwoko Aswani †; Likarion Wainaina
- Starring: Nyce Wanjeri; Sandra Dacha; Grace Muna; Eve D'Souza; Maqbul Mohammed; Lenana Kariba; Recurring Stars: David Opondoe; Joyce Maina; Allan Ngujiri; Sifa Githinji; Gloria Owichira; Abdul Karim Athman; Lenana Kariba; John Wagatua; Arthur Macharia
- Country of origin: Kenya
- Original languages: English; Swahili
- No. of seasons: 22
- No. of episodes: 200+

Production
- Executive producers: Eve D'Souza; Lucy Mwangi
- Producer: Linus Kaikai
- Production location: Nairobi Loresho Ridge
- Editor: Victor Oluoch
- Running time: 22–24 minutes
- Production company: Moonbeam Production Maisha magic East production Ntv production

Original release
- Network: NTV; Maisha Magic East
- Release: 16 September 2014 – 16 September 2020

Related
- Varshita

Auntie Boss! is a Kenyan comedy-drama television series. It delves into the lives of domestic house helps in the fictional Taifa Estate (Loresho Ridge Estate) and their everyday drama as it revolves around families they work for and activities within the neighbourhood. It reflects the normal Kenyan culture about relationships the house helps have with their bosses. The story also features a lifestyle of the upper middle class in Kenyan society.

== Cast ==
- Nyce Wanjeri as Shiru; she is quite illiterate. She is easily swayed by more intelligent people than her. At one time she is conned and all the Maingi family domestic properties are lost. Her boss is quite fond of her despite her gruesome nature making her less susceptible to being fired. Nyce confirmed that she was leaving the series following winning of an award at the Africa Magic Viewers' Choice Awards for best actress in a comedy TV show.
- Sospeetah Kiritu as Amos; he is Varshita's loyal maid. Being the only male maid in Taifa Estate, Amos is obedient and knows all boundaries between an employer and his employee.
- Sandra Dacha as Silprosa; she is a gourmand. She often faces criticism for her plus size. She works for Mayweather who has some tolerance to her antics
- Abdul Karim Athman as Cosmas; a mischievous watchman of Taifa Estate. He has his own side hustles. He is money-thirsty and will do any thing to get it. Abdul has not reprised his role for the current season
- Grace Muna as Vanessa, Shiru's boss and Kyle's mother. Despite Shiru's behaviour she tolerates her as she is good with Kyle. Shiru soon quits and sues Vanessa making her hire Njoroge as her new house keeper
- Shadya Delgush as Malkia; Silprosa's former boss.
- Eve D'Souza as Varshita is the perfect example of an upper class boss. She is of Indian origins and girlfriend to Donavan. Varshita is extremely difficult to be with. She leads an extravagant lifestyle that only burdens her boyfriend Donavan. Varshita and Donovan soon move away. This serves as a reference to commitment to the show Varshita
- Maqbul Mohammed as Donavan, Varshita's boyfriend.
- David Opondoe as Victor Mayweather. An extravagant Luo man who is Silprosa's boss
- Mathew Mwangi as Kyle, Vanessa and Maingi's son.
- Gloria Owichira as Ndinda
- Joyce Maina as Jojo
- Arthur Macharia as Brian
- Nick Odhiambo as Teacher Japolo
- John Wagatua as Njeru
- Sifa Githinji as Sifa
- Allan Ngujiri as Babu
- Johnson "Fish" Chege as Njoroge
- John Ndegwa
- Jamal Gadafi

== Production ==
The comedy featured an ensemble cast of Nyce Wanjeri, Sandra Dacha, Sospeetah Kiritu, Abdul Karim Athman, Eve D'Souza, Grace Muna and Maqbul Mohammed. Directed by Ofmwoko Aswani for the first two seasons before he died of cancer. Likarion Wainaina took over as the director of the series. The directors are Eve D'Souza who is also one of the main cast members and Lucy Mwangi. Moonbeam Production released the premiere of the series on YouTube 23 August 2014.

== Series overview ==
Season	Episodes	Originally aired	
Season	Episodes	First aired	Last aired
2	13	2 December 2014	March 2015
1	12	16 September 2014	25 November 2014
3	13	24 March 2015	16 June 2015
4	13	23 June 2015	16 September 2015
5	13	22 September 2015	22 December 2015
5	13	22 September 2015	22 December 2015
6		12 January 2016	TBA
7		TBA	TBA
8		TBA	TBA
9		TBA	TBA
10		TBA	TBA
11		TBA	TBA
12		TBA	TBA
13		TBA	TBA
14		TBA	TBA
15		TBA	TBA
16		TBA	TBA
17		TBA	TBA
18		TBA	TBA
19		TBA	TBA
20		TBA	TBA
21		TBA	TBA
22		TBA	16 September 2020
