= King Kaka =

Kenyan rapper

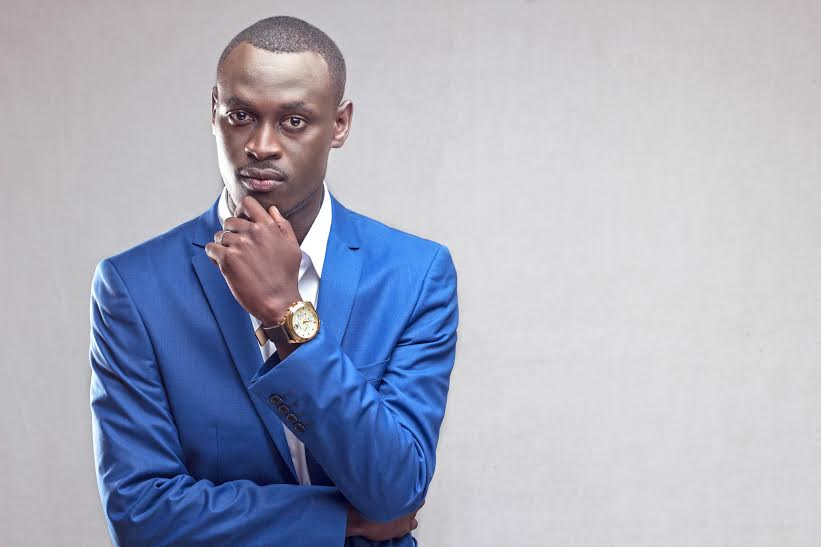

Background information
- Also known as: Rabbit; Kaka Sungura
- Born: Kennedy Ombima; 7 May 1987 (age 39)
- Origin: Nairobi, Kenya
- Genre: Kenyan hip hop
- Occupations: Rapper; lecturer; businessman; widower
- Years active: 2006–present
- Label: Kaka Empire

Kennedy Ombima (born 7 May 1987), popularly known by his stage names King Kaka and Rabbit, is a Kenyan rapper.

== Career ==
In February 2011, Kaka met Jorma Taccone, a member of The Lonely Island, when Taccone visited Nairobi, Kenya as part of his trip for AFAR Magazine's "Spin the Globe". Sungura collaborated with Taccone to create a rap video that has over 1.2 million views. Taccone later wrote an article for AFAR Magazine documenting the experience with Sungura. In 2012, Rabbit launched his own clothing line dubbed "Niko Kwa Jam Nakam".

With his 17-track album Tales of Kaka Sungura Sunguuch already out, Kaka stated that he was solely focused on promoting the album as well as shooting a few videos:

I cannot do another album until late next year. I give my all when I compile an album, that's why I won't rush into another album project."

In November 2012, he released the music video for his song "Adisia".

Apart from his music career, Kaka is also a businessman. In early September 2015, he launched his purified water company, Kaka Empire's Majik Water, using his music brand name as the product's official name. King Kaka has also ventured into movies and series production, with his latest production being the Monkey Business series, which premiered on 17 May 2024.

== Personal life ==
He was married to Nana Owiti, and they separated in December 2024 after 13 years. They have three children together.
