= Kalasha Awards =

Annual awards for achievements in the Kenyan film and television industry

Kalasha Film & TV Awards
- Current: 14th Kalasha International Film & TV Awards
- Awarded for: Excellence in Television and Film
- Country: Kenya
- Presented by: Kenya Film Commission
- First award: June 2009; 17 years ago
- Website: www.kalashaawards.co.ke

The Kalasha Awards (the Kalasha Film & TV Awards or the Kalasha International Film and TV Awards; officially the Kalasha International Film and TV Market, Festival & Awards) is an annual accolade presented by Kenya Film Commission (KFC) with a goal to recognize and celebrate achievers in Kenya's TV and film industry. Entries into the award ceremony are films and TV series that have been aired on Kenyan television stations. The inaugural awards were held in 2009 at the Crowne Plaza in Upper Hill, Nairobi. The awards represent the five original branches of filmmaking: directors, actors, writers, producers and technicians. However, the Academy organizers will advise on whether or not to include more categories as long as they sufficiently represent the entire film industry.

== Nominations and voting process ==
An academy, consisting of a jury of experts drawn from the industry oversees the nomination and final judging process. 30 percent of the vote in the Kalasha Awards is decided through a public vote, while the jury decides on 70 percent of the categories, including the technical ones.

The academy members are also tasked with advising the awards organizers on how to put out calls for entries and come up with a shortlist of nominees from the submissions received each year.

In 2026, there were 185 submissions to the Kenya Film Commission. The public was allowed to vote on 18 out of the 40 award categories.

== 2025 Cancellation ==
The 2025 edition of the awards were cancelled due a lack of funding totalling Ksh. 40 million.

== 2026 Awards ==
The 2026 awards were the 14th edition and were themed "Innovating Tradition, Re-inventing Storytelling One Frame at a Time." Winners were announced on 2 May at the Kenyatta International Convention Centre (KICC). The romantic comedy Big Girl Small World and sci-fi series Subterranea were among the top contenders, receiving eight and seven nominations respectively. Stanslaus Manthi of the Business Daily described the year's edition of the awards as "ridiculously competitive". The nominees for the 14th edition of the awards were announced on 25 March 2026 during a ceremony at Anga Sky Cinema, Panari Sky Centre, Nairobi. Each nominee was set to receive a Ksh. 200,000 prize for every category they were nominated for. Multichoice Kenya received the most nominations of any production company; 31 in total.

To familiarize voters and the public with the films, Anga Cinemas hosted free film screenings from 6 to 17 April.

=== Nominees for major categories ===
Nominees included The Dog, Sketchy Africans, Safari, S.he Gets Me and Nawi (film) which was in the lead for Best Feature Film and had already been nominated for, and won other different awards.

Nominees for Best TV Drama were Prefects, Big Girl Small World, Single Kiasi (Season 4), Kash Money, and MTV Shuga Mashariki.

Nominees for Best Lead Actors were Juma Mdoe (Sukari), Brian Furaha (Owadwa), Joe Kinyua (S.He Gets Me), Jeff Omondi (Kanairo), Alexander Karim (The Dog), Bruce Makau (2 Asunder) and Elsaphan Njora (Transaction) in the film category and Emmanuel Mugo (Big Girl Small World), Melvin Alusa (Subterranea), Jimmy Gathu (The Chocolate Empire), Joe Kinyua (Njoro wa Uba), John Sibi Okumu (Kash Money), Basil Mungai (MTV Shuga Mashariki), and Kelvin Maina (Single Kiasi) in the television category.

The list for the best lead actress was headlined by Mumtaz Dhulfiqar (Sukari) and Michelle Lemuya (Nawi), both of whom received critical acclaim for their performances. They were joined by Gachiki Gachiki (Transaction), Nyokabi Macharia (Sketchy Africans), Shandra Apondi (Memory of Princess Mumbi) and Angela Mwandanda (She Gets Me) and Beatrice Kamuyu (Owadwa). The Best Actress in the Television category featured June Njenga (Big Girl Small World), Mwende Kingori (Paa), Sanaipei Tande (Kash Money), Hellen Keli (Lazizi), Foi Wambui (Subterranea), Serah Wanjiru (MTV Shuga Mashariki) and Minnie Kariuki (Single Kiasi).

The nominees for Best Director in the film category were Omar Hamza (Sukari); Mark Maina (The People Shall); Shandra Apondi (Owadwa); the directing team of Toby Schmutzler, Kevin Schmutzler, Vallentine Chelluget, and Apuu Mourine (Nawi); Wanjeri Gakuru (Transaction); Cecimercy Wanza (Kanairo); Baker Karim (The Dog); and Damien Hauser (Memory of Princess Mumbi).

The Best Director in Television featured Grace Kahaki and Philippe Bresson, who earned three separate nominations for Kash Money, Single Kiasi, and The Chocolate Empire; Nick Mutuma (Big Girl Small World); Likarion Wainaina, who was nominated for Subterranea and as part of a team for MTV Shuga Mashariki alongside Mkaiwawi Mwakaba and June Ndinya; Carol Odongo (Paa); the trio of June Ndinya, Vincent Mbaya, and Davis Nato (Lazizi); and Reuben Odanga (Mo-Faya).

The nominees for Best Original Screenplay in the film category included June Wairegi and Omar Hamza (Sukari); Wanjeri Gakuru (Transaction); Shandra Apondi (Owadwa); Clementina Kabutha and Cecimercy Wanza (Kanairo); Brian Munene (She Gets Me); Jackline Emali (Ngone Mwaitu); Damien Hauser (Memory of Princess Mumbi); Veronika Kotengo (Sketchy Africans); and Milcah Cherotich (Nawi).

While nominations in the Best Television Scriptwriter category were led by the collaborative team of Likarion Wainaina, Brian Munene, Arnold Mwanjila, and Martin Kigondu (Subterranea). Other nominees included Angela Ruhinda (Big Girl Small World); Grace Kahaki and Philippe Bresson (Kash Money); Annette Shadeya (MTV Shuga Mashariki); Bruno Tanya (Paa); and the writing team of Carol Kemunto, Jazzmine Maina, Grace Adhiambo, and Jim Malakwen for the fourth season of Single Kiasi.

== Award categories ==
In 2026, on the 14th edition of the awards, the KFC plans to introduce 2 new categories for digital content creators bringing the total to 40.

=== Television categories ===
- Best TV Drama
- Best TV Comedy
- Best Lead Actor in a TV drama
- Best Lead Actress in a TV drama
- Best Supporting Actor in TV drama
- Best Supporting Actress in TV drama
- Best Performance in TV Comedy
- Best Host in TV Show
- Best TV Documentary

=== Film categories ===
- Best Lead Actor in a film
- Best Lead Actress in a film
- Best Supporting Actor in a film
- Best Supporting Actress in a film
- Best Documentary
- Best Feature
- Best Short Film
- Best Director
- Best Sound Designer
- Best Original Score
- Best Editor
- Best Lighting Technician
- Best Special Effects
- Best Original Screen Play
- Best Director of Photography
- Best Production Designer
- Best Local Language Film

=== Special accolades ===
- Best Feature by a student
- Best Documentary by a student
- Best Diaspora Production
- Best Animation Production
- Best Feature East

== Recent winners ==
Award Winners of Major Categories
Year (Edition)	Medium/ Category Group	Category	Winner (Person/Production)	Work	Source and/or note
2026 (14th)	Film	Best Feature Film	Brizan Were, Lydia Wresch, Caroline Heim	Nawi	
2024 (13th)	Film	Best Feature Film	Daudi Anguka	Mvera	
2024 (13th)	Film	Best Short Film	Matrid Nyaga	Where the River Divides	
2024 (13th)	Film	Best Lead Actor	Godwill Odhiambo	Where the River Divides	
2024 (13th)	Film	Best Lead Actress	Linah Sande	Mvera	
2024 (13th)	TV	Best TV Drama	James Kombo	Pepeta	
2024 (13th)	TV	Best Lead Actor (TV)	Charles J. Ouda	Salem	
2024 (13th)	TV	Best Lead Actress (TV)	Sarah Hassan	Zari	
2024 (13th)	TV	Best TV Comedy	Damaris Irungu	Kam U Stay	
2024 (13th)	Tech	Best Director of Photography	Jim Bishop	Half Open Window	
2024 (13th)	Tech	Best Editor	Koome Mwirebua	Act of Love	
2024 (13th)	Special	Lifetime Achievement	Jenny Pont	Pontact Productions	
2021 (10th)	TV	Best Lead Actress (TV)	Sarah Hassan	Crime and Justice	
2020 (9th)	TV	Best Lead Actress (TV)	Yasmin Said	Maria	

== Kalasha Award for Best Lead Actress in Drama ==
Kalasha for Best Lead Actress
- Awarded for: Best performance by an actress in a leading role in a television drama
- First award: 2009; Jackline Nyaminde; Papa Shirandula
- Currently held by: 2026; June Njenga "Big Girl Small World"

The Kalasha Awards for best lead actress in drama is an accolade dedicated to the best-performing actress in the previous year.

Year	Actress	TV series	Ref(s)
2009	Jackline Nyaminde	Papa Shirandula	
2010	Elizabeth Wanjiru	Mother-in-law	
2011	Nice Githinji	Changing Times	
2012	Lucy Nyagah	Lies that Bind	
2014	Mkamzee Mwatela	Mali	
2015	Ambrose Riziki	Pendo	
2016	-		
2017	Catherine Kamau	Sue na Jonnie	
2018	Diana Mulwa	My Two Wives	
2019	Nyce Wanjeri	Ithaga Riene	
2020	Yasmin Said	Maria	
2021	Sarah Hassan	Crime and Justice	
2024	Sarah Hassan	Zari	
2026	June Njenga	Big Girl Small World	
