= Lazizi =

Kenyan TV series

- Genre: Drama
- Created by: Reuben Odanga
- Written by: Clifford Okumu; Edijoe Mwaniki; Joseph Akwiri; Lucia Shikuku; Rose Njoroge; Shelly Gitonga; Wanjau Wachira
- Directed by: Reuben Odanga; June Ndinya Aaqib; Vincent Mbaya; Davis Nato; Mwajuma Belle
- Starring: Mwaniki Mageria; Jacky Nyaminde; Helen Keli; Isaac Okoyo; Zander Andika; Evelyne Gitonga; Vivian Nyawira; Joel Otukho; Pascal Tokodi; Azziad Nasenya
- Country of origin: Kenya
- Original languages: English; Swahili; Luo
- No. of seasons: 1
- No. of episodes: 68

Production
- Producers: Reuben Odanga; Margaret Muriithi
- Cinematography: John "Tush" Mbugua
- Production company: Multan Production

Original release
- Network: Maisha Magic Plus
- Release: 6 October 2025 – present

Lazizi is a 2025 Kenyan television drama series series that debuted on Maisha Magic Plus channel on DStv on 6 October 2025. The show stars Mwaniki Mageria, Jackie Nyaminde and Helen Keli as the leads. The show is created, directed and produced by Reuben Odanga, the creator of hit telenovela Selina.

== Premise ==
Mark Mbotela is a successful mogul in the sugarcane business in Western Kenya's sugar belt region, whose ambition leads him to vie for the Governor's seat not for glory, but for protection. As ghosts from his past resurface, Mark's polished image begins to unravel. A dangerous love affair, buried secrets, and intense family rivalries all threaten to expose his darkest truths.

== Cast ==
- Mwaniki Mageria as Mark Mbotela who comes from a humble background which fuels his ambitions. He is vying for a gubernatorial position.
- Jackie Nyaminde as Amina, Mark's ex and baby mama with whom they share a son, Shaffie. She is an alcoholic struggling with depression due to abandoning Shaffie.
- Helen Keli as Bridget Mbotela, Mark's controlling wife and mother to his stepson, Richard. She feels entitled to the family fortune and is grooming Richard to take over the business.
- Isaac Okoyo as Shaffie, Mark's free-spirited son that is born out of his affair with Amina. He constantly feels like an outsider and yearns for a father's understanding; he finds himself having a complicated relationship with women and is hedonistic. He is initially unaware of his birth mother, Amina. In an interview, Isaac confirmed that he auditioned against thousand of young men to get the role.
- Zander Andika as Richard Mbotela, Mark's stepson who is the Operations Manager at the Mbotela Sugar Factory and is being groomed to take over the company after Mark.
- Evelyne Gitonga (2025 - 2026) and Azziad Nasenya (2026 - present) as Natasha. Richard's girlfriend. Despite being in love with him, her love is unrequited.
- Vivian Nyawira as Sophie: Amina's daughter and Shaffie's half-sister. Having grown up with an alcoholic and depressed mother, she learned at a young age to only rely on herself to get things done.
- Joel Otukho as Juma. He is a Factory Manager at Mbotela's factory. He is loyal to Mark and has a soft spot for Amina. Having worked with the family and company for many years, he is privy of information that could be used against them.
- Pascal Tokodi as Marcus.
- Clare Karatu as Talia.
- Michael Odhiambo Oluoch as Joram Mcapinde.
- Samson Omondi as Ondiek.

== Series overview ==
Season	Episodes	Originally released	
Season	Episodes	First released	Last released
1	TBC	October 6, 2025	Ongoing

=== Season 1 (2025) ===
No.	Title	Directed by	Written by	Original release date
1	"Episode 1"	Various	Various	6 October 2025
The Mbotela family hosts a party to announce Mark Mbotela's bid for governor. As the celebration unfolds, Joram McApinde confronts Mark, reminding him not to forget the struggles of the local farmers in his political aspirations. Tensions rise when Amina, Sophie's mother, crashes the event drunk. This forces long-buried emotions and unresolved histories to resurface.
2	"Episode 2"	Various	Various	7 October 2025
In the aftermath of Amina's disruptive appearance at the Mbotela party, Mark confronts Bridget over secret payments she's been making to Amina. Meanwhile, Bridget and Natasha, Richard's girlfriend, scheme to secure a marriage proposal from Richard. As tensions among the farmers and workers escalate following the mysterious disappearance of a local farmer, Bridget tracks Amina down in Mwima delivering a warning to stay away from her family.
3	"Episode 3"	Various	Various	8 October 2025
Sophie struggles to care for her miserable mother after the Mbotela Party incident. Mark is haunted by Amina's presence at the party, prompting him to look for her in Matela. The reunion stirs long-buried emotions. A guitar, that was once forgotten, becomes a symbol of rekindled love, triggering Bridget's worst fears as Mark brings the guitar back home.
4	"Episode 4"	Various	Various	9 October 2025
After learning of Mark and Amina's reunion, Bridget delivers a severe threat to Amina that echoes a past she refuses to relive. Sophie begins to question her mother's elusive behavior. Amina divulges the truth to Mark about her disappearance twenty years ago. Bridget destroys the guitar severing any resurrected romance between Mark and Amina.
5	"Episode 5"	Various	Various	10 October 2025
Mark Mbotela's passionate reunion with his first love Amina—a recovering alcoholic fighting to rebuild her life—unleashes a firestorm when his ruthless wife Bridget retaliates with vicious schemes. Richard prepares to propose to his media-hungry girlfriend Natasha.
6	"Episode 6"	Various	Various	13 October 2025
A newspaper article brings unwanted attention to Mark's problems with the farmers. He and Talia begin planning his campaign. Amina's health worsens, and Sophie is deeply worried. Acting on premonition, Amina gives Sophie some files to read later. Joram keeps pressuring Mark about the issues with the farmers. Mark continues to pursue Amina to no avail until he makes a disastrous discovery at her house.
7	"Episode 7"	Various	Various	14 October 2025
After discovering a terrible incident, Mark runs from the scene. A journalist keeps digging into the case of a missing farm worker. Sophie struggles with her mother's death, while Mark tries to ease his guilt by spending time with Shaffie. At the funeral, they still struggle to raise funds until a stranger shows up, raising new questions.
8	"Episode 8"	Various	Various	15 October 2025
A mystery donor steps in to help pay for Amina's funeral. Sophie wants tries to uncover their identity. Bridget pushes Richard to hire an assistant, and Natasha takes over the interviews, for personal reasons. Sophie finally opens the files her mother gave her. Mark confronts Bridget about what really happened to Amina. Then Sophie finds something that changes everything.
9	"Episode 9"	Various	Various	16 October 2025
Mark sinks into deep solitude mourning as the reality of Amina's death hits home. The pain is a combination of the love they shared, remorse for the hidden unfairness metted on Amina by Mark's family, and guilt for the things he knows he should have done better for her. It is a revelation of Mark's deep love for Amina, amidst turbulence from his wife.
10	"Episode 10"	Various	Various	17 October 2025
Sophie stumbles upon shocking information that sets her on a mission- her path leads straight to Mamiit Sugar Company. Meanwhile, Bridget pushes for Richard to get a Personal Assistant to bring stability to the company. Tensions rise as angry farmers go on a rampage, leaving Mark deeply unsettled.
11	"Episode 11"	Various	Various	20 October 2025
As farmer riots shake Mbotela Sugar, Sophie's infiltration unearths deadly secrets—including her mother's poisoning—threatening to destroy Mark's empire from within, while fractured relationships, rising suspicions, and buried crimes ignite chaos among the Mbotela family. With alliances crumbling, ambition turning deadly, and truth weaponized, the dynasty spirals toward a reckoning where only the most ruthless will survive.
12	"Episode 12"	Various	Various	21 October 2025
Sophie arrives at Mamiit Sugar on a covert mission to expose the truth about her mother's murder, with reluctant assistance from Juma. As tensions escalate over missing workers, Mc Apinde's activism, the Mbotela family teeters on the brink of a scandal that could destroy their empire.
13	"Episode 13"	Various	Various	22 October 2025
Mark is caught off guard by a probing journalist, but Talia quickly steps up with a clever plan for damage control. Meanwhile, Bridget is overjoyed by news of Richard-Natasha's engagement. But elsewhere, the past collides with the present as Sophie comes face to face with Mbotelas.
13	"Episode 13"	Various	Various	22 October 2025
Mark is caught off guard by a probing journalist, but Talia quickly steps up with a clever plan for damage control. Meanwhile, Bridget is overjoyed by news of Richard-Natasha's engagement. But elsewhere, the past collides with the present as Sophie comes face to face with Mbotelas.
14	"Episode 14"	Various	Various	23 October 2025
Tensions rise between Mark Mbotela and the farmers' union led by Joram, a strategic court order forces the sudden shutdown of Mamiit Sugar Factory, throwing the family into crisis. Meanwhile, personal dynamics unfold as Shaffie juggles his secret relationship with Olivia, Natasha publicly announces her engagement, and Bridget unexpectedly confronts Joram in a last-ditch effort to salvage the situation.
15	"Episode 15"	Various	Various	24 October 2025
As the strike is mysteriously called off and tension brews between Mark and Joram over farmer share demands, Bridget secretly brokers peace while hiding her own risky involvement. Meanwhile, Sophie grows more determined to access restricted file room, believing it holds answers about her mother's past, as Shaffie finds new purpose and Richard juggles pressure from Natasha and his family legacy.
16	"Episode 16"	Various	Various	27 October 2025
At work, Sophie stumbles but Richard keeps her from falling. Natasha scores big, her smile louder than the deal, her glow impossible to ignore. Elsewhere, Shaffie and Olivia float in their own universe, where loyal whispers and time forgets to move.
17	"Episode 17"	Various	Various	28 October 2025
Mark's political charm offensive takes a dark turn when he's forced to drink sugared tea by market boss Chrispinus Mc-Ojoo, a symbolic act that may be deadly, just as Bridget's secret support to farmers threatens their marriage after a damning package from Mc Apinde arrives. Sophie risks exposure while digging into Mark's past, and Richard's engagement to Natasha begins to unravel, alliances crack under pressure in a world where betrayal is constant and only the ruthless survive when the sugar runs out.
18	"Episode 18"	Various	Various	29 October 2025
Mark intercepts a thank-you package from McApinde addressed to Bridget, he wrongly suspects an affair, unaware it's linked to her secret talks with the farmers he's been exploiting. Sophie digs deeper into the Mbotela Empire under the guise of loyalty, and tensions grow around Richard's engagement and Shaffie's risky culinary venture, long-buried secrets and mistrust threaten the entire empire.
19	"Episode 19"	Various	Various	30 October 2025
With Mark's suspicion on Bridget and Joram's possible affair, he sends out a private investigator to take photos. Joram and Bridget solve the farmers increasing issues in the midst of a chronic illness wreaking havoc on Mamiit factory workers.
20	"Episode 20"	Various	Various	31 October 2025
Sophie edges closer to uncovering Mbotela family secrets, while guilt over Richard's trust threatens to derail her mission. Meanwhile, Bridget continues secret negotiations with Joram, Shaffie embraces his culinary ambitions.
21	"Episode 21"	Various	Various	3 November 2025
Bridget seeks truce with farmers through Union Leader Joram, unaware they're being watched. Shaffie is discontinued from the I.T faculty. Meanwhile, Natasha excitedly goes online to narrow down her list of wedding service providers- unaware of what's looming beneath the surface.
22	"Episode 22"	Various	Various	4 November 2025
Bridget's secret alliance with Joram and Agustino explodes when a PI delivering damning photos to Mark, igniting his fury—just as Sophie uncovers her mother's ties to the Mbotela Empire and Richard exposes Shaffie's dangerous school lies. Juma fighting a tainted sugar crisis that could collapse the business, the family's web of betrayal tightens.
23	"Episode 23"	Various	Various	5 November 2025
Bridget discovers photos that hint at Mark's awareness of her clandestine meetings with Joram, as Sophie finds the "Sucrose Ltd" files suspiciously empty. Tensions flare when Mark confronts Joram over Bridget and his involvement with his rival, Agostino. Natasha receives a chilling envelope from a contestant disguised as a service provider, she is being blackmailed.
24	"Episode 24"	Various	Various	6 November 2025
Sophie cleverly enquires if there is CCTV surveillance and discovers that all footage from the previous day has mysteriously vanished. Natasha is bombarded in her DMs with compromising photos by the blackmailer that could affect her planned weeding. Joram is missing.
25	"Episode 25"	Various	Various	7 November 2025
Mark subtly threatens Bridget over suspected betrayal and Shaffie secretly prepares for his culinary debut, Joram mysteriously disappears—sending Bridget into a spiral when her calls go unanswered. Meanwhile, Sophie receives a surprise visit from Wema just as she plans to lay low, and a viral video of Shaffie's cookout inadvertently reveals a hidden location—where the shocking discovery of Joram's lifeless body sends the Mbotela world into chaos.
26	"Episode 26"	Various	Various	10 November 2025
In the middle of Shaffie's infamous cookout a dead body is found. Investigation begins with Shaffie being a key suspect. Mark rushes to bail him out.
27	"Episode 27"	Various	Various	11 November 2025
A private investigator exposes Bridget's secret alliance with farmer leader Joram and rival Agustino, Mark's fury threatens to shatter their marriage and the Mbotela empire.
28	"Episode 28"	Various	Various	12 November 2025
Tensions rise as Natasha grows distant, consumed by her blackmail crisis-unaware Richard's heart is drifting toward Sophie. Sophie and Wema plot a dangerous mission.
29	"Episode 29"	Various	Various	13 November 2025
As public attention turns to Joram's sudden disappearance, Bridget searches for answers. Juma voices concerns about Waridi's return to work.
30	"Episode 30"	Various	Various	14 November 2025
Sophie unearths images of her mother in an archived file, while sneaking into the file room. Natasha is under pressure to hand over secret sugar documents to the blackmailers.
31	"Episode 31"	Various	Various	17 November 2025
Sophie returns to the file room to unearth more secrets. Natasha's desperation deepens as she finally hands over the documents to her blackmailers.
32	"Episode 32"	Various	Various	18 November 2025
Sophie unearths images of her mother in an archived file, while sneaking into the file room. Natasha is under pressure to hand over secret sugar documents to the blackmailers.
33	"Episode 33"	Various	Various	19 November 2025
Sophie quest to unravel her mother's death lands her into trouble with Juma over her risky tactics of pursuing information that involves forgery and unauthorized access.
34	"Episode 34"	Various	Various	20 November 2025
As the file digitization process begins, this triumphant win might give Sophie access to vital information. Natasha on the other hand is at the bleak of catching her blackmailer.
35	"Episode 35"	Various	Various	21 November 2025
A factory worker falls ill with symptoms mirroring Cleophas' death, union elections spiral into chaos, and the Mbotela empire faces mounting threats from every corner.
36	"Episode 36"	Various	Various	24 November 2025
Natasha plans the perfect dinner but Richard stays late at work with Sophie. Shaffie and Olivia grow distant, their bond hanging by a thread.
37	"Episode 37"	Various	Various	25 November 2025
As the cold war between Mark and Bridget escalates, Richard juggles between his two love interests, will he fumble or will he balance on the delicate thin line he walks on?
38	"Episode 38"	Various	Various	26 November 2025
Shaffie grapples with his suppressed passion for cooking and tensions rise within the Mbotela household, Natasha and Bridget hatch a secret plan to regain control.
39	"Episode 39"	Various	Various	27 November 2025
Mark follows up on Joram's murder, desperate to clear his name. Bridget warns Natasha to keep their mission under wraps. Meanwhile. Juma suspects Waridi is expectant.
40	"Episode 40"	Various	Various	28 November 2025
Natasha dismisses her bestie's playful warning about Richard and his P.A Sophie. A new assignment sends Richard and Sophie on a road trip beyond Mwima.
41	"Episode 41"	Various	Various	1 December 2025
A leaking roof forces Richard to share a room with Sophie. By morning, the road leads them back to Mwima, but with awakened feelings. Natasha's questions pierce through Richard's faltering story. Phyllis discovers something that will make Natasha suspect a betrayal from Richard.
42	"Episode 42"	Various	Various	2 December 2025
Richard steps in for Mark and signs a deal behind his back. Bridget advises Natasha on securing her hold over Richard. Sophie inches closer to the truth, piecing together clues on a mission that won't let her rest.
43	"Episode 43"	Various	Various	3 December 2025
Sophie unearths images of her mother in an archived file, while sneaking into the file room. Natasha is under pressure to hand over secret sugar documents to the blackmailers.
44	"Episode 44"	Various	Various	4 December 2025
Mark's illegal sugar empire starts to unravel when Bridget learns Joram was murdered after their secret meeting, while Sophie, driven by a hidden vendetta and armed with stolen files, draws dangerously close to Richard in her quest for the truth about her mother's death. Another factory worker falls ill with symptoms echoing a past fatality. Juma and Waridi are pregnant.
45	"Episode 45"	Various	Various	5 December 2025
It is a stormy night cast in a fiery confrontation between Bridget and Mark, where unspoken tensions spill out concerning untouched birthday gifts, cancelled plans, and buried grief over Amina and Joram. As their argument escalates, it becomes apparent who was involved in the chilling circumstances of both Amina's and Joram's deaths.
46	"Episode 46"	Various	Various	8 December 2025
Mark discovers a positive shift in Shaffie, hard at work but learns of Richard and Sophie's digitalization files and puts an end to it. Waridi's pregnancy news jolts Juma into emotional confusion before they embrace the change. Everything spirals when Natasha receives a call in the middle of cooking. There is a leaked scandalous video of her and another guy.
47	"Episode 47"	Various	Various	9 December 2025
Natasha's world crushes when a viral video exposes her to a scandalous scandal. With nobody by her side is she strong enough to recover from the blows and what is potentially the worst day of her life?
48	"Episode 48"	Various	Various	10 December 2025
In the aftermath of Natasha's explosive cheating scandal, the Mbotela family spirals into turmoil as personal betrayals clash with high-stakes power plays. Eugene threatening to upend fragile alliances to protect his daughter's name, Bridget scrambling to salvage Richard's future, and Mark destabilizing the sugar market with shady tactics, tensions reach a boiling point—forcing Richard to confront heartbreak under the weight of Mark's chilling words: "You're not ruined, you're being refined."
49	"Episode 49"	Various	Various	11 December 2025
The reality and weight of Natasha's cheating hits Richard hard and he goes berserk, letting his anger out on innocent people. Elsewhere, Natasha is inconsolable after being dumped by Richard over cheating. Sophie meets a lady who is about to help her answer her most troublesome questions over her late mother and family. Shaffie warms up to his new placement at Mamiit and begins to discover his real purpose.
50	"Episode 50"	Various	Various	12 December 2025
Sophie discovers and confirms that she has a brother, answering one of her biggest questions, but she needs more than that. Mark's severed relationship with Shaffie begins to be mended as he observes the boy drifting towards the right direction. Meanwhile Juma and Waridi's pregnancy journey continues to be dotted with love and affection.
51	"Episode 51"	Various	Various	15 December 2025
Sophie discovers her late mother's son is alive, she has a tense confrontation with Juma who confirms the truth, launching her into a desperate search for her brother. The Mbotela family fractures—Bridget pushes Richard toward a strategic reunion with Natasha, Mark's sugar war rattles their allies, Waridi battles stigma as an older pregnant woman, and Shaffie pitches bold digital strategies.
52	"Episode 52"	Various	Various	16 December 2025
Mark is impressed by Bridget's deep dive into seed canes, while she quietly pulls strings on Richard to toe her line. Shaffie is reinstated at the university, pursuing a different course. Meanwhile, Sophie's relentless mission to find baby Amina lands her closer to the past.
53	"Episode 53"	Various	Various	17 December 2025
As Mark escalates his focus to his political campaign, he entrusts Bridget with seed cane purchases. Sensing a growing closeness between Richard and Sophie, Bridget reassigns Sophie to field duties. Meanwhile, Mark sends Richard to Wendo Sugar Company to confront rising farmer poaching tensions.
54	"Episode 54"	Various	Various	18 December 2025
Richard's failed mission at Wendo Sugar causes a rift between him and his parents but he finds comfort in Sophie's embrace. Talia faces the blunt force of Bridget during campaign meetings, while Shaffie finds love in a hopeless place.
55	"Episode 55"	Various	Various	19 December 2025
The bond between Richard and Sophie tightens, but Bridget is determined to frustrate Richard out of this growing closeness. Meanwhile Shaffie and Riziki get closer as she begins to discover Shaffie's unique talent.
56	"Episode 56"	Various	Various	22 December 2025
Bridget's relationship with Richard is on the rocks over his refusal to take back Natasha as girlfriend and fiance. She humiliates Richard before senior company management, but Richard stays put. Mark, excited about a huge sugar delivery deal, is shocked and disappointed to learn about the impounding of his sugar consignment at the border on the eve of the delivery.
57	"Episode 57"	Various	Various	23 December 2025
The Mbotela empire is rocked by scandal when Mark's smuggled sugar trucks are seized, prompting a fiery outburst and threats against a border commissioner, while journalist Agostino unleashes a damning exposé tying Mark directly to the illegal operation. Bridget vows revenge, Richard and Sophie's chemistry intensifies, and Sophie uncovers a shocking truth about her long-lost brother Jowi Omondi.
58	"Episode 58"	Various	Various	24 December 2025
At the heat of the sugar smuggling scandal, Mark seeks vengeance against Agostino. Sophie is sent to the Mbotela's household and is given a looming threat by Bridget about her future at Mamiit company. Will she listen?
59	"Episode 59"	Various	Various	25 December 2025
Sophie celebrates an emotional breakthrough in finding out her brother's name is Jowi. Bridget clashes with Agostino over Mammit's politicization, leading to threats. Mark bonds with Shaffie over their project car and dinner. Factory tensions rise after a worker is involved in an accident after reporting to work drunk. Sophie and Richard share a moment of emotional reckoning amidst deepening bonds.
60	"Episode 60"	Various	Various	26 December 2025
Bridget witnesses an intimate moment between Richard and Sophie that makes her furious. Sophie's world shifts after uncovering that Shaffie is actually her long-lost brother called Jowi. Shaffie shrugs off teasing about his growing bond with Riziki, and Waridi finds encouragement in Juma's quiet support. Richard comes to work in the morning, only to find his name stripped from his door.
61	"Episode 61"	Various	Various	29 December 2025
Mark is stunned to learn that his longtime nemesis now heads rival Wendo Sugar Company. Bridget, bemused by news of a worker's accident, goes after the journalist covering it. Sophie confides to Wema that she has found her brother. Meanwhile, Richard is irked to learn the conditions of his return to work, as laid out by Bridget.
62	"Episode 62"	Various	Various	30 December 2025
Juma enforces safety measures at Mamiit Sugar Company to curb accidents. Talia pulls a clever move, salvaging both the company's and Mark's image. Meanwhile, Eugene and Bridget strategize on fast-tracking their M.O.U.
63	"Episode 63"	Various	Various	31 December 2025
The Mbotela Empire teeters on the edge as Mark heartlessly dismisses injured factory worker Jackson, sparking tensions with both Bridget and Talia over his ruthless political ambitions. As betrayals surface and family secrets threaten to erupt—spurred by Jackson's drunken confession to a journalist—the Mbotelas face a reckoning that could shatter everything they've built.
64	"Episode 64"	Various	Various	1 January 2026
Amos teams up with a new rival to bring Mamiit down as Talia and Bridget differ on political ideologies. Meanwhile Richard decides to level up and go job seeking to prove Bridget is wrong.
65	"Episode 65"	Various	Various	2 January 2026
Sophie deepens her connection with Shaffie under the guise of collaboration drawn by a quiet realization they might be siblings. Mark confronts Amos over his sabotage on Mamiit and their bitter history resurfaces. They trade veiled threats and Mark draws a gun on Amos. Mark encounters a blurry vision that hints at a deeper affliction. Bridget confesses to Richard that Mark isn't his biological father leaving Richard shattered.
66	"Episode 66"	Various	Various	5 January 2026
Sophie is summoned by Mark and interrogated on her mission at Mamiit. Richard's emotional confession reveals he isn't Mark's biological son, allowing Sophie to breathe easier amid tangled suspicions that he could be her brother. Bridget grows wary of Sophie's closeness with Shaffie and Waridi and Juma brace for a tense delivery with mounting fears. Amos and Agostino plot a devastating scheme to bring Mamiit Sugar to its knees, escalating the threat to Mark's crumbling.
67	"Episode 67"	Various	Various	6 January 2026
Tensions escalate as Mark vows to rescue Beth's son from the Gulf after learning about her stolen land, while Natasha's return to Mwima sparks emotional turmoil—confessing her love to a hesitant Richard. Shaffie and Richard clash over Natasha, and Bridget confronts Sophie about her intentions, family loyalties fray, further strained by Juma and Hawi's brewing conflict over Mamiit's sugarcane venture.
68	"Episode 68"	Various	Various	7 January 2026
Natasha begins to devise ways to get close with Richard as Mark comes up with a quick solution to deal with the lack of sugarcane. While this happens, his rival Agostino and Amos team up to initiate the perfect revenge plot.
69	"Episode 69"	Various	Various	8 January 2026
Natasha's efforts to get Richard's attention hits a brick wall and out of desperation, she decide to involve her online family.
70	"Episode 70"	Various	Various	9 January 2026
Panic rips through the Mbotelas over Richard's ingestion of contaminated sugar with Bridget and Mark getting at loggerheads over his condition.
71	"Episode 71"	Various	Various	12 January 2026
Richard tries to woo Sophie but she reminds him of Natasha only to later spot them holding hands during Mark's party launch.
72	"Episode 72"	Various	Various	13 January 2026
Richard seeks redemption for a date that once went wrong. Mark, in pursuit of revenge, travels Wendo to uncover a shocking alliance; Amos has joined forces with Agostino.
73	"Episode 73"	Various	Various	14 January 2026
Passion and power collide in a night of fire and impossible choices. Sophie pushes Richard away as Natasha's presence forces them to face reality.
74	"Episode 74"	Various	Various	15 January 2026
Sophie becomes a pillar to Richard, encouraging him as he finds huge clients for Mamiit sugar. The relationship between Juma and Mark is threatened.
75	"Episode 75"	Various	Various	16 January 2026
Richard has to maintain a delicate balance with Natasha, who accuses him of defending Sophie's alleged assault on her and Sophie, who thinks he is taking her for a ride.

== Production ==
=== Development ===
Lazizi was announced in early September 2025 ahead of its premiere later in October. The show is produced by Multan Production, the creators of telenovela, Selina.

Producer Reuben Odanga cited the inspiration for Lazizi grew out from his upbringing in Western Kenya. He said "I was inspired by the flora and fauna of this country, especially the beautiful landscapes of Muhoroni which I recall from my school days. I wanted to tell a story from that region, something we haven't done before. It felt right to give the people there a story that would be closer to home and very relatable."

MultiChoice Kenya hosted the show's launch part on 2 October at The Monaco with all cast and crew members attending. The event featured the premiere of Single Kiasi Season 4 which Helen Keli also stars in.

== Release ==
The show premiered on 6 October, and subsequent episodes air every Monday to Friday at 8 pm.

=== Awards and nominations ===
Year	Award	Category	Recipient(s)	Result	Ref.
2026	Kalasha International TV and Film Awards	Best Lead Actress in a TV Drama	Helen Keli	Nominated	
2026	Kalasha International TV and Film Awards	Best TV Director	June Ndinya, Vincent Mbaya and Davis Nato	Nominated	
2026	Zanzibar International Film Festival	Best TV Drama Series (East Africa)	Reuben Odanga	Nominated	
2026	Zanzibar International Film Festival	Best Actor in a TV Drama (East Africa)	Isaac Okoyo	Nominated	
2026	Zanzibar International Film Festival	Best Actress in a TV Drama (East Africa)	Vivian Nyawira	Nominated	
