= Subterranea (TV series) =

Kenyan TV series

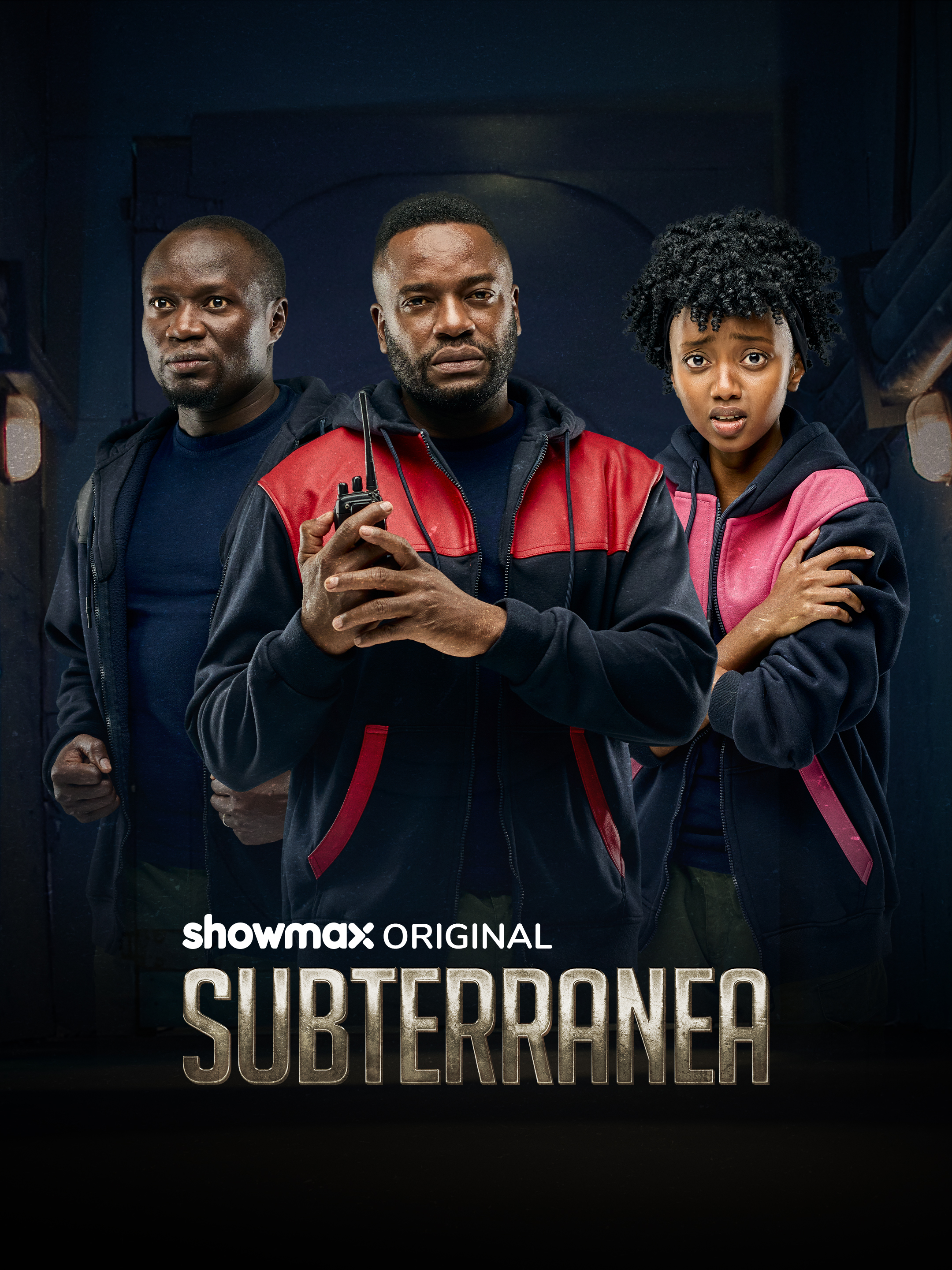
- Genre: Sci-Fi Psychological Drama
- Created by: Brian Munene
- Written by: Brian Munene; Likarion Wainaina; Martin Kigondu; Arnold Mwanjila
- Directed by: Likarion Wainaina
- Starring: Foi Wambui; Nice Githinji; Peter Kawa; Melvin Alusa; Biko Nyongesa; Pauline Komu; Dadson Gakenga; Makena Kahuha; Melissa Kiplagat; Bhavness Chudasama; Philipa Herman-Ndisi
- Country of origin: Kenya
- Original languages: English; Swahili
- No. of seasons: 1
- No. of episodes: 8

Production
- Producers: Brian Munene; Likarion Wainaina
- Running time: 40-60 minutes
- Production company: Kibanda Pictures

Original release
- Network: Showmax
- Release: 26 September – 14 November 2024

Subterranea (stylized in all-caps) is a 2024 Kenyan sci-fi psychological drama series created by Brian Munene and co-produced and directed by the award-winning filmmaker Likarion Wainaina under Kibanda Pictures. The show premiered on Showmax on September 26, 2024 and features an ensemble cast including Foi Wambui, Nice Githinji and Peter Kawa.

== Plot ==
Subterranea follows eight participants of a psychological experiment who are placed in an underground bunker to test the effects of close-quarter secluded relationships on humans.

== Cast ==
- Foi Wambui as Stella, code name Pink. She is hyper, eager and will do anything to make and keep friends. She discovers a possible way out of Subterranea but keeps it secret because she wants to keep her new found friends for a bit longer. She is also a survivor of a suicide cult from a young age that saw her entire family killing themselves.
- Nice Githinji as Leila Nguli, code name Grey. Leila works for Freya security and was handpicked by Anna to be the leader of the bunker. She accepts to be the mole in exchange of assurance that her younger brothers would get room in a bunker in case of another pandemic.
- Peter Kawa as David Wasa, code name Black. David is a medic dealing with PTSD after losing one of his children. He initially joins the experiment to make money for his family while using the project as a distraction from his postpartum depression.
- Melvin Alusa as Mark Turi, code name Red. He is an ex-navy officer running away from his demons. He has a fear of tight locked spaces which are a trigger for his PTSD. This makes him violent nearly killing two bunker members.
- Biko Nyongesa as Mwakesi Majale, code name Brown. He is a mechanic who was born and raised in Mathare slums. Despite his sharp mind, he had to drop out of school at fifteen due to lack of finances but used his wit and ingenuity to gain employment at a local garage, fixing everything from generators, water pumps and lorries. Unfortunately, his skills were so good that a local gang took notice. They tried to recruit him but he refused, they pushed on to the extent of burning his mother’s shop to get him to join them for a big score. Brown uses the experiment as a way of hiding from the gang.
- Pauline Komu as Viviane Ngao, code name Yellow. She is a primary school guidance counsellor dealing with a morphine addiction. She joins the experiment to deal with her addiction.
- Cindy Kahuha as Lucy Adema, code name Orange. Lucy was living in the shadow of her successful twin sister. When her sister gets selected for the experiment, Lucy steals her position for the money and to subconsciously prove that she too can do what her sister can. In the bunker, she has a fling with Brown.
- Bhavness Chudasama as Shamit Patel, code name Green. Prior to joining the experiment, he had tried to committed suicide following a bad break up with his ex. He joins the experiment to prove to his ex that he can be adventurous. He has a rare blood condition that allows his wounds heal quickly. He is a botanist and takes care of the plant station in the bunker.
- Dadson Gakenga as Arnold Ireri, a trained IT specialist and project assistant to Anna. Arnold’s career was saved by Anna who recognised his talents and took him under her wing. Dadson also serves as the voice behind AI assistant in the banker. His code name is Blue.
- Philipa Herman-Ndisi as Anna Nylander, head of the Subterranea project and an employee of Freya, a radical group of scientists who want to stop human kind from destroying earth. Her code name is Purple.
- Melissa Kiplagat as Erica, a fellow colleague at Freya. She is an antagonist to Anna.

== Episodes ==
Season	Episodes	Originally released	
Season	Episodes	First released	Last released
1	8	September 26, 2024	November 14, 2024

=== Season 1 (2024) ===
No.	Title	Directed by	Written by	Original release date
1	"Rapture"	Likarion Wainaina	Various	26 September 2024
The bunker team loses power, panics, and breaks protocol to restore it. Sick guards arrive via elevator, triggering an AI purge sequence. Trapped, they learn via radio that World War Three has started. They are Trapped.
2	"Genesis"	Likarion Wainaina	Various	3 October 2024
The team struggles to understand their situation, with Black determined to escape. The AI system reboots but doesn’t recognize them, requiring verbal reentry of their data, revealing hidden secrets.
3	"Pestilence"	Likarion Wainaina	Various	10 October 2024
Disease starts spreading, the bunker members start weighing their options of what to do Orange is hell bent on killing the infected so as not to infect the rest but black is reluctant One by one each member of the bunker gets sick with the exception of one.
4	"Famine"	Likarion Wainaina	Various	17 October 2024
A fire breaks out in the bunker's food store, diminishing their supplies. Amidst chaos, someone steals the remaining food, causing tensions to rise until Pink makes a surprising discovery, potentially resolving the situation.
5	"Pale Horse"	Likarion Wainaina	Various	24 October 2024
The power and life support systems to Subterranea mysteriously shut down. The bunker members try to restart systems at the bunker but nothing works. They slowly lose themselves to hallucinations caused by oxygen deprivation. Bunker members are haunted by their past. Unfortunately, one member dies before the team can restore basic bunker functions.
6	"Toharani"	Likarion Wainaina	Various	31 October 2024
The bunker members mourn the loss of one of their own and hold a ceremony to honour the departed. As they go through the motions, they discover an unauthorized device in the bunker that seems to be connected to the outside world.
7	"Revelations"	Likarion Wainaina	Various	7 November 2024
Chaos descends in the bunker, signs of a mole who has been communicating with the outside world surface and an all-out hunt erupts. Ass seems to be going south when the bunker member makes an unexplainable discovery.
8	"Memento Mori"	Likarion Wainaina	Various	14 November 2024
A purge sequence is initiated in the bunker. The bunker members, with the help of an unlikely source, fight tooth and nail to stop it, but they are cornered and under-equipped to combat the sequence. Four members die in the process.

== Production ==
=== Development ===
Series creator Brian Munene described that the concept of Subterranea "started as a space odyssey", inspired by Star Wars and Star Trek."

In an interview with OkayAfrica, show co-producer and director Likarion Wainaina added: “Sci-fi, at its core, is about how imagined and real science affects human behavior. It doesn’t have to be futuristic. We wanted to show that there’s more to sci-fi than the usual tropes.”

=== Casting ===
The cast was revealed in an announcement in early September 2024 which highlighted the ensemble cast.

== Release ==
The first episode of the show debuted on Showmax on 26 September 2024.

== Reception ==
=== Critical and audience response ===
The show received positive feedback. In his review, Business Daily Africa's Stanlaus Manthi described the show as an 'ambitious yet contained concept that is a step forward in Kenya's TV landscape.' Kelvin Kariuki from Sinema Focus added: "Rough Around the Edges, Kenya’s First Sci-Fi Series Breaks New Ground."

=== Awards and nominations ===
Year	Award	Category	Recipients	Result	Ref
2025	Africa Magic Viewers’ Choice Awards	Best Indigenous M-Net Original	Likarion Wainaina and Brian Munene	Nominated	
2025	Zanzibar International Film Festival	Best TV Drama Series in East Africa	Likarion Wainaina and Brian Munene	Won	
2026|	Kalasha International Film and TV Awards	People's Choice Award - TV Drama	Likarion Wainaina and Brian Munene	Nominated	
2026|	Kalasha International Film and TV Awards	Best Lead Actress - TV Drama	Foi Wambui	Nominated	
2026|	Kalasha International Film and TV Awards	Best Lead Actor - TV Drama	Melvin Alusa	Nominated	
2026|	Kalasha International Film and TV Awards	Best Supporting Actor - TV Drama	Biko Nyongesa	Nominated	
2026|	Kalasha International Film and TV Awards	Best Supporting Actress - TV Drama	Nice Githinji	Nominated	
2026|	Kalasha International Film and TV Awards	Best Director - TV Drama	Likarion Wainaina	Nominated	
2026|	Kalasha International Film and TV Awards	Best TV Scriptwriter	Likarion Wainaina, Brian Munene, Arnold Mwanjila and Martin Kigondu	Nominated	
