= TeraStorm =

Kenyan computer-animated science fiction

- Film poster
- Directed by: Andrew Kaggia
- Written by: Andrew Kaggia
- Produced by: Andrew Kaggia; Firul Maithya
- Starring: Ali Mwangola; Arabron Nyyneque; Melvin Alusa; Mungai Kiroga; Sara Muhoho; Peter Mudamba
- Animation by: Andrew Kaggia
- Production company: Afrikana Digital
- Release date: 24 November 2022
- Running time: 88 minutes
- Country: Kenya
- Languages: Swahili, English

TeraStorm is a 2022 Kenyan computer-animated science fiction film directed, written, and animated by Andrew Kaggia. The film was animated entirely using Unreal Engine. It was selected as the Kenyan entry for Best International Film at the 95th Academy Awards, making it the first African animated film to be selected to compete for this award. It is the first original African-scripted animated feature with African characters and context to be submitted for consideration for the Academy Award for Best International Feature at the Oscars.

== Synopsis ==
Set in a fictional Nairobi, a group of African superheroes join forces in an attempt to defeat an ancient wizard who threatens to destroy the earth with a powerful and mysterious artifact.

== Cast ==
- Ali Mwangola as Victor
- Arabron Nyyneque as Eli-Ra
- Melvin Alusa as Ammadu
- Mungai Kiroga as Adrian
- Sara Muhoho as Nuru
- Peter Mudamba as General Maxwell

== See also ==
- List of submissions to the 95th Academy Awards for Best International Feature Film
- List of Kenyan submissions for the Academy Award for Best International Feature Film
