= Foi Wambui =

Kenyan actress (born 1997)

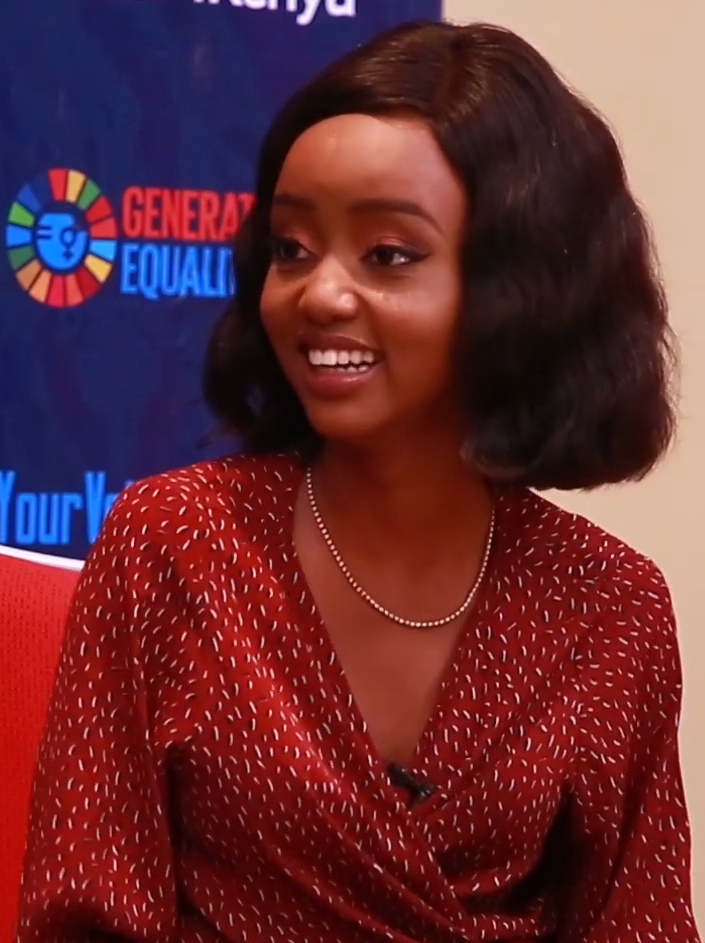
- Wambui in 2021
- Born: 16 July 1997 (age 29)
- Occupations: actress, media personality
- Spouse: Davis Githinji (m. 2026)

Foi Wambui (born 16 July 1997) is a Kenyan actress and media personality known for her active presence in film, television, and digital media. Her authentic storytelling and versatility have made her one of Kenya's most recognizable young talents, celebrated for roles in Crime and Justice, Sincerely Daisy, and Shanga.

== Personal life ==
=== Education ===
She first joined the University of Nairobi to study Law before dropping out to work as a radio presenter. Wambui attended United States International University (USUI) where she studied Bachelor of Arts in Broadcast Journalism and she graduated in 2024.

=== Marriage ===
In July 2026, she and her then fiancé, Davis Githinji, participated in a Ruracio ceremony (a traditional Kikuyu dowry negotiation and custom marriage ceremony). They got married a few weeks later on 1 September.

== Awards and nominations ==
| Year | Award | Category | Work | Result |
|---|---|---|---|---|
| 2020 | Kalasha Awards | Best Supporting Actress in a Film | Sincerely Daisy | Won |
| 2022 | Kalasha Awards | Best Supporting Actress in a TV Drama | Salem | Won |
| 2026 | Kalasha Awards | Best Lead Actress in a TV Drama | Subterranea | Nominated |
