= Big Girl Small World =

Kenyan TV series

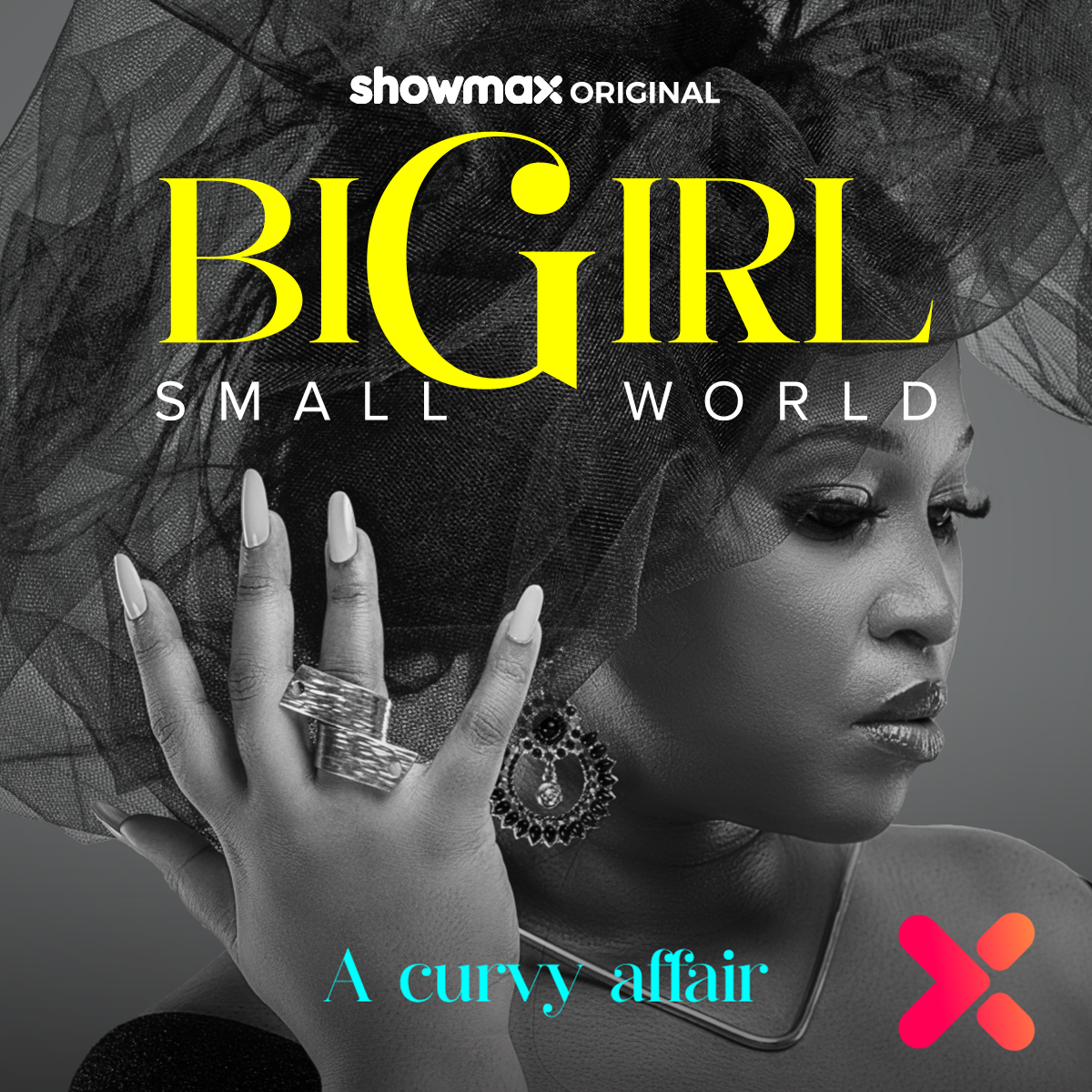
- Genre: Romantic comedy
- Written by: Angela Ruhinda
- Directed by: Nick Mutuma
- Starring: June Njenga; Daina Njuguna; Emmanuel Mugo; Fidel Maithya; Derek Bbanga; Kui Kabala
- Country of origin: Kenya
- Original languages: English; Swahili
- No. of seasons: 1
- No. of episodes: 13

Production
- Producer: Kevin Njue
- Running time: 25-35 minutes
- Production company: Giraffe Africa Productions

Original release
- Network: Showmax
- Release: 8 May – 31 July 2024

Big Girl Small World is a 2024 Kenyan rom-com series directed by Nick Mutuma and produced by Kevin Njue. It follows a plus-size woman who embarks on a journey of self-discovery after a humiliating scandal.

The show debuted on Showmax in May 2024 and stars June Njenga and Daina Njuguna.

== Plot ==
Ciku, a successful, plus-sized radio personality, stumbles through a journey of self-discovery after her sex tape, involving her long time boyfriend, is leaked .

In the process, she embarks on a journey of self-discovery, confronting the stereotypes and societal pressures that seek to shrink her existence.

== Cast ==
- June Njenga as Ciku, a successful plus-sized radio personality who faces challenges in her personal and professional life.
- Daina Njenga as Aisha, Ciku’s former best friend who is free-spirited and has a carefree outlook on life.
- Emmanuel Mugo as Cassim, Ciku's long-term boyfriend.
- Fidel Mathiya as Kwame, Ciku’s colleague and confidant. He is also a single dad who harbors feelings for Ciku.
- Derek Bbanga as Jomo, a charming man who is willing to offer Ciku everything she desires.
- Kui Kabala as Maureen, Ciku’s nemesis. She is a fast-rising and ambitious radio presenter.

== Series overview ==
Series	Episodes	Originally released	
Series	Episodes	First released	Last released
1	13	8 May 2024	31 July 2024

=== Season 1 (2024) ===
No.	Title	Directed by	Written by	Original release date
1	"Sex, Lies & Covers"	Nick Mutuma	Various	8 May 2024
2	"Rise & Fall"	Nick Mutuma	Various	15 May 2024
3	"Origin Story"	Nick Mutuma	Unknown	22 May 2024
4	"Hide & Seek"	Nick Mutuma	Various	29 May 2024
5	"Love & Light"	Nick Mutuma	Various	5 June 2024
6	"The Beatdown"	Nick Mutuma	Various	12 June 2024
7	"S.O.S"	Nick Mutuma	Various	19 June 2024
8	"Cock Blocker"	Nick Mutuma	Various	26 June 2024
9	"Running on Fumes"	Nick Mutuma	Various	3 July 2024
10	"Tea, Cookies & Triangles"	Nick Mutuma	Various	10 July 2024
11	"The Great Awakening"	Nick Mutuma	Various	17 July 2024
12	"Case of The Ex"	Nick Mutuma	Various	24 July 2024
13	"The Naked Truth"	Nick Mutuma	Various	31 July 2024

== Production ==
=== Development ===
Big Girl Small World was announced ahead of the Showmax Kenya relaunch in May 2024 alongside Untying Kantai, The Real Housewives of Nairobi Season 2 and Nilichoma.

The show features an all female writing team. Angela Ruhinda, known for her work on Binti serves as the headwriter an Joining her are Gathoni Kamau (Murder Camp), Wanjiru Kairu (The Agency), Safina Iqbal (“Disconnect”), and Kui Mwai.

== Release ==
Showmax released the first episode on 5 May, and subsequent episodes were available on the streaming platform every Wednesday until 31 July.

== Reception ==
=== Critical and audience response ===
Business Daily Africa's Stanlaus Manthi termed the Big Girl Small World as a ″humorous look at middle-class struggles in Nairobi″in his positive review.

=== Awards and nominations ===
Year	Award	Category	Recipient(s)	Result	Ref.
2024	Dakar Séries Festival	Best Short Series	Nick Mutuma and Kevin Njue	Won	
2024	Dakar Séries Festival	Best Editing	Allan Bosire	Won	
2024	Dakar Séries Festival	Best Lead Actress	June Njenga	Won	
2026	Kalasha Awards	Best TV Drama	Nick Mutuma and Kevin Njue	Nominated	
2026	Kalasha Awards	Best Lead Actress	June Njenga	Won	
2026	Kalasha Awards	Best Lead Actor	Emmanuel Mugo	Nominated	
2026	Kalasha Awards	Best Supporting Actress	Daina Njuguna	Nominated	
2026	Kalasha Awards	Best Supporting Actor	Dennis ‘OJ Mugo	Nominated	
2026	Kalasha Awards	Best TV Scriptwriter	Angela Ruhinda	Won	
2026	Kalasha Awards	People's Choice Award - TV Drama	Nick Mutuma	Nominated	
2026	Kalasha Awards	Best TV Director	Nick Mutuma	Nominated	
