= One Woman One Bra =

2025 comedy-drama film by Vincho Nchogu

- International promotional poster
- Directed by: Vincho Nchogu
- Written by: Vincho Nchogu
- Produced by: Josh Olaoluwa
- Starring: Sarah Karei; Norng'aruani Kipuker; Amos Leuka; Irungu Mutu; Boniface Saitabau; Davina Leonard
- Cinematography: Muhammad Atta Ahmed
- Edited by: Shannon C. Griffin
- Music by: Henrique Eisenmann
- Production companies: Kilastory; Conceptified Media
- Distributed by: Kilastory
- Release date: 27 August 2025 (Venice)
- Running time: 80 minutes
- Countries: Kenya; Nigeria
- Languages: Maasai; Swahili; English

One Woman One Bra is a 2025 comedy-drama film written and directed by Vincho Nchogu, in her feature directorial debut. A co-production of Kenya and Nigeria, it stars Sarah Karei as Star, a 38-year-old unmarried woman in a rural Kenyan village who faces losing her home when title deeds based on kinship ties are distributed.

The film had its world premiere in the Biennale College Cinema section of the 82nd Venice International Film Festival on 27 August 2025, and went on to win the Sutherland Award for Best First Feature at the BFI London Film Festival.

It was also selected as the Kenyan's entry for Best International Feature Film at the 99th Academy Awards.

== Synopsis ==
In the village of Sayit, Kenya, community members are about to receive title deeds to their land. However because the deeds are based on kinship ties, Star Karei, an unmarried woman whose parentage is unknown, may lose her home. She discovers a photograph of her younger self in "The World Book of Nomads" with a possible hint about her background. Desperate to maintain her claim to her land, Star tries various strategies which brings her into conflict with the village.

== Cast ==
- Sarah Karei as Star
- Norng'aruani Kipuker as Nane
- Davina Leonard as Jessica
- Amos Leuka as Chief
- Irungu Mutu as NGO Director
- Boniface Saitabau

== Production ==
One Woman One Bra was written and directed by Kenyan filmmaker Vincho Nchogu in her feature directorial debut. The film was produced by Nigerian filmmaker Joshua Olaoluwa through the Lagos-based Conceptified Media and the Kenyan-based Kilastory. It was developed through the Biennale College Cinema programme as one of four projects selected worldwide. Nchogu and Olaolua had previously been selected for the Red Sea Labs in 2023 and the Torino Film Lab, developing another feature project.

The film was shot entirely in Kenya with the cast and crew comprising 70% people from the village of Nkosesia in the Loita area. Actor Amos Leuka helped welcome the production in his village and gather women from a traveling community theatre to audition. The cinematography was conducted by Muhammad Atta Ahmed, whose credits include Beyoncé's Black is King.

The film draws on Nchogu's own experiences as an aspiring filmmaker in East Africa, where she worked for a nonprofit organization making what she now regards as "propaganda films" in which African subjects would often "suppress their personal narratives to conform to the organization's salvation myth". She cites the controversial 2012 documentary Kony 2012 as a turning point in her thinking about the power of owning one's narrative and the conception of "white saviorism" on the continent.

== Release ==
One Woman One Bra had its world premiere at the 82nd Venice International Film Festival on 27 August 2025, screening in the Biennial College Cinema section. It was the first Nigerian-produced to premiere at the Venice Film Festival. The film later had its North American premiere at the Tribeca Festival in 2026. It also screened at the BFI London Film Festival, where it won the Sutherland Trophy in the first feature competition. The film held its African premiere at the 47th Durban International Film Festival.

== Reception ==
The film has received positive reviews from critics. Screen International described the film as "brisk, energetic and to-the-point; a persuasive argument for reclaiming a cultural narrative from those who have no right to it". The BFI London Film Festival jury praised Nchogu's "ability to confidently move between so many tones, but always holding the audience with care," adding that her film makes use of humour for "shattering effect". Critics generally highlight the film's critique of Western NGOs and the "white saviour complex" while noting how the film addresses women's rights and autonomy.

=== Accolades ===
Year	Award	Category	Recipient(s)	Result	Ref.
2025	BFI London Film Festival	Sutherland Trophy (Best First Feature)	One Woman One Bra	Won	
2026	Tribeca Festival	Audience Award – Narrative First Place	One Woman One Bra	Won	

== See also ==
- List of submissions to the 99th Academy Awards for Best International Feature Film
- List of Kenyan submissions for the Academy Award for Best International Feature Film
