= The Chocolate Empire =

2025 Kenyan television series

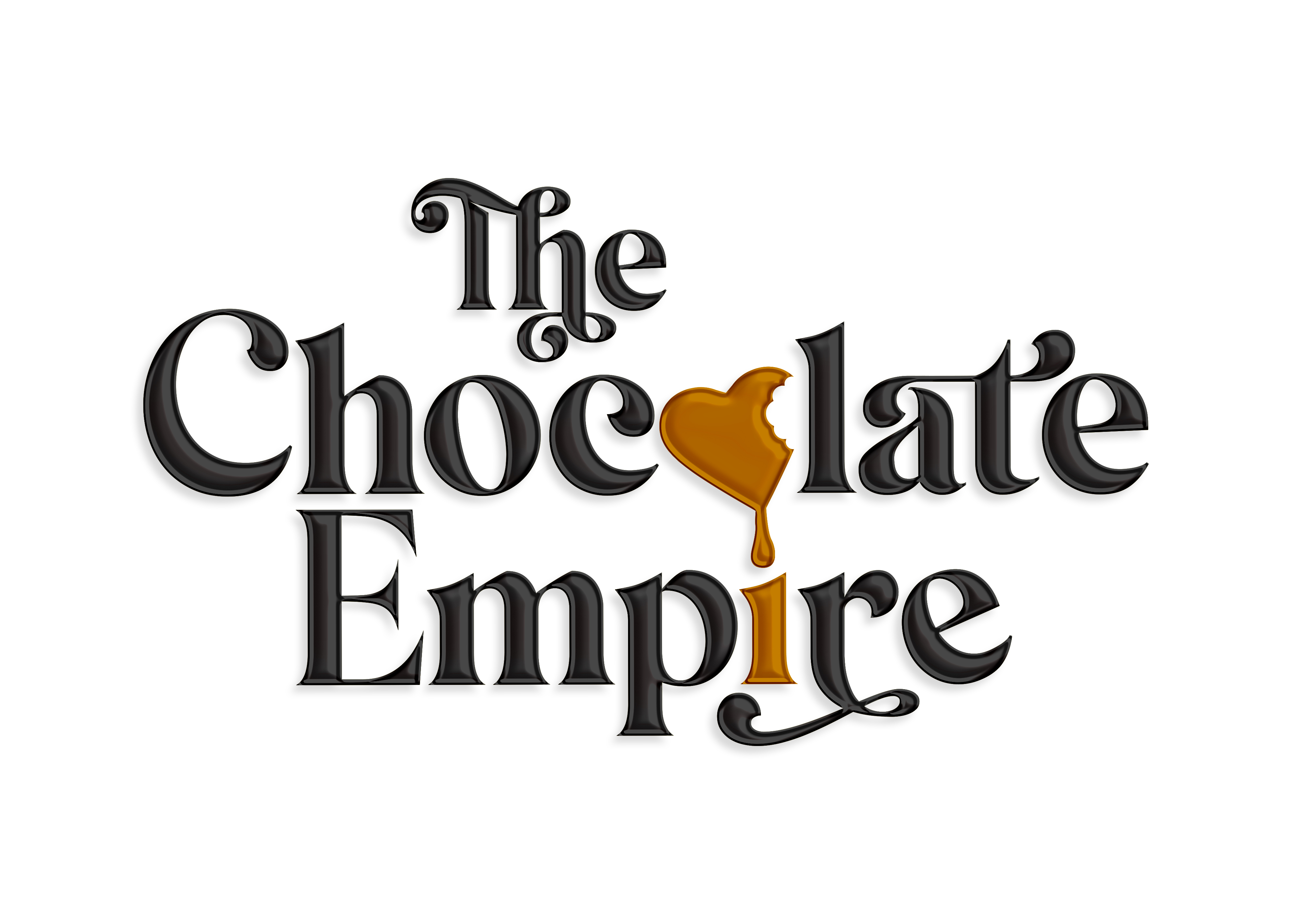
- Genre: Crime drama
- Written by: Philippe Bresson; Grace Kahaki
- Directed by: Philippe Bresson; Grace Kahaki
- Starring: Jimmy Gathu; Sanaipei Tande; Mumbi Maina; Ann Muli; Makena Kahuha; Aleks Kamau; Amalie Chopetta; Angie Magio; Mwaniki Mageria; Xtatic; Kael Njihia; Derek Bbanga
- Country of origin: Kenya
- Original languages: English; Swahili
- No. of seasons: 1
- No. of episodes: 10

Production
- Producers: Philippe Bresson; Grace Kahaki
- Running time: 37-50 minutes
- Production company: Insignia Productions

Original release
- Network: Showmax
- Release: 20 March – 22 May 2025

Related
- Rockville (TV series)

The Chocolate Empire is a 2025 Kenyan crime drama set in Nairobi, featuring an ensemble cast that includes Jimmy Gathu, Sanaipei Tande, and Mumbi Maina. The series is produced by Insignia Productions, the creators of Single Kiasi and Netflix original ''Kash Money''.

== Plot ==
The Chocolate Empire follows the life of JB Mauzo, a once-powerful businessman freshly released from prison. As JB works to rebuild his life and mend his fractured family, he secretly operates a high-end escort service from his exclusive cigar club in Nairobi. His clandestine empire and personal life collide when he meets Lily, a young woman from a struggling family, who takes a job at JB's club to help her mother make ends meet, unaware of the illegal operations taking place.

== Cast ==
- Jimmy Gathu as JB Mauzo, a former criminal and businessman
- Ann Muli as Lily, JB's love interest and Margaret's daughter
- Mumbi Maina as Vera, JB's diamond and high-end escort.
- Sanaipei Tande as Margaret, Lily's mother and a widow struggling to maintain her catering business. She is also a mother to Grace Nuru.
- Jackie Kaboi as Marie, JB's unfaithful wife and mother to his two kids.
- Kael Njihia as Kevin, JB's and Marie's rebellious son.
- Escay Gitonga as Sheila, JB's and Marie's caring daughter.
- Derek Bbanga as Mike, JB's longtime friend who gets romantically involved with Marie during JB's imprisonment.
- Amalie Chopetta as Mona, JB's longtime business partner and a former escort.
- Aleks Kamau as Clemo, an ex-con and JB's closest confidant.
- Linda Tyagi as Grace Nuru, Margaret's rebellious daughter and Lily's sister.
- Michael Saruni as Peter, Lily's religious boyfriend.
- Angie Magio as Subira, wife to Mr. Wambua. She is a city council official.
- Cindy Kahuha as Ebony, an escort at JB's club.
- Xtatic as Jade, an escort at JB's club.
- Ivy Wanjiku as Caramel, an escort at JB's club.
- Mwaniki Mageria as Pastor Maurice, a respected church leader in his community who also harbors feelings for Margaret.
- Kennedy Musumba as Mr. Wambua, a wealthy elderly man and husband to Subira. He is having an affair with Grace Nuru.

== Episode ==
Season	Episodes	Originally released	
Season	Episodes	First released	Last released
1	10	March 20, 2025	May 22, 2025

=== Season 1 (2025) ===
No.	Title	Directed by	Written by	Original release date
1	"Episode 1"	Unknown	Unknown	20 March 2025
JB's seemingly perfect world is shattered by an unexpected threat, as Margaret and her daughters fight to survive after losing everything.
2	"Episode 2"	Unknown	Unknown	27 March 2025
Lily uncovers a secret that threatens to destroy her family while JB works to keep his family in the dark about his business
3	"Episode 3"	Unknown	Unknown	3 April 2025
An unexpected event threatens to destroy JB’s world, as Lily struggles with her growing feelings for JB. Margaret runs into obstacles while trying to solve her money problem.
4	"Episode 4"	Unknown	Unknown	10 April 2025
JB reels Margaret in, as Lily discovers the true nature of JB's business. Lily's relationship crumbles as Vera fights her raging guilt.
5	"Episode 5"	Unknown	Unknown	17 April 2025
JB and Mike face off as he digs into the minister's death. A close ally betrays JB. Lily and Peter's relationship comes to a head with an unexpected surprise.
6	"Episode 6"	Unknown	Unknown	24 April 2025
Sheila's disappearance throws the family into a storm, while Margaret and Subira launch a secret operation. Lily faces Peter's wrath.
7	"Episode 7"	Unknown	Unknown	1 May 2025
Cracks begin to appear in JB's marriage as Marie grows increasingly suspicious. Pastor Maurice is ready to declare his love for Margaret. Lily makes a bold choice.
8	"Episode 8"	Unknown	Unknown	8 May 2025
JB's sacrifice unravels a secret that threatens to destroy his marriage. Margaret and Pastor's relationship grows stronger, while Lily grapples with the consequences of her choices.
9	"Episode 9"	Unknown	Unknown	15 May 2025
As secrets unravel in the Mauzo house, JB and Marie are faced with a difficult choice. Meanwhile, Mike closes in on JB, revealing his biggest weakness. Margaret makes a startling discovery.
10	"Episode 10"	Unknown	Unknown	22 May 2025
JB and Mike have a showdown that threatens the lives of those around them. Margaret's world is turned upside down as her family is torn apart.

== Production ==
=== Development ===
Show producer Grace Kahaki said the show is a local adaptation of the South African television series Rockville with an authentic Nairobi vibe.

=== Casting ===
The cast was announced at the start of season 1 and included Jimmy Gathu, Sanaipei Tande, Mumbi Maina, among others.

== Release ==
Showmax released the first episode of The Chocolate Empire on 20 March with subsequent episodes released every Thursday.

== Critical reception ==
Business Daily Africa's Sophie Nzisagave the series a positive review describing it as " a dramatically raunchy look at the dark side of Nairobi" adding that "Chocolate Empire strikes a nice balance between glamour and realism. It's raunchy and provocative, but it doesn't forget its themes".

=== Awards and nominations ===
Year	Award	Category	Recipient(s)	Result	Ref.
2025	Zanzibar International Film Festival	Best TV Drama Series in East Africa	Phillipe Bresson & Grace Kahaki	Nominated	
2025	Zanzibar International Film Festival	Best Actor in a Drama Series in East Africa	Jimmy Gathu	Won	
2026	Kalasha International Film and TV Awards	People's Choice Award - TV Drama	Phillipe Bresson & Grace Kahaki	Nominated	
2026	Kalasha International Film and TV Awards	Best Lead Actor - TV Drama	Jimmy Gathu	Nominated	
2026	Kalasha International Film and TV Awards	Best TV Director	Phillipe Bresson & Grace Kahaki	Nominated	
2026	Africa Magic Viewers’ Choice Awards	Best Scripted Series	Phillipe Bresson & Grace Kahaki	Nominated	
2026	Africa Magic Viewers’ Choice Awards	Best Indigenous M-Net Original	Phillipe Bresson & Grace Kahaki	Nominated	
