= Nawi (film) =

Kenya-German feature film

NAWI - Dear Future Me
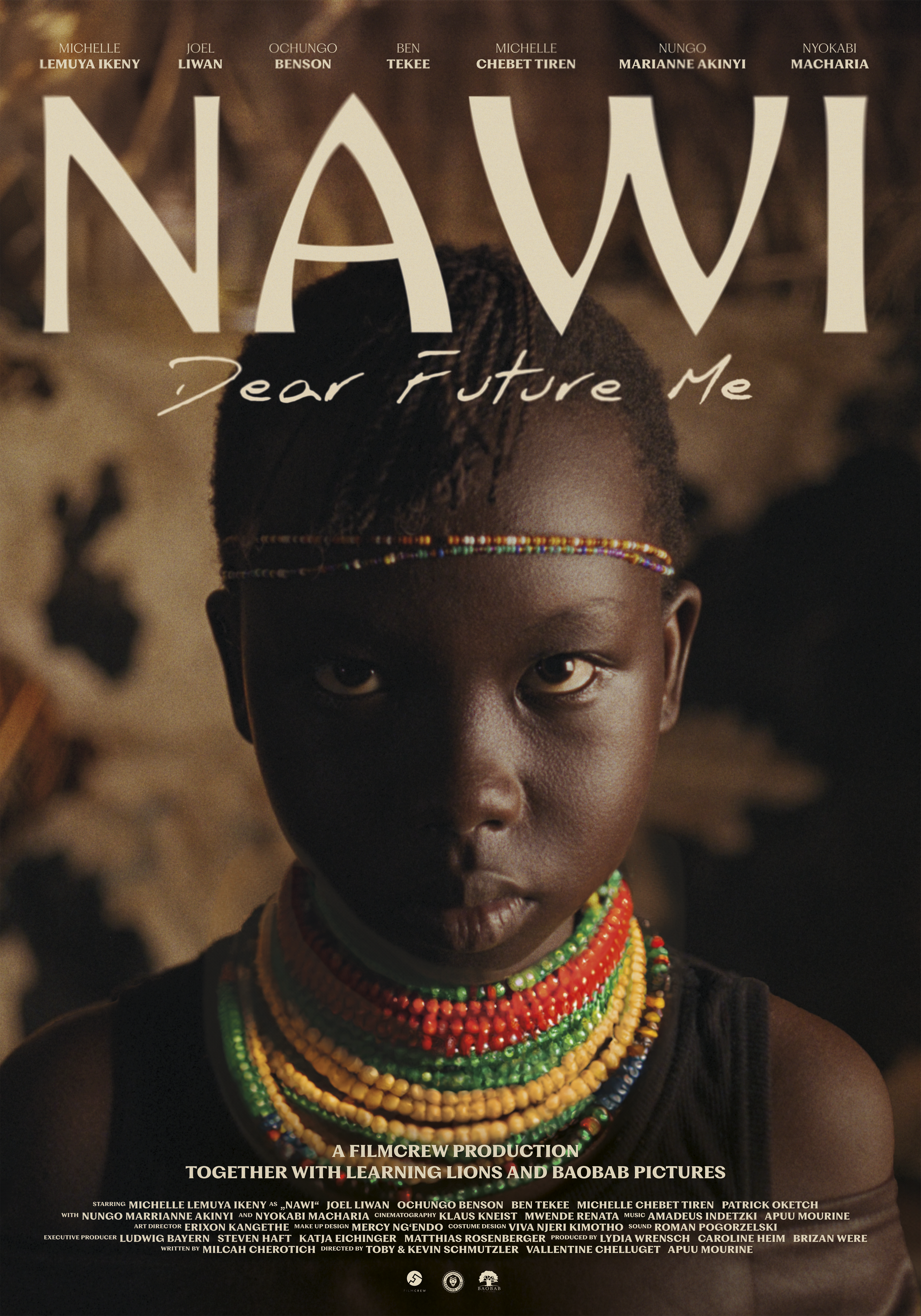
- Theatrical release poster
- Directed by: Toby Schmutzler; Kevin Schmutzler; Apuu Mourine; Vallentine Chelluget
- Written by: Milcah Cherotich
- Produced by: Lydia Wrensch; Caroline Heim; Brizan Were; Ludwig Bayern (EP); Steven Haft (EP); Katja Eichinger (EP); Matthias Rosenberger (EP)
- Starring: Michelle Lemuya; Joel Liwan; Ochungo Benson; Ben Tekee; Michelle Chebet Tiren; Patrick Oketch; Nungo Marrianne Akinyi; Nyokabi Macharia
- Cinematography: Klaus Kneist; Mwende Renata
- Music by: Amadeus Indetzki; Apuu Mourine
- Release date: August 2024
- Running time: 99 minutes
- Country: Kenya
- Languages: Swahili; English

NAWI: Dear Future Me (marketed as Nawi: Dear Future Me) is a 2024 Kenyan-German coming-of-age drama directed by the brothers Toby and Kevin Schmutzler, Apuu Mourine, and Vallentine Chelluget and written by Milcah Cherotich. Set in the remote Turkana region of Kenya, the film follows a young girl's struggle against a forced marriage and her pursuit of education and self-determination.

NAWI was selected as the Kenyan's entry for Best International Feature Film at the 97th Academy Awards. NAWI has screened on over 50 international film festivals worldwide and has won 25 awards, including Best Promising Actor for the film's lead actress, Michelle Lemuya Ikeny at the African Movie Academy Award, Best International Film at Raindance and the German Peace Prize "Die Brücke".

== Synopsis ==
NAWI is set in the arid, isolated landscapes of Turkana, Kenya, focusing on the life of a young girl named Nawi. The film, based on true events, follows Nawi, a 13-year-old girl who is sold into marriage for livestock. Desperate to escape her fate, Nawi flees on her wedding night to pursue her dream of attending high school. Along her journey, she faces challenges from her family and community bound by traditional customs. Nawi takes a bold stand for her own life and those of other young girls at risk, embodying themes of resistance, hope, and transformation. The film emphasizes the need of access to education especially for girls in remote regions of Africa in order to fight the practice of forced child marriages.

== Cast ==
- Michelle Lemuya Ikeny as Nawi
- Joel Liwan as Joel
- Ochungo Benson as Eree
- Ben Tekee as Shadrack
- Michelle Chebet Tiren as Rosemary
- Patrick Oketch as Emanikor
- Nungo Marrianne Akinyi as Mama Ekai
- Nyokabi Macharia as Madame Christine
- Sienna Tanayian as Hope

== Background and development ==
NAWI is a collaboration between the production companies FilmCrew Media GmbH and Baobab Pictures and the Turkana-based NGO Learning Lions, which focuses on educational opportunities and social empowerment for young people in Turkana, Kenya. The story for the script was found through a national writing contest in Kenya, where Milcah Cherotich, a first-time writer, shared a compelling story about a young girl facing forced marriage. This story became the foundation of the film, resonating with both local and international concerns regarding child marriage and gender equality.

NAWI was filmed in the remote landscapes of Turkana, with a team that included international and Kenyan crew members. It was directed by four directors,Toby and Kevin Schmutzler, Apuu Mourine and Vallentine Chelluget. The production itself became a learning experience for many in the region, reflecting the film's mission of empowerment through education and cross-cultural collaboration. To support the cause beyond the film, the NAWI Initiative was created, with a portion of the film's proceeds dedicated to initiatives that help girls escape forced marriage through education and support programs.

== Awards ==
Michelle Lemuya won the 2024 African Movie Academy Award (AMAA) for Best Promising Actor for her role as Nawi. The film was also nominated in four other categories including Best Supporting Actor, Best Cinematography, Best Editing and Best Make Up. The film had its German festival premiere at the Hof International Film Festival and its Kenyan festival premiere at the Nairobi Film Fest. It's extensive festival run continued on prestigious events like Raindance, Beijing International Film Festival (BJIFF) and Pan African Film & Arts Festival (PAFF).

In addition to screenings in the festival circuit, NAWI screened at high level NGO and political events like UN General Assembly 80 and UN CSW in cooperation with Girls Not Brides.

Securing an long cinema run of seven weeks within Kenya, NAWI was acclaimed for its storytelling, acting and cinematography.

At the 2026 Kalasha Awards it walked away with 5 awards namely: the Best Feature Film; Michelle Lemuya for Best Lead Actress In A Film; Viva Njeri for Best Costume Designer; Erikson Kang’ethe for Best Production Designer and the People’s Choice Award – Feature Film.

List of awards won:

Festival / Award	Country	Section / Category	Award(s) for Nawi: Dear Future Me	Ref.
African Movie Academy Awards (AMAA)	Nigeria	Acting	Best Young/Promising Actor – Michelle Lemuya Ikeny	
Raindance Film Festival	United Kingdom	Feature competition	Best Feature Film; Best Debut Performance (Michelle Lemuya Ikeny)	
Beijing International Film Festival – Tiantan Awards	China	Main international competition	Special Jury Award	
Pan African Film & Arts Festival (PAFF)	United States	Narrative feature competition	Best Feature Film	
German Film Award for Peace – "Die Brücke"	Germany	Peace & human rights cinema	Special Prize / German Film Award for Peace for Nawi	
Zlín Film Festival – International Film Festival for Children and Youth	Czech Republic	Youth / junior competition	Youth Jury Award for Best Feature Film (Teens & Youth section)	
Fribourg International Film Festival (FIFF)	Switzerland	International competition	Audience Award	
Kitale Film Week	Kenya	Craft / cinematography	Best Cinematography	
International Film Festival Gorinchem (IFFG)	Netherlands	International competition	Audience Award	
Stockholm International Film Festival Junior	Sweden	Youth competition (11–19)	Bronze Horse – Best Film (11–19 years)	
Eurasia Kinofest – International Film Festival of Eurasian Countries	Russia	Main competition	Best Film	
tve Global Sustainability Film Awards (GSFA)	United Kingdom	Founder's Award – feature films	Founder's Award (Feature category) – Sustainability on the Big Screen	
Spirit of Fire International Festival of Cinematographic Debuts	Russia	International competition (youth / debut)	Best Feature Film (International competition; Golden/Bronze Taiga)	
Internationales Filmwochenende Würzburg	Germany	International programme	Audience Award	
Novi Sad Film Festival	Serbia	Main competition	Best Film	
Stony Brook Film Festival	United States	Festival awards	Audience Award for Best Feature	
DaVinci International Film Festival	United States	Feature competition	Leo Award – Best Feature Film (International)	
Pigeon International Film Festival	Iceland	International competition	Best Film; Best Cinematography; Best Acting	
Kineko International Children’s Film Festival	Japan	Teens feature competition	Best Teen Film / Grand Prize – Teen Feature section	
Ateker International Film Festival	Kenya	Main competition	Best Film	
Africa International Film Festival (AFRIFF)	Nigeria	Performance awards	Best Female Performance – Michelle Lemuya Ikeny	
Cinemafricano / Festival del Cinema Africano (Educational section)	Italy	Educational / youth jury	Best Educational Film (Educational section prize)	
013 International Film Festival (Cinecitta Tilburg)	Netherlands	International competition	Audience Award	
Hollywood and African Prestigious Awards (HAPAwards)	United States	Film awards – Africa section	Best Independent Film (Africa)	
Film by the Sea International Film Festival	Netherlands	Youth & audience awards	Youth Jury Award; Audience Award	
Kalasha Awards	Kenya	Film category	Best Feature Film	
Kalasha Awards	Kenya	Best Lead Actress In A Film	Michelle Lemuya	
Kalasha Awards	Kenya	Best Costume Designer	Viva Njeri	
Kalasha Awards	Kenya	Best Production Designer	Erikson Kang’ethe	
Kalasha Awards	Kenya	Film category	People’s Choice Award – Feature Film	

== See also ==
- List of submissions to the 97th Academy Awards for Best International Feature Film
- List of Kenyan submissions for the Academy Award for Best International Feature Film
