= Supa Modo =

- Film poster
- Directed by: Likarion Wainaina
- Written by: Silas Miami; Mugambi Nthiga; Wanjeri Gakuru; Kamau Wa Ndung'u; Likarion Wainaina
- Story by: Likarion Wainaina
- Produced by: Sarika Hemi Lakhani; Marie Steinmann-Tykwer; Tom Tykwer; Ginger Wilson; Guy Wilson
- Starring: Stycie Waweru; Maryanne Nungo; Nyawara Ndambia
- Cinematography: Enos Olik; Volker Tittel
- Edited by: Christian Krämer; Charity Kuria
- Music by: Sean Peevers
- Production companies: Festival Agency; Neaniko Plano; Rushlake Media
- Distributed by: Juno Films rigon-film Sächsischer Kinder- und Jugendfilmdienst; Stowarzyszenie Nowe Horyzonty; Neaniko Plano; The Criterion Channel; El Sur Films; Filmcentrum Distribution
- Release date: February 2018 (Berlin)
- Running time: 74 minutes
- Countries: Kenya; Germany
- Languages: Swahili; Kikuyu; English
- Budget: €250,000

Supa Modo is a 2018 internationally co-produced drama film directed by Likarion Wainaina. It first premiered at 68th Berlin International Film Festival. It was selected as the Kenyan entry for the Best Foreign Language Film at the 91st Academy Awards, but it was not nominated.

== Plot ==
Jo is a young girl living in a small village in Kenya. It is her dream to become a super-hero, but unfortunately these ambitions are hindered by her impending terminal illness. The whole village is plotting a genius plan with the goal to make her wish come true.

== Background ==
Supa Modo was produced as part of the One Fine Day Films workshop-project, which gives African filmmakers the opportunity to learn from mentors and create their stories for an international audience. The project was founded by Tom Tykwer and Marie Steinmann. Other movies resulting from this workshop include Kati Kati, Nairobi Half Life, Something Necessary and Soul Boy.

== Cast ==
- Stycie Waweru as Jo
- Akinyi Marianne as Kathryn
- Nyawara Ndambia as Mwix
- Johnson Gitau Chege as Mike
- Humphrey Maina as Pato
- Joseph Omari as Chairman
- Rita Njenga as Nyanya
- Dinah Githinji as Anne
- Nellex Nderitu as Titus
- Edna Daisy Nguka as Josephine
- Peris Wambui as Caro
- Mercy Kariuki as Soni
- Cindy Kahuha as Halima
- Nick Mwathi as Villager 1
- Muriithi Mwangi as Villager 2
- Martin Nyakabete as Villager 3
- Joseph Wairimu as Rico
- Isaya Evans as Hospital Orderly
- Manuel Sierbert as Doctor
- Michael Bahati as Njuguna
- Meshack Omondi as Brayo
- Elsie Wairimy as Charlo
- John Gathinya as Ozil
- Francis Githinji as Toni
- Jubilant Elijah as Kush
- Euphine Akoth Odhiambo as Football player
- Mary Njeri Mwangi as Football player
- Benedict Musau as Football player
- Yu Long Hu as Kung fu fighter
- Biqun Su as Kung fu fighter
- Likarion Wainaina as Thief in a motorcycle

== Release ==
The movie had its world premiere at the 68th Berlin International Film Festival in the category "Generations".

== Awards and nominations ==
Year	Ceremony	Category	Nominee	Result	Ref.
2018	Berlin International Film Festival	Generation Kplus - Best Film	Supa Modo	Nominated	
2018	Berlin International Film Festival	Generation Kplus - Best Feature Film	Supa Modo	Won	
2018	Edinburgh International Film Festival	Best International Feature Film	Supa Modo	Nominated	
2018	Edinburgh International Film Festival	Best International Feature Film - Special Mention	Supa Modo	Won	
2018	Carrousel International du Film	Best Feature	Supa Modo	Won	
2018	Emden International Film Festival	Best Film - SCORE Bernhard Wicki Award	Supa Modo	Won	
2018	Emden International Film Festival	AOK Film Award	Supa Modo	Won	
2018	Hamburg Film Festival	Micheal Award	Supa Modo	Won	
2018	Molodist Kyiv International Film Festival	Teen Screen Competition - Special Jury Diploma	Supa Modo	Won	
2018	Molodist Kyiv International Film Festival	Teen Screen Competition - Scythian Deer	Supa Modo	Nominated	
2019	Palm Springs International Film Festival	Best Foreign Language Film	Supa Modo	Nominated	
2019	Portland International Film Festival	Best of Films for Families	Supa Modo	Won	
2018	Seattle International Film Festival	New Directors Competition	Likarion Wainaina	Nominated	
2018	Seattle International Film Festival	Best Film - Golden Space Needle Award	Supa Modo	Nominated	
2018	Seattle International Film Festival	Best Film - Films4Families Youth Jury Award	Supa Modo	Nominated	
2018	Zlín International Film Festival for Children and Youth	Best feature Film for Children	Supa Modo	Won	
2018	Zlín International Film Festival for Children and Youth	Ecumenical Jury Award	Supa Modo	Won	
2018	Cinekid	Youth Jury Award	Supa Modo	Won	
2018	Ale Kino! - International Young Audience Film Festival	Young People's Jury Award	Supa Modo	Won	
2018	Ale Kino! - International Young Audience Film Festival	Arthouse Cinemas Network Award	Supa Modo	Won	
2018	Zanzibar International Film Festival	Best Feature Film	Supa Modo	Won	
2018	Zanzibar International Film Festival	Best Film from East Africa	Supa Modo	Won	
2018	Carthage Film Festival	Narrative Feature Film	Supa Modo	Nominated	
2018	Carthage Film Festival	Best Screenplay	Supa Modo	Won	
2018	Kristiansand International Children's Film Festival	EFCA Award	Likarion Wainaina	Won	
2018	Durban International Film Festival	Artistic Bravery Prize	Supa Modo	Won	
2018	Durban International Film Festival	Best Film - International Competition	Supa Modo	Nominated	
2018	Minneapolis St. Paul international Film Festival	Youth Jury Award	Supa Modo	Won	
2018	Black Film Festival Montreal	Best Narrative Feature	Supa Modo	Won	
2018	Minsk International Film Festival “Listapad”	Best Film	Supa Modo	Won	
2018	Minsk International Film Festival “Listapad”	Best Film for Children and Youth	Supa Modo	Won	
2018	Africa Magic Viewers Choice Awards	Best indigenous language Movie/Tv series in Swahili	Supa Modo	Won	
2018	Olympia International Film Festival for Children and Young People	Best Feature Film	Supa Modo	Won	
2018	Olympia International Film Festival for Children and Young People	Best Feature Film Screenplay	Mugambi Nthiga	Won	
2018	Olympia International Film Festival for Children and Young People	Hellenic Parliament Award	Supa Modo	Won	
2019	Olympia International Film Festival for Children and Young People	ECFA Award	Supa Modo	Won	
2019	Cinema Public Festival Cine Junior	Young Jury's Prize	Supa Modo	Won	
2019	Cinema Public Festival Cine Junior	Grain à Démoudre Award	Supa Modo	Won	
2019	Cinema Public Festival Cine Junior	CICAE Award	Supa Modo	Won	
2018	Jozi Film Festival	Audience Choice Award	Supa Modo	Won	
2018	Cinetopia Film Festival	Foreign Narrative - Audience Award	Supa Modo	Won	
2018	International Film Festival for Children and Young Audience SCHLiNGEL	Best National Feature Film - DEFA Foundation Award	Supa Modo	Won	
2018	International Film Festival for Children and Young Audience SCHLiNGEL	Best national feature Film - Children's and Youth Film Award of the Goethe-Instut	Supa Modo	Won	
2018	Dytiatko International Children TV Festival	Best Director	Likarion Wainaina	Won	
2018	Cape Town International Film Market and Festival	Best New Director	Likarion Wainaina	Won	
2018	Kalasha International Film and TV Awards	Best Production Designer	Neha Manoj Shah	Won	
2018	Kalasha International Film and TV Awards	Best Lead Actor Film	Johnson Gitau Chege	Won	
2018	Kalasha International Film and TV Awards	Best Supporting Actress Film	Marrianne Nungo	Won	
2018	Kalasha International Film and TV Awards	Best Screenplay	Mugambi Nthiga	Won	
2018	Kalasha International Film and TV Awards	Best Picture	Ginger Wilson	Nominated	
2018	Kalasha International Film and TV Awards	Best Director	Likarion Wainaina	Nominated	
2018	Kalasha International Film and TV Awards	Best Lead Actress Film	Stycie Waweru	Nominated	
2018	Kalasha International Film and TV Awards	Best Cinematography	Enos Olik	Nominated	
2018	Kalasha International Film and TV Awards	Best Local Language Film	Ginger Wilson	Nominated	
2018	Kino W Trampkach (Cinema in Sneakers Film Festival for Children and Youth)	Best Children's Film - Special Mention Jury	Supa Modo	Won	
2019	Children's Film Festival Seattle	Audience Award	Supa Modo	Won	
2019	Children's Film Festival Seattle	Fantastic Foxes Jury Prize	Supa Modo	Won	
2019	Children's Film Festival Seattle	Iron Giants Jury Prize	Supa Modo	Won	

== See also ==
- List of Afrofuturist films
- List of submissions to the 91st Academy Awards for Best Foreign Language Film
- List of Kenyan submissions for the Academy Award for Best Foreign Language Film
