= List of Kenyan submissions for the Academy Award for Best International Feature Film =

List of Kenyan films

Best International Feature Film submissions from Kenya

Highlights
- Debut: 2012
- Submissions: 10
- Nominations: none
- Oscar winners: none

Kenya submitted a film for the Academy Award for Best International Feature Film (Note: The category was previously named the Academy Award for Best Foreign Language Film, but this was changed to the Academy Award for Best International Feature Film in April 2019, after the Academy deemed the word "Foreign" to be outdated.) for the first time in 2012. The award is handed out annually by the United States Academy of Motion Picture Arts and Sciences to a feature-length motion picture produced outside the United States that contains primarily non-English dialogue. It was not created until the 1956 Academy Awards, in which a competitive Academy Award of Merit, known as the Best Foreign Language Film Award, was created for non-English speaking films, and has been given annually since.

As of 2026, Kenya has submitted ten films, but none of them were nominated.

== Submissions ==
The Academy of Motion Picture Arts and Sciences has invited the film industries of various countries to submit their best film for the Academy Award for Best International Feature Film since 1956. The International Feature Film Committee oversees the process and reviews all the submitted films. Following this, they vote via secret ballot to determine the five nominees for the award.

All the films submitted were primary in Swahili. Below is a list of the films that have been submitted by Kenya for review by the Academy for the award by year and the respective Academy Awards ceremony.

Year (Ceremony)	Film title used in nomination	Original title	Language(s)	Director	Result
2012 (85th)	Nairobi Half Life		Swahili	David Tosh Gitonga	Not nominated
2017 (90th)	Kati Kati		Swahili, English	Mbithi Masya	Not nominated
2018 (91st)	Supa Modo		Swahili	Likarion Wainaina	Not nominated
2019 (92nd)	Subira		Swahili	Ravneet Sippy Chadha	Not nominated
2020 (93rd)	The Letter	Barua	Swahili	Maia Lekow, Chris King	Not nominated
2021 (94th)	Mission to Rescue		Swahili	Gilbert Lukalia	Not nominated
2022 (95th)	TeraStorm		Swahili, English	Andrew Kaggia	Not nominated
2023 (96th)	Mvera		Swahili	Daudi Anguka	Not nominated
2024 (97th)	Nawi		Swahili, English	Vallentine Chelluget, Apuu Mourine, Kevin Schmutzler and Toby Schmutzler	Not nominated
2026 (99th)	One Woman One Bra		Maasai, Swahili, English	Vincho Nchogu	Pending

== See also ==
- List of Academy Award winners and nominees for Best International Feature Film
- List of Academy Award-winning foreign language films
