= Memory of Princess Mumbi =

2025 Kenyan film by Damien Hauser

- Directed by: Damien Hauser
- Written by: Damien Hauser
- Produced by: Damien Hauser; Kaleem Aftab; Shandra Apondi
- Starring: Ibrahim Joseph; Shandra Apondi; Samson Waithaka; Michael Garama; Damien Hauser
- Cinematography: Damien Hauser
- Edited by: Damien Hauser
- Music by: Damien Hauser
- Production companies: Out of My Mind Films; Hauserfilm; Red Sea Film Fund
- Distributed by: Paradise City (film sales)
- Release date: 1 September 2025 (Venice)
- Running time: 80 minutes
- Countries: Kenya; Switzerland
- Language: English

Memory of Princess Mumbi is a 2025 Kenyan-Swiss science-fiction mockumentary film by Damien Hauser. It was Hauser's fourth feature film, which he made as a means of coping with his brother's death. The film premiered at the Venice Film Festival on 1 September 2025.

== Synopsis ==
In 2093, European documentary filmmaker Kuve visits the African coastal realm of Umata for a project covering the effects of a major war that occurred in the 2070s. Neighboring regions, seeking to ban depression among their populations, have banned computer technology and reinstated traditional kingdoms as a form of governance.

Mumbi, one of the locals Kuve recruits for his documentary, challenges him and his crew to make a film free of artificial intelligence. Kuve falls in love with Mumbi, but she is betrothed to Prince, ruler of a neighbouring kingdom. Six years later, Mumbi—now a princess—reunites with Kuve, and unresolved romantic tensions lead to tragedy during production of his new blockbuster.

== Cast ==
- Ibrahim Joseph as Kuve
- Damien Hauser as himself (Kuve's assistant)
- Shandra Apondi as Princess Mumbi
- Samson Waithaka as Prince Prince
- Michael Garama

== Development ==
After his teenage brother died in a motorcycle crash, "Hauser decided to create something at the intersection of loss and memory — a collage of 'beautiful moments' that could elide the tragedy at its heart while helping him process his own grief." The film's end credits carry a dedication to the brother.

The film's futuristic setting emerged during Hauser's experimentation with AI-generated imagery. According to Hauser, the science fiction elements were not initially planned but developed organically as visual concepts evolved into a narrative framework.

== Production ==
Memory of Princess Mumbi was written, directed, and produced, by Damien Hauser, who also served as editor and cinematographer. It is his fourth feature film.

Principal photography took place in Kenya, with production adopting a minimalist approach involving a small crew and on-location shooting. The film incorporates both practical locations and digital techniques, including the use of artificial intelligence for visual effects and set extensions.

The project was produced under Hauser's companies Out Of My Mind Films and Hauserfilm, with support from Swiss Films and the Red Sea Film Fund. Co-producers include Kaleem Aftab and Shandra Apondi.

== Release and reception ==
Upon its Venice Film Festival premiere on 1 September 2025, Memory of Princess Mumbi was the first Kenyan production chosen for its Venice Days (Giornate degli Autori) lineup. It subsequently screened in the Centrepiece section of the Toronto International Film Festival.

The film received positive reviews after its Venice screening. Stephen Dalton of The Film Verdict praised the set design, adding: "There are plot holes, ragged edges and stilted performances here. But they scarcely matter when the end result is so formally inventive, tearing up cinematic conventions, keeping us on our toes with a feast of images and ideas." Kelvin Kariuki called it "a fever dream...ambitious in scope, yet refreshingly simple when it needs to be." He worried that the film's AI use would polarise its perception, but otherwise concluded that it made a perfect fit and commended Hauser on his strategy. Cineuropa contributor Vittora Scarpa wrote, "[A]t times chaotic but always entertaining to watch, [Mumbi] reflects the vitality and will to experiment of [Hauser's] young age."

At the 2025 Zurich Film Festival, Memory of Princess Mumbi received the Critics' Jury Award.
