= Jackie Nyaminde =

Kenyan actor

- Born: 12 October 1983 (age 42)
- Other names: Awilo; Wilbroda
- Occupation: Actress

Jackie Nyaminde (born 1983) is a Kenyan actress whose stage names are Wilbroda and Awilo.

== Early life ==
Nyaminde was born on 12 October 1983, and raised in Nairobi West, Langata and Rongai in Kajiado County. She was the first born into a family of six and she attended Kongoni Primary School and Uhuru Gardens Primary School in Nairobi, for secondary education she attended Koru Girls High School in Kisumu County.

== Career ==
Nyaminde took a short course on film production after high school. Her acting started at the Kenya National Theatre before 2007. She travelled to different parts of the country visiting high schools to perform set books with other Kenyan actors. She acts in a local popular show Papa Shirandula which is aired on Citizen TV.

She has worked as a radio presenter at several Kenyan radio stations and is currently (2021) working at Milele Fm, co-hosting with Alex Mwakideu on the Morning Show. She previously worked at Citizen radio alongside Inspekta Mwala and Luchivya. She is also a philanthropist and co-founded a charity with fellow comedians. She champions many causes, among them child health and hygiene.

In October 2025, Jackie is set to star in the Maisha Magic Plus telenovela, Lazizi alongside Hellen Keli and Mwaniki Mageria.
