= Single Kiasi =

2022 Kenyan TV series

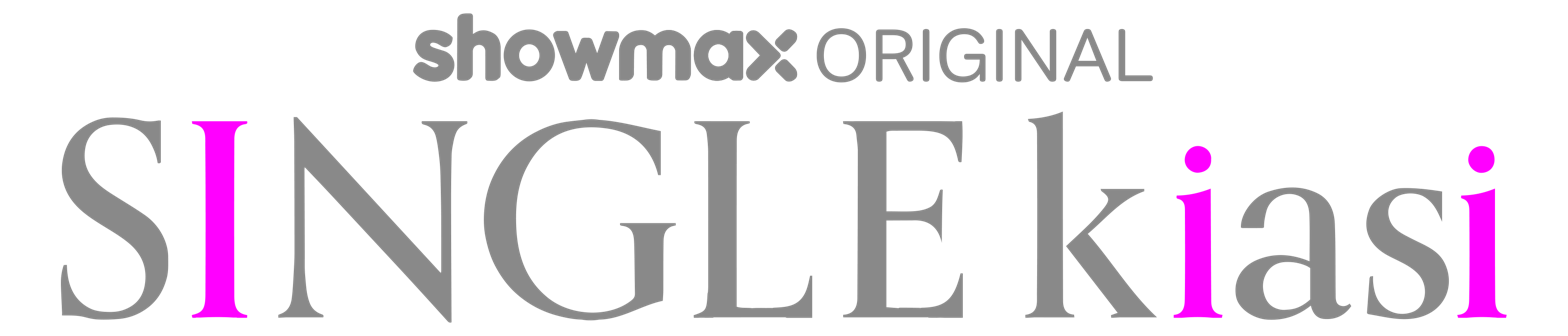
- Genre: Drama
- Written by: Jim Malakwen; Carolyne Kemunto; Jazzmine Maina; Grace Odhiambo; Serah Mwihaki
- Directed by: Philippe Bresson; Grace Kahaki; Robby Bresson (Season 1)
- Starring: Gathoni Mutua; Faith Kibathi; Minne Kariuki
- Country of origin: Kenya
- Original languages: English; Swahili
- No. of seasons: 4
- No. of episodes: 52

Production
- Producers: Philippe Bresson; Grace Kahaki
- Running time: 20-30 minutes

Original release
- Network: Showmax
- Release: 20 January 2022 – December 3, 2025

Single Kiasi is a Kenyan drama series produced by Insginia Productions for African streamer, Showmax.

Gathoni Mutua, Faith Kibathi and RHON star Minne Kariuki play the female leads. The show is mainly co-produced and co-directed by Philippe Bresson and Grace Kahaki, the creators of The Chocolate Empire and Netflix's Kash Money.

Single Kiasi is one of the most watched shows on Showmax since its debut in 2022.

In September 2025, Showmax renewed and announced the show's fourth season.

== Plot ==
Single Kiasi follows the lives of Sintamei, Mariah and Rebecca, as they navigate marriage, relationships, and their careers in the Nairobi's concrete jungle. It also explores the strong bond of friendship that these women share, knowing that even when the world crumbles around them, they will always have each other.

Season 2 catches up with the trio after a bombshell finalé in season 1. Sintamei starts her own law firm with her business partner and old friend Olivia. Having lost JK, Mariah starts a steamy encounter with a plastic surgeon. Rebecca’s financial struggles continue following her break up with Eric who gets a new girlfriend.

Season 3 follows Rebecca still reeling from being left at the altar and finds solace in her new job as an assistant to her ex-boyfriend, Nick. As they spend more time together, old feelings resurface, and they cautiously embark on a romantic relationship once again. Sintamei embarks on a journey of exploration by embracing polyamory with Giselle and Marcel, while Mariah grapples with the realisation that her once unwavering beauty is fading. Desperate to regain her youthful allure, Mariah resorts to extreme measures to alter her physical appearance.

Season 4 picks up from the dramatic cliffhanger with Sintamei’s world spinning out of control after a night of questionable choices with Nick. Consumed by guilt, she immerses herself in her work, striving to elevate her law firm's profile. However, the arrival of a charismatic and adventurous stranger tempts Sintamei to explore a dangerous path. Meanwhile, Rebecca and Nick's budding romance is tested by mounting family pressures, largely orchestrated by Nick's manipulative mother and his snobbish aunt. Mariah having survived heartbreak and humiliation in the previous season, is determined to shed the victim narrative. She embraces her power and gets entangled into a new relationship where she finds control.

== Cast ==
- Gathoni Mutua as Sintamei, an overachieving, career-focused lawyer who seems to have the life that any woman would dream of.
- Minne Kariuki as Mariah, a sassy woman with a taste for the finer things in life, who uses her looks to get whatever she wants.
- Faith Kibathi as Rebecca, a housewife and a mother of two who has lived with her high school sweetheart for nine years despite not being officially married.
- Kevin Maina as Richie, a young man who has regular flings with older women for money. He is also Mariah's cousin and roommate.
- Michael Munyoki as Eric, Rebecca's high school sweet and father of her two children.
- Lenana Kariba as Nick, a well known TV star and Rebecca's love interest. The two take steps to make the relationship official in season 4.
- Brian Abajah as Andrew, a young intern lawyer at Sintamei's law firm and serves as her love interest in Season 1. They later go their separate ways.
- Mburu Kimani as JK, Mariah's love interest in Season 1.
- Grace Wacuka as Olivia, Sintamei's friend and law firm partner introduced in Season 1.
- Jimmy Gathu as Dickson, Mariah's sinister and possessive lover introduced in Season 3.
- Wanjira Longauer as Stephanie, Sintamei's Senior Partner at her law firm. She is introduced in Season 3. She is hardworking and will challenge Sintamei's work ethic and loyalty.
- Joy Kendi as Joy, Mariah's arch rival.
- Hellen Keli as Delilah, Ritchie's older girlfriend introduced in Season 3. She has plans to start a family, unbeknownst to Ritchie.
- Ciku Shire and Quincy Rapando, as Giselle and Marcel, a polyamorous couple pursuing Sintamei in Season 2.
- Lucarelli Onyango as Kevin, Sintamei's husband of 12 years that secretly lives a double family life. They eventually later go their separate ways in Season 1.
- Derek Bbanga as Henry, Sintamei's boss at the law firm in Season 1.
- Walter Opiyo as Steve, Sintamei's nemesis, who is promoted over her in Season 1.
- Ian Mbugua as Dr Bernard, a plastic surgeon who has a fling with Mariah in Season 2.
- Brian Ogola as Chris, Sintamei's new love interest with a complicated past introduced in Season 4.
- Xavier Ywaya as Boni, Mariah's new love interest that seems to be living a double life.
- Maqbull Mohammed as Mr. Kahaki, a man to who takes a liking to Mariah but things get complicated when his wife has other plans. He is introduced in Season 4.
- Silayio Kirisuaha as Mrs. Kahaki, a wealthy woman that gives Mariah a very interesting proposal. She is introduced in Season 4.
- Daina Njuguna as Rachel, Mariah's and Joy's childhood friend. She is introduced in Season 4.

Content creators and influencers Yvonne Khisa, Mariah Mariah, Esther Kazungu, Anyiko Owoko, Nancy Katheu, Shelmith Mukami, Diana Kimani and Ms Musau cameo in Season 4.

== Episodes ==
Season	Episodes	Originally released	
Season	Episodes	First released	Last released
1	13	January 20, 2022	April 14, 2022
2	13	January 16, 2023	April 10, 2023
3	13	March 5, 2024	May 28, 2024
4	13	September 17, 2025	December 3, 2025

=== Season 1 (2022) ===
No.	Title	Directed by	Written by	Original release date
1	"Episode 1"	Philippe Bresson	Serah Mwihaki	20 January 2022
We are introduced to Mariah, Sintamei and Rebecca. Mariah is kinda single; Rebecca is kinda married and Sintamei is about to find out she is kinda married, too. Her husband for over seven years is getting married and she is not the bride.
2	"Episode 2"	Philippe Bresson & Grace Kahaki	Serah Mwihaki	27 January 2022
Sintamei discovers that her husband, Kevin, will marry another woman. While the girls comfort Sintamei, Kevin causally comes home, after humiliating her. He starts talking about rebuilding their home.
3	"Episode 3"	Philippe Bresson & Grace Kahaki	Serah Mwihaki	3 February 2022
Sintamei is still recovering from the shock of Kevin's actions. Rebecca discovers that Eric was fired months ago for stealing and has not been paying rent. JK breaks up with Mariah after their scandalous relationship goes viral on social media.
4	"Episode 4"	Philippe Bresson & Grace Kahaki	Serah Mwihaki	10 February 2022
Sintamei and Andrew finally hook up. Mariah and JK go at it again after she visits his office unannounced but well prepared. Rebecca's children are out of school and there is still no money. Eric's brilliant idea of getting them out of broke-dom is drinking and gambling.
5	"Episode 5"	Philippe Bresson & Grace Kahaki	Serah Mwihaki	17 February 2022
Mariah and Rebecca join Sintamei in the search for a new man. JK has finally dumped Mariah and she realises that she is not much without him. Eric's drinking habit and his inability to pay the bills frustrate Rebecca, which leads the landlord to repossess some of their furniture. Sintamei confronts her over the misogyny she has experienced at the office. The girls go out and Rebecca meets a potential suitor.
6	"Episode 6"	Philippe Bresson & Grace Kahaki	Serah Mwihaki	24 February 2022
Rebecca and her children move in with Sintamei, away from Eric's lies and drunkenness. Nick invites Rebecca for a date. Kevin and Sintamei begin working on their divorce plans. Mariah accompanies Sintamei to a dinner date organised by her boss, Henry, which eventually turns sour.
7	"Episode 7"	Philippe Bresson & Grace Kahaki	Serah Mwihaki	3 March 2022
Mariah recovers from a tricky situation involving Sintamei's boss, Henry. Sintamei missed on her most deserved promotion and attempts to sue him for attempted rape.
8	"Episode 8"	Philippe Bresson & Grace Kahaki	Serah Mwihaki	10 March 2022
JK decides to gift Mariah's apartment to his new younger girlfriend. Rebecca and Nick's situationship flourishes. Sintamei faces new hurdles with her petty boss, Henry.
9	"Episode 9"	Philippe Bresson & Grace Kahaki	Serah Mwihaki	17 March 2022
Becky confronts Nick about his alleged ex-wife. Sintamei discovers she is pregnant and it could be Andy's. Mariah makes a trip back home.
10	"Episode 10"	Philippe Bresson & Grace Kahaki	Serah Mwihaki	24 March 2022
Mariah's trauma pushes her to almost murder her stepfather, who sexually assaulted her, but she doesn’t go through with it. Rebecca confronts Nick again.
11	"Episode 11"	Robby Bresson	Carolyne Kemunto	31 March 2022
Sintamei's archnemesis, Steve, catches her kissing Andy and threatens to expose her. After confronting her family demons, Mariah resumes living a fake life.
12	"Episode 12"	Philippe Bresson & Grace Kahaki	Grace Adhiambo	8 April 2022
Sintamei quits her job from the law firm. JK reconciles with Mariah. Rebecca sends her children back to Eric, who has turned a new leaf and is ready to be a faithful husband, committed father and diligent businessman.
13	"Episode 13"	Philippe Bresson & Grace Kahaki	Carolyne Kemunto & Serah Mwihaki	14 April 2022
Rebecca's entanglement with Nick threatens her family. Mariah is pregnant, but JK is not the father, and she cannot pinpoint who is. All hell breaks loose when she mentions she is pregnant, oblivious that JK can no longer father children. Sintamei's unethical relationship with Andy is put to the test.

=== Season 2 (2023) ===
No.	Title	Directed by	Written by	Original release date
1	"Episode 1"	Philippe Bresson & Grace Kahaki	Unknown	16 January 2023
Mariah attends an ex-lover's funeral. Sintamei establishes her fledgling law firm with the backing of Olivia, a wealthy old friend from college.
2	"Episode 2"	Philippe Bresson & Grace Kahaki	Carolyne Kemunto	23 January 2023
The girls catch up at a paint-and-sip where Mariah tells them about an encounter with an attractive doctor. Meanwhile, Sintamei and Andrew are at loggerheads.
3	"Episode 3"	Philippe Bresson & Grace Kahaki	Unknown	30 January 2023
Rebecca's financial challenges present an opportunity for unwanted romantic advances. Sintamei deals with the emotional toll of her tragedy with Olivia and Rebecca's help.
4	"Episode 4"	Philippe Bresson & Grace Kahaki	Unknown	6 February 2023
Rebecca drops in on Eric unannounced. Mariah drops Dr Bernard off at the hospital and comes to Ritchie's rescue at the restaurant. Will Sintamei forgive her?
5	"Episode 5"	Philippe Bresson & Grace Kahaki	Unknown	13 February 2023
Steve apologises to Sintamei for his past behaviour. Rebecca reels under Kiarie's increasing advances. Meanwhile, things remain awkward between Mariah and Sintamei.
6	"Episode 6"	Philippe Bresson & Grace Kahaki	Unknown	20 February 2023
Rebecca, Sintamei and Olivia leave for Naivasha to celebrate Olivia's bachelorette party. Meanwhile, Mariah's journey to the party is filled with many obstacles.
7	"Episode 7"	Philippe Bresson & Grace Kahaki	Unknown	27 February 2023
Mariah confronts Rodger about hitting on her while engaged to Olivia. Sintamei and Steve agree to collaborate on a high-stakes pitch, while Rebecca endures another humiliating day at school.
8	"Episode 8"	Philippe Bresson & Grace Kahaki	Unknown	6 March 2023
Tax agents are sniffing around at the eatery. Olivia discovers what Mariah did. Sintamei goes on a memorable date. Olivia's actions might jeopardise the firm's future.
9	"Episode 9"	Philippe Bresson & Grace Kahaki	Unknown	13 March 2023
Rebecca confronts Eric about the money he stashed at the house. Sintamei and Steve have a successful pitch. Will they make the shortlist? Mariah meets a well-known celebrity.
10	"Episode 10"	Philippe Bresson & Grace Kahaki	Unknown	20 March 2023
Rebecca and Edward finally consummate their relationship. Unfortunately, an unforeseen issue rears its ugly head under the sheets. Rebecca stages an intervention for Sintamei and Mariah.
11	"Episode 11"	Philippe Bresson & Grace Kahaki	Unknown	27 March 2023
Edward offers to help Jayden with homework, with dire consequences. Mariah and Derek go on a fun date, while Sintamei decides whether to pursue a relationship with Marcel.
12	"Episode 12"	Philippe Bresson & Grace Kahaki	Unknown	3 April 2023
Sintamei's visit to Marcel and Giselle's apartment pushes her to decide on the offer to join their polyamorous relationship. The romance between Mariah and Derek reaches a crescendo.
13	"Episode 13"	Philippe Bresson & Grace Kahaki	Unknown	10 March 2023
Will Rebecca accept Eric's wedding proposal? Mariah is shocked when she is introduced to Derek's parents. Meanwhile, the mysterious caller who has been hounding Eric finally reveals herself.

=== Season 3 (2024) ===
No.	Title	Directed by	Written by	Original release date
1	"Episode 1"	Philippe Bresson & Grace Kahaki	Unknown	5 March 2024
Rebecca's life is in shambles, while Mariah confronts a blast from the past. Sintamei makes a bold move.
2	"Episode 2"	Philippe Bresson & Grace Kahaki	Unknown	12 March 2024
Mariah deals with the aftermath of her leaked sex tape while Rebecca struggles to get her life together. Sintamei navigates her new relationship.
3	"Episode 3"	Philippe Bresson & Grace Kahaki	Unknown	19 March 2024
Mariah has to face off with Grace Kariuki over her house. Sintamei provides the legal support needed to help her fight for her house. Rebecca meets an unsavoury character.
4	"Episode 4"	Philippe Bresson & Grace Kahaki	Unknown	26 March 2024
Cracks begin to appear in Sintamei's relationship, while Mariah makes a bold step. Rebecca is faced with a difficult choice.
5	"Episode 5"	Philippe Bresson & Grace Kahaki	Unknown	2 April 2024
Rebecca gets a new lease on life. Mariah struggles with the beast of brokenness, while Sintamei grapples with her past.
6	"Episode 6"	Philippe Bresson & Grace Kahaki	Unknown	9 April 2024
The ladies have a girls' night out to try to forget their current problems, but the consequences of that night haunt them the next day.
7	"Episode 7"	Philippe Bresson & Grace Kahaki	Unknown	16 April 2024
Sintamei deals with a blast from the past, and Mariah struggles to get back on her feet. Rebecca makes a bold move.
8	"Episode 8"	Philippe Bresson & Grace Kahaki	Unknown	23 April 2024
Sintamei faces off with Andrew in more ways than one. Mariah fights to bring home the bacon in the wake of the viral feud with Joy. Rebecca's patience is tested by the men in her life.
9	"Episode 9"	Philippe Bresson & Grace Kahaki	Unknown	30 April 2024
Mariah is enjoying being wooed and is finally living the life she's longed for. Rebecca balances being a mom, a friend and a 'Special' work assignment.
10	"Episode 10"	Philippe Bresson & Grace Kahaki	Unknown	7 May 2024
Rebecca meets Nick's mother and tries her best to impress her, while Mariah is trying to fit in Dickson's world, but it's complicated. Sintamei catches a nasty STD and has to inform all her exes.
11	"Episode 11"	Philippe Bresson & Grace Kahaki	Unknown	14 May 2024
Mariah is riding high on the wave of her new relationship with Dickson. Rebecca is dealing with a hormonal teenager while trying to keep their home safe. Sintamei is righting her wrongs.
12	"Episode 12"	Philippe Bresson & Grace Kahaki	Unknown	21 May 2024
Mariah is dealing with the aftermath of Dickson's wrath. Sintamei signs up for a journey of healing as Rebecca and Nick try to work things out.
13	"Episode 13"	Philippe Bresson & Grace Kahaki	Unknown	28 May 2024
Rebecca and Nick come to a crossroads, and Mariah fights for her freedom. Sintamei makes a horrible mistake.

=== Season 4 (2025) ===
No.	Title	Directed by	Written by	Original release date
1	"Murder She Wrote"	Philippe Bresson & Grace Kahaki	Carolyne Kemunto	17 September 2025
Mariah and Ritchie try to cover up a murder, leading to disastrous consequences. Sintamei does something unspeakable, while Rebecca fights for her relationship.
2	"Expose"	Philippe Bresson & Grace Kahaki	Carolyne Kemunto	24 September 2025
Mariah and Ritchie have to find a way to get away from a deranged Dick. Sintamei plays detective at the risk of fumbling a client. Rebecca has a life changing doctor's appointment but Nick is M.I.A.
3	"Go Nutz"	Philippe Bresson & Grace Kahaki	Carolyne Kemunto	1 October 2025
Sintamei and Nick are trying to get the confession Letter from Rebecca, but Eric stands in their way. Mariah revels in her new status as Richie tries his best not to…."nut".
4	"Awakening"	Philippe Bresson & Grace Kahaki	Carolyne Kemunto	8 October 2025
Mariah has a new man in her life, while Sintamei experiences a sexual awakening. Rebecca gets an unexpected surprise.
5	"Balance"	Philippe Bresson & Grace Kahaki	Carolyne Kemunto	15 October 2025
Boni redeems himself in the eyes of Mariah, as Sintamei tries to find a work / life balance. Rebecca and Nick's engagement news is not received well.
6	"Contempt"	Philippe Bresson & Grace Kahaki	Carolyne Kemunto	22 October 2025
Rebecca and Nick's relationship is disrupted by an unexpected blast from the past, as Mariah and Joy inadvertently ruin a wedding. Sintamei handles a strange case.
7	"Chaos"	Philippe Bresson & Grace Kahaki	Carolyne Kemunto	29 October 2025
Sintamei has a crazy day at the office but Chris has just the thing to help her blow off some steam. Mariah and Joy rekindle their friendship but it doesn't last. Rebecca's love life is a rollercoaster.
8	"Proposals"	Philippe Bresson & Grace Kahaki	Carolyne Kemunto	5 November 2025
Rebecca and Nick's relationship reaches a breaking point, as Sintamei gets an unwelcome surprise. Mariah gets an interesting offer.
9	"A Rock and A Hard Place"	Philippe Bresson & Grace Kahaki	Carolyne Kemunto	12 November 2025
Rebecca is having trouble with her teenage daughter. Mariah is considering Mrs Kahaki's proposition. Sintamei is caught between a rock and a hard place with Chris and his wife.
10	"Choices"	Philippe Bresson & Grace Kahaki	Carolyne Kemunto	19 November 2025
Sintamei has to make a difficult choice, while Mariah gets a pleasant surprise. Rebecca works to mend the relationships in her life.
11	"Upside Down"	Philippe Bresson & Grace Kahaki	Carolyne Kemunto	26 November 2025
Mariah gets an unexpected proposal, while Sintamei makes a bold choice. Rebecca's world is turned upside down when Eric sues for sole custody.
12	"Small Wins"	Philippe Bresson & Grace Kahaki	Carolyne Kemunto	3 December 2025
Sintamei's life seems to be falling apart, while Mariah experiences unlikely triumphs. Rebecca fights to keep her family.

== Production ==
=== Development ===
Showmax announced Single Kiasi in January 2022 becoming the second Kenyan Original series after the Kalasha-nominated Crime and Justice, and the streamer's third Original title in the country following the Original film Baba Twins. Insignia Productions, the studio behind Changing Times and New Beginnings, was announced to helm the show with the creative duo Philippe Bresson and Grace Kahaki serving as co-directors alongside Robby Bresson. The show is an adaptation of hit South African series, Unmarried

The show had its exclusive premiere at Social House Nairobi during the company's first ever content showcase that including a preview of Crime and Justice Season 2.

Following the success of season one, Showmax commissioned a new season with a premiere date in 2023. Gathoni Mutua, Minne Kariuki and Faith Kibathi were confirmed to reprise their roles as leads Sintamei, Mariah and Rebecca respectively. Also returning are Michael Munyoki, Brian Abajah, Kevin Maina, Walter Bruce Opiyo, Derek Bbanga and Maggie Kiundi.

The first teaser trailer for Season 2 dropped in January 2023. New cast members were confirmed to join the season. This included Grace Wacuka as Olivia, a new female lead and Sintamei's wealthy friend who might just be the answer to her problems; Fidel Maithya, Quincy Rapando, Ian Mbugua, Mufasa Kibet aka Mufasa Poet, and Ciku Shire.

The show was renewed for a third season with teaser revealed in February 2024. New featured cast included Nini Wacera, Jimmi Gathu, Ilya Frank, Briyanna Wanjiku, and Wanjira Longauer (Disconnect: The Wedding Planner), with cameo appearances from Joy Kendi, Fena Gitu, Bushra Sakshi, Yvonne Kisa, Kamene Goro, Anne Mwaura and Julius Otieno.

Season four was announced in September 2025 alongside the new cast additions including Brian Ogola, Xavier Ywaya, Maqbul Mohammed, and Silayio Neema. On 2 October, Showmax hosted the premiere event for the fourth season at The Monaco Nairobi. The event was attended by the show's leads and supporting cast.

== Release ==
Showmax released season 1 on January 20, 2022 with subsequent episodes dropping every Monday. Season 2 and 3 debuted on the streamer on January 16, 2023 and March 5, 2024 respectively. Season 4 dropped on September 17, 2025.

== Critical reception ==
Season 2 received positive to mixed reactions. In a positive review for Season 2, Hapa Kenya's Faith Wambui said ''Single Kiasi has done a great job in capturing the day-to-day lives of different kinds of girls you will meet in Nairobi. There's the boss babe with a struggling love life, the loyal wifey who gets cheated on and the wanna-be socialite living a fake life. It's an interesting series with a captivating storyline that appeals to both women and men.''

Sinema Focus' Kelvin Kariuki added: "Single Kiasi is good enough to have on a cosy weekend binge that will have you smiling and enjoying good filmmaking, maybe more than once. But I doubt it will punch differently on different rewatches. That's what makes shows like Sex and the City or Insecure so iconic: you rewatch them at a different age and feel like you are watching them again from a newer perspective because you grow with the characters, not the familiar things that happen in their lives.''

Season 3 received mixed reactions. Sinema Focus' Kelvin Kariuki in his mixed review for Season 3 said, ''Despite a shaky start, uneven pacing and repetitive storytelling, this season finally ventures into bold and uncharted territory as it reaches its conclusion.''

=== Awards and nominations ===
Year	Award	Category	Recipient(s)	Result	Ref.
2024	Kalasha International TV and Film Awards	Best TV Drama	Phillipe Bresson & Grace Kahaki	Nominated	
2024	Kalasha International TV and Film Awards	Best Lead Actress in a TV Drama	Faith Kibathi	Nominated	
2024	Kalasha International TV and Film Awards	Best Supporting Actor in a TV Drama	Michael Munyoki	Nominated	
2024	Kalasha International TV and Film Awards	Best Viewers’ Choice (TV Drama)	Single Kiasi	Nominated	
2025	Zanzibar International Film Festival	Best TV Drama	Phillipe Bresson & Grace Kahaki	Nominated	
2026	Kalasha International Film and TV Awards	Best TV Drama	Phillipe Bresson & Grace Kahaki	Nominated	
2026	Kalasha International Film and TV Awards	Best Lead Actor - TV Drama	Kelvin Maina	Nominated	
2026	Kalasha International Film and TV Awards	Best Lead Actress - TV Drama	Minne Kariuki	Nominated	
2026	Kalasha International Film and TV Awards	Best TV Director	Phillippe Bresson & Grace Kahaki	Nominated	
2026	Kalasha International Film and TV Awards	Best TV Scriptwriter	Carol Kemunto, Jazzmine Maina, Grace Adhiambo and Jim Malakwen	Nominated	
2026	Kalasha International Film and TV Awards	People's Choice Award - TV Drama	Phillipe Bresson & Grace Kahaki	Nominated	
2026	Zanzibar International Film Festival	Best TV Drama Series (East Africa)	Phillippe Bresson & Grace Kahaki	Nominated	
2026	Zanzibar International Film Festival	Best Actor in a TV Drama (East Africa)	Kelvin Maina	Nominated	
2026	Zanzibar International Film Festival	Best Actress in a TV Drama (East Africa)	Minne Kariuki	Nominated	
