= Likarion Wainaina =

Kenyan filmmaker

- Born: Likarion Wainaina; August 20, 1987 (age 39); Moscow, Russia
- Occupations: Director, cinematographer, editor, producer, actor
- Years active: 2007–present

Likarion Wainaina (born 20 August 1987), is a Russian–born Kenyan filmmaker. He is best known as the director of critically acclaimed shorts Between the Lines and Bait as well as most awarded Kenyan film in history, Supa Modo. In addition to directing, he is a cinematographer, editor, producer and actor.

== Personal life ==
He was born on 20 August 1987 in Moscow, Russia to Kenyan parents. When he was four years old, he moved to Kenya with his family. He has one sister and two brothers.

== Career ==
He started by making films and then later moved to theater. He has been a member of the Phoenix Players theater in Nairobi since 2007. Later he worked as a theater director. In the meantime, he also worked in the film industry as a gaffer and cinematographer. As a cinematographer he worked on a number of documentaries, commercials and television sitcoms. In 2013, he founded the company Kibanda Pictures.

In 2013, he made the short film Between the Lines which later became the first Kenyan Film to be projected on an IMAX screen in Kenya. The short received critical acclaim and then nominated at the AMCVA awards 2015 for Best New Online Media Award. Then he directed the short film Bait in 2015, which was selected at the 48-Hour Film Project Festival. The shot also won several awards including Best Director, Audience Choice awards and Judges Choice awards. It was also selected as one of the top short films screened at the 2016 Cannes Film Festival. In 2018, he produced short film, My Faith, which won the Best East African Film during the Mashariki Film Festival.

In 2018, Wainaina made his acting debut with the film Wavamizi. That same year, he made his directorial debut with the film Supa Modo, which was critically acclaimed. The film had its premiere at 68th Berlin International Film Festival. It was later selected as the Kenyan entry for the Best Foreign Language Film at the 91st Academy Awards, but it was not nominated. With all these awards, the film becoming the most-awarded film in Kenya and a critics’ favorite.

His television work includes commercial advertisements for Pascha milk and Santa Maria, Kenyan food brands. Wainaina has directed nine Africa Magic Original Films (AMOF) and a TV sitcom titled Classmates. In 2016, he made the television serial Auntie Boss! which aired on NTV after the death of original director Derrick Omfwoko Aswani. Meanwhile, he was the cinematographer for the music videos of Sarabi Band which made 'Tumechoka' and 'Haujali' as well as cinematography in the music video 'Loneliness' sung by Liron.

In 2022 Wainaina directed the Kibanda Pictures political series County 49 for Showmax. County 49 follows the political leaders of the fictional Bwatele County, Kenya’s 49th county. The series stars Wakio Mzenge, Nyokabi Macharia, Ainea Ojiambo, Maqbul Mohammed, Martin Githinji, Peter Kawa, Benson Ojuwa, Nick Kwach, Emmanuel Mugo, Angela Mwandanda, and Sam Psenjen.

In September 2024, Showmax released Subterranea, Kenya's first Sci-fi series directed by Wainaina. He described the series as "Big Brother meets Survivor meets Silo”

In July 2026, Likarion directed and wrote Anam's Wake, a psychological thriller feature starring Marima Wanjiru, Samson Omondi, Peter Kawa, Ruth Apondi and Gathoni Mutua. The movie follows Anam (played by Marima), a professional mourner trained to summon death and negotiate the passage of souls while shutting down her own grief. The movie had a wide theatre release across the country between July and September.

== Filmography ==
Year	Title	Role	Genre	Ref.
2013	Between the Lines	Director, cinematographer, writer, producer, editor	Short film	
2014	Virgin Goat	Cinematographer	Short film	
2014	Auntie Boss	Director	TV series	
2015	Is This Your Daughter?	Cinematographer	Short film	
2015	Bait	Director, cinematographer, producer	Short film	
2016–2020	Auntie Boss!	Director	TV series	
2017	Freedom	Voter	Film	
2017	News Just In	Cinematographer	TV series	
2017	Varshita!	Director	TV series	
2018	Wavamizi	Actor: Swahili Trader	Short film	
2018	Supa Modo	Director, writer, Actor: Motorcycle mounted thief	Film	
2019	I Had to Bury Cucu	Cinematographer	Short film	
2020	Morning After	Cinematographer	Short film	
2022	County 49	Director	TV series	
2024	Subterranea	Director	TV series	
2026	Anam's Wake	Director & Writer	Feature film	

== Awards ==
He received the Best Director of Photography award at the 6th Kalasha International Film & TV Awards.

== See also ==
- List of Kenyan submissions for the Academy Award for Best International Feature Film
- List of submissions to the 91st Academy Awards for Best Foreign Language Film
- Filmfest Hamburg
- Zlín Film Festival
- Zanzibar International Film Festival
- 2015 Africa Magic Viewers Choice Awards
- 6th Kalasha International Film & TV Awards
- List of Kenyan films
