= Timeline of LGBTQ history in Kenya =

Map of Kenya bearing the colors of the LGBTQ flag.

This article is a timeline of notable events affecting the lesbian, gay, bisexual, transgender, and queer (LGBTQ) community in Kenya. During pre-colonial times, various expressions of sexual diversity were integrated into the cultures of Swahili-speaking populations and ethnic groups such as the Teso, Karamojong, and Nandi. However, the beginning of Kenya's colonization by the British Empire in 1895 brought with it the imposition of Christianity and Victorian morality in the territory, as well as laws present in other colonized territories that, among other provisions, criminalized homosexuality.

When Kenya achieved independence from the United Kingdom in 1963, colonial-era criminal laws were kept in place, so homosexuality remained illegal. During the following decades, sexual diversity was rarely discussed in the country, and authorities such as President Jomo Kenyatta preferred to deny its existence. However, there are reports of networks of LGBTQ people socializing in various cities across the country during the 20th century, with Mombasa standing out as the least intolerant towards gender minorities. In 1999, the first LGBTQ rights activism group in the country's history also emerged, known as Ishtar MSM.

Although LGBTQ people continued to face significant intolerance during the early years of the 21st century, the 2000s also saw a greater push for local LGBTQ activism with the emergence of groups in most major cities across the country and the Gay and Lesbian Coalition of Kenya, as well as the first public rallies demanding reforms in favor of equality. There was also an expansion in inclusive social spaces for LGBTQ people. However, homophobic attacks continued to be recurrent in different parts of the country, often fueled by collective hysteria.

A gradual change for LGBTQ people began in the mid-2010s, first with an increase in positive artistic representations, then with a series of judicial rulings that, among other rights, approved the official registration of an LGBTQ organization, recognized the identity of a trans woman and revoked the government ban on showing the lesbian film Rafiki (2018) in theaters. Social tolerance towards sexual diversity also increased, although arrests based on the law criminalizing homosexuality continued to be present, as well as homophobic hate speech, which continued to generate news until the beginning of the 2020s, particularly from conservative groups as a reaction to the judicial rulings in favor of the rights of sexual minorities.

== Before the 21st Century ==
- Numerous reports by European explorers published from the 19th century onward documented the existence of terms among Kenyan communities to refer to people who assumed gender roles other than their assigned sex at birth, as well as to sexual relationships between people of the same sex, both stratified and egalitarian.

=== 1895 ===
- The British Empire takes control and colonizes the territory that now forms the Republic of Kenya. Two years later, colonial authorities impose the Indian Penal Code of 1830, thus criminalizing same-sex relations in the country for the first time.

=== 1930 ===
- British colonial authorities replace the Indian Penal Code with the Colonial Office Model Code, which maintained the criminalization of homosexuality.

=== 1963 ===
- December 12: Kenya officially gains independence from the United Kingdom but retains its colonial penal code, so homosexuality remained criminalized under sections 162 and 165.

=== 1975 ===
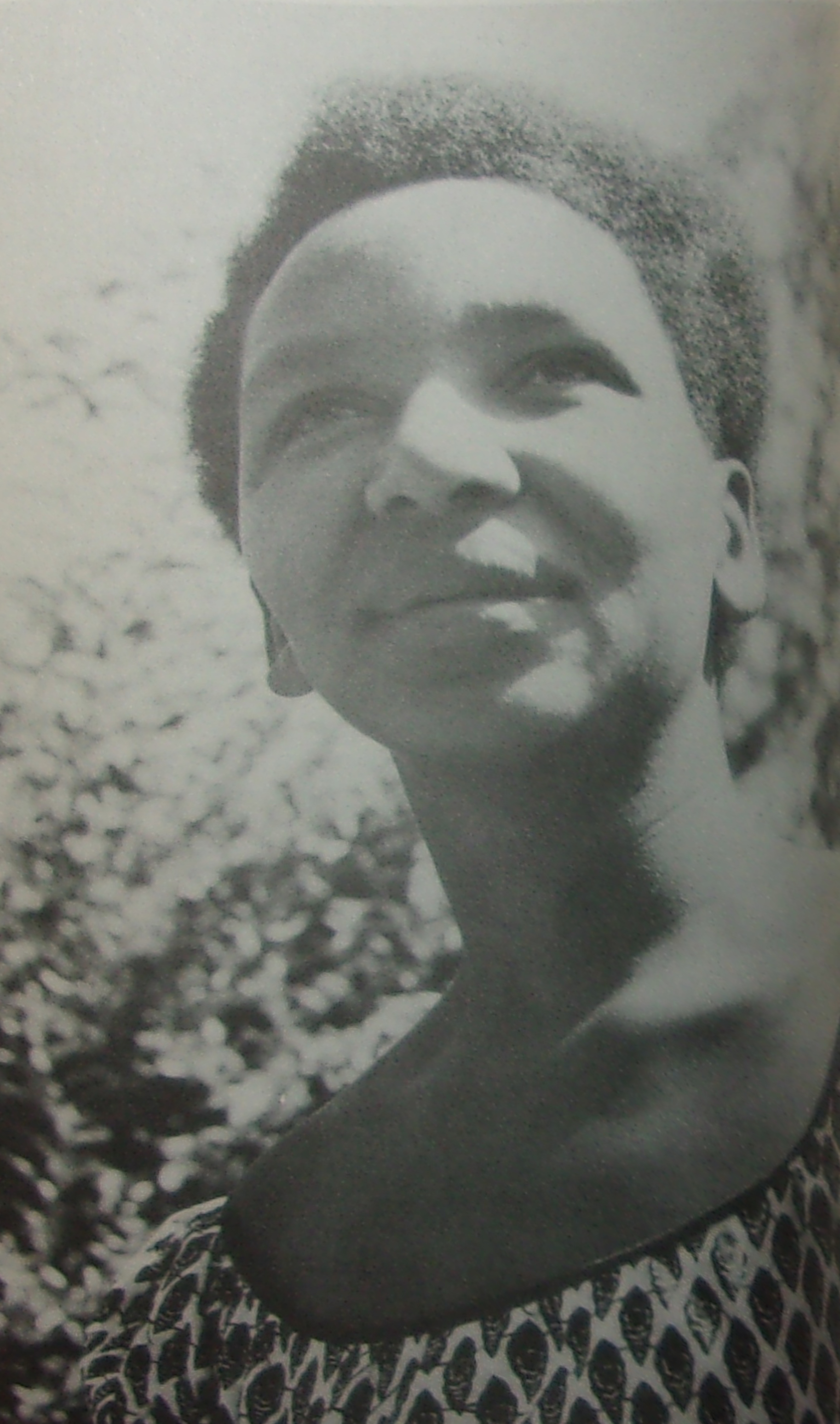
Rebeka Njau, author of the lesbian-themed novel Ripples in the Pool (1975).

- Writer Rebeka Njau publishes the novel Ripples in the Pool, considered one of the first Kenyan literary works to address lesbianism as a central theme.

=== 1984 ===
- The first case of HIV is detected in the country.

=== 1999 ===
- September 29: President Daniel arap Moi attacks LGBTQ people in a speech, stating that homosexuality goes against African traditions and biblical teachings.
- The Ishtar MSM group is established, considered the first LGBTQ activism group in the country.

== 21st century ==
=== 2000s ===
==== 2001 ====
- The Parliament of Kenya approves the Children Act, which explicitly forbids gay and lesbian people from adopting children.

==== 2006 ====
- The Gay and Lesbian Coalition of Kenya (Galck+) is established.

==== 2007 ====
- January: GALK members attend the World Social Forum, which was held that year in Kenya, and set up a booth to discuss LGBTQ rights and art, in what is considered one of the first public LGBTQ activism events in the country.

=== 2010s ===
==== 2010 ====
- February 12: Riots erupt in the town of Mtwapa after false rumors spread of a supposed marriage between two men in the town. As part of the protests, conservatives begin a door-to-door search of LGBTQ people.
- November 28: Kenyan Prime Minister Raila Odinga publicly calls for the arrest of gay men. Odinga later retracted this statement, claiming that his remarks were referring to Kenya's constitutional ban on same-sex marriage.
- The High Court of Kenya issues a ruling in the case Richard Muasya v. the Hon. Attorney General, ruling in favor of a person who alleged cruel and degrading treatment due to their intersex status while in a male prison.
- A new Constitution of Kenya is approved, which bans same-sex marriage but at the same time expands human rights protections in the country.
- Members of Galck+ publish the LGBTQ rights book My Way, Your Way or The Right Way.

==== 2011 ====
- September 8: Gay Kenya Trust, an LGBTQ+ group, organizes the country's first LGBTQ+ film festival in Nairobi. The Out Film Festival featured the premiere of Me Only, Kenya's first LGBTQ+ feature film.

==== 2012 ====
- June 26: The first LGBTQ+ Pride event is held in Kenya. The event took place at the United States Embassy in Nairobi and was a forum for LGBTQ activists and allies.
- LGBTQ activist and co-founder of Galck+, David Kuria Mbote, launches his candidacy for the Kenyan Senate in the general elections of the following year, which would have made him the first openly LGBTQ person to run for elected office in the country's history. However, Mbote eventually withdrew from the race citing lack of security and funds to campaign.

==== 2013 ====
- In June, Charles Daniel Balvo, apostolic nuncio of the Catholic Church in Kenya, publicly calls for respect of the rights of LGBTQ+ people.

==== 2014 ====
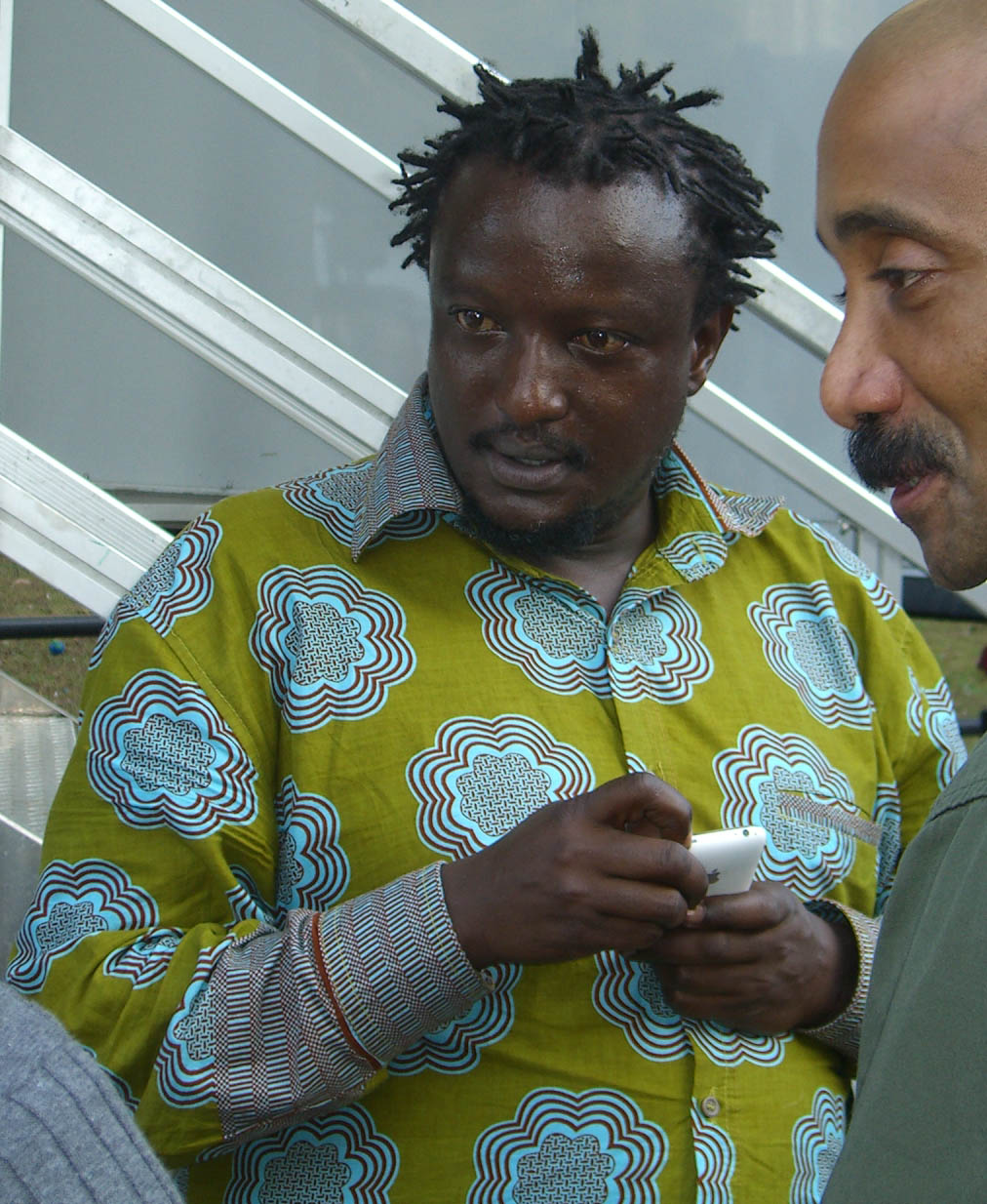
Binyavanga Wainaina, an acclaimed Kenyan writer, came out as gay in January 2014.

- January 18: January 18: Acclaimed Kenyan writer Binyavanga Wainaina publicly announces his homosexuality. That April, Wainaina was included in the Time 100 list as one of the hundred most influential people in the world for the impact him coming out had in Africa.
- Between February and June, hundreds of LGBTQ+ Ugandans flee to Kenya to evade Uganda's Anti-Homosexuality Act and violence.
- In July, Nairobi Police raid Club Envy, arresting around 60 LGBTQ+ people.
- July: A judge from the High Court of Nairobi issues a ruling requiring the official registration of Transgender Education and Advocacy, a transgender rights group.
- October 7: The High Court of Kenya issues a ruling in favor of trans activist Audrey Mbugua, requiring her education records to be updated to match her gender identity.
- October 24: The producer of the Kenyan LGBTQ film "Stories of Our Lives" is arrested by police and charged with not having a filming license. He is later released.
- December 5: The High Court of Kenya issues a ruling in the case Baby A and Another v. Attorney General and Others requiring the government to issue a birth certificate for an intersex child. However, the court leaves the possibility of a permanent change to parliament.

==== 2015 ====
- January 22: Kenyan government representatives notify the United Nations Human Rights Council during the Universal Periodic Review that the country's existing anti-homosexuality law would not be enforced. Despite this, a gay couple was arrested under the law the following month.
- February 14: The Kenyan LGBTQ+ film Stories of Our Lives wins the Jury Prize from the Teddy Award and the second place of the Panorama Audience Award at the Berlin International Film Festival.
- April 24: The Nairobi High Court rules in favor of the LGBTQ+ National Gay and Lesbian Human Rights Commission in a lawsuit seeking to have the state officially register it as a non-governmental organization. The registration agency refused to do so, citing the criminalization of homosexuality in the country as a reason. The ruling was reaffirmed in a 2019 appeal.
- In November, Kenya's parliament rejects a bill seeking to increase the penalty for homosexuality to life imprisonment in ordinary cases and to death by stoning in cases of "aggravated homosexuality".

==== 2016 ====
- In June, the Mombasa High Court issues a ruling affirming the constitutionality of anal examinations to confirm homosexuality, a practice considered as torture by human rights groups.
- Kenyan writer Troy Onyango is nominated for a Pushcart Prize for his transgender-themed short story "The Transfiguration".

==== 2017 ====
- In July, politician and candidate Sam Wairimu is arrested and charged with sodomy after reporting that a man had attacked him with a stick. Police claimed that Wairimu had attempted to have sex with the man who attacked him.

==== 2018 ====
- March 22: Kenya's Court of Appeals reverses the 2016 Mombasa High Court ruling permitting anal examinations on people accused of being homosexual.
- May: LGBTQ film Rafiki becomes the first Kenyan film to be screened at the Cannes Film Festival. However, the film is banned by Kenyan authorities for allegedly "promoting lesbianism".
- June 15: The world's first pride march in a refugee camp takes place in Kakuma. The event was attended by around 200 people, namely LGBTQ+ Ugandan refugees.
- September 21: The High Court of Kenya lifts the ban on the LGBTQ film Rafiki, which becomes a local box office hit.

==== 2019 ====
- May 24: The Nairobi High Court rules that Section 162 of the Penal Code, the section that criminalizes homosexuality, is constitutional in a blow to LGBTQ+ rights. The lawsuit was filed in 2016.

=== 2020s ===
==== 2021 ====
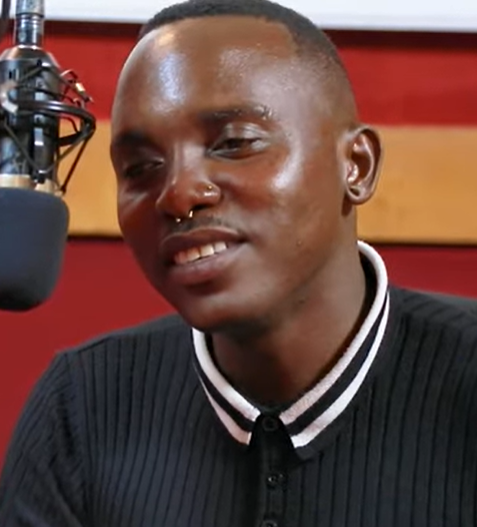
Chimano, member of the band Sauti Sol who revealed his homosexuality in 2021.

- Kenyan singer Chimano, member of one of the continent's most famous bands, Sauti Sol, publicly reveals his homosexuality.

==== 2023 ====
- January 3: LGBTQ+ activist and fashion designer Edwin Chiloba is found dead in Uasin Gishu. His roommate was convicted of his murder in 2024.
- February 24: The Supreme Court of Kenya again issues a ruling upholding the High Court's 2015 decision to allow the LGBTQ+ National Gay and Lesbian Human Rights Commission to remain registered as an official non-governmental organization.

==== 2024 ====
- April 29: The Mombasa High Court issues an order requiring conservative groups to stop inciting violence against LGBTQ+ people. The ruling was due to a wave of homophobic rhetoric stemming from the Supreme Court's 2023 ruling that reaffirmed the right of LGBTQ+ associations to register as non-governmental organizations.

==== 2025 ====
- An amendment to the Birth and Death Registration Act is published in the country's Official Gazette recognizing intersex as a third sex option to be included on birth and death certificates.

== See also ==
- LGBTQ rights in Kenya

== Sources ==
- Epprecht, Marc (1998). "Overview". Boy-Wives and Female Husbands. Studies in African Homosexualities. State University of New York Press. pp. 19–40. doi:10.2307/jj.18473015.8. ISBN 978-1-4384-8410-5.
