= Mbithi Masya =

Kenyan filmmaker and writer

- Born: 13 December 1985 (age 40); Nairobi, Kenya
- Education: Strathmore School, Strathmore University
- Occupation: Film Producer
- Notable work: Kati Kati Just a Band
- Website: mbithi.co

Mbithi Masya (born 13 December 1985) is a Kenyan filmmaker, artist and writer from Nairobi, Kenya.

== Career ==
He is part of the experimental collective Just a Band (2008–2016, 2022-present) that became one of Kenya's most famous bands in the 2010s. He is credited for producing, along with fellow band member Jim Chuchu, the iconic video for the song "Hahe", considered Kenya's first viral internet meme showcasing the superhero-inspired character Makmende. Other songs that Masya created videos for include Matatizo.

His first feature film, Kati Kati (2016), won several awards including the International Federation of Film Critics (FIPRESCI) award at the 2016 Toronto Film Festival, and the Best East African Film award at the 2017 Africa Magic Viewers' Choice Awards. The film was submitted to the Academy Awards as Kenya's official submission for a foreign language film. In 2022, he released his short Baba, Winner of the Baobab Award for best short at the Royal African Society's Film Africa festival. The story follows a young boy who develops a unique ability to teleport as a way to cope with the trauma of sexual assault.

Masya is next set to co-direct with Anjali Nayar the film Just a Band, a fictionalized documentary. As of October 2024, the film is in the development stage.

Along with Sheba Hirst, Masya is the co-founder of the Nairobi Film Festival. In an interview, Hirst explained that the origins of the festival came about with Masya's realization that there wasn't a local film event at which to premiere his film, Kati Kati.

She won the Kalasha Awards for best director in 2017 with Kati Kati.
