= 82 (album) =

Studio album by Just a Band
- Released: October 2, 2009 (Kenya)
- Recorded: 2008–2009
- Genre: House, disco, hip hop, electronica
- Length: 55:59
- Producer: Just a Band

Just a Band chronology
Scratch to Reveal (2008)	82 (2009)	Sorry for the Delay (2012)

82 is the second studio album by the Kenyan house/funk trio Just a Band, released in 2009 following their debut release Scratch to Reveal. Just A Band signed a US licensing deal with Akwaaba Music, who re-released 82 on February 23, 2010.

== Album information ==
Just a Band released the music video for the first single from the album, "Usinibore" on July 4, 2009. The video – created by the band themselves – helped land the single in the We Are Hunted charts, peaking at number three on November 11, 2009.

82 was released on October 2, 2009, at a pre-launch release party. Compared with the trio's previous release, Scratch to Reveal, 82 is 12 minutes, 9 seconds longer and contains 13 tracks and 1 hidden track. The playlist features fewer guest artists (Bien Baraza, Juliani and Wambura Mitaru), and the trio have undertaken greater singing roles themselves.

=== Ha-He ===
The band released the video for their second single from the album "Ha-He" on Wednesday 17 March 2010. The video is a spoof of blaxploitation films, featuring a protagonist named "Makmende". The video subsequently became popular, and has been described as "Kenya’s first viral internet meme". The band were featured on CNN, The Wall Street Journal and Fast Company as a result.

== Reception ==
Reviews for the album were strongly positive; Exclaim! described it as resplendent in its cool tones and chilled vocals and very distinctive, regardless of its origin, and The Huffington Post described the album as the sign of a generational shift.

== Track listing ==
No.	Title	Length
1.	"Save My Soul"	3:41
2.	"Ha-He"	3:56
3.	"Extra"	4:08
4.	"Kaa Ridho"	3:52
5.	"Migingo Express"	3:32
6.	"Usinibore"	4:12
7.	"Sunrise"	4:52
8.	"Huff + Puff"	3:55
9.	"Uko Mbele"	4:37
10.	"Forever People"	4:41
11.	"Stay"	3:40
12.	"BoogieDeeBweet"	4:16
13.	"Tingiza Kichwa/Where Do You Come From" (hidden)	6:39

== Personnel ==
=== Just a Band ===
Just a Band	Vocals, Instrumentation
Juliani	Vocals
Wambura Mitaru	Vocals
Bien Baraza	Vocals
Njoki Ngumi	Vocals
Tina Nduba	Vocals

=== Production ===
Executive producers	Just a Band
Mixing	Just A Band, Eric Musyoka
Instrumentation	Just A Band, David Gitoho, Eric Musyoka
Album Art/Package Design	Jim Chuchu
