= The Nest Collective =

Kenyan artist collective

The Nest Collective is a Kenyan artist collective. They are best known for their work in film and television, including the film Stories of Our Lives and the web series Tuko Macho, and are also involved in fashion, visual arts and music projects.

The collective first became widely known in 2014 when Stories of Our Lives, an anthology of five short films dramatizing true stories of LGBT life in Kenya, premiered at the 2014 Toronto International Film Festival. The film originally ran without individual credits due to the collective's concerns about the film's reception in Kenya, where homosexuality is illegal. Following the premiere, Nest Collective members Jim Chuchu, George Gachara and Njoki Ngumi opted to reveal their names at the screening and in an interview with Toronto's LGBT newspaper Xtra!. The film was rejected for distribution and screening in Kenya by the Kenya Film Classification Board, on the grounds that the film "promotes homosexuality, which is contrary to national norms and values" of Kenya. Gachara, as executive producer of the film, was subsequently arrested on charges of violating the country's Films and Stage Plays Act by purportedly shooting the film without a license from the Kenyan Department of Film Services. The charges against Gachara were dropped by March 2015, although the film itself has remained banned in Kenya.

Other members of the collective include Dr. Akati Khasiani, Njeri Gitungo, Kendi Kamwambia, Sunny Dolat, Noel Kasyoka, Mars, Olivia Ambani, Hope Bii and Wakiuru Njuguna.

In 2017 the collective published the book Not African Enough, an anthology of essays and photography about African fashion, and released the virtual reality film project Let This Be a Warning.
