= Kati Kati =

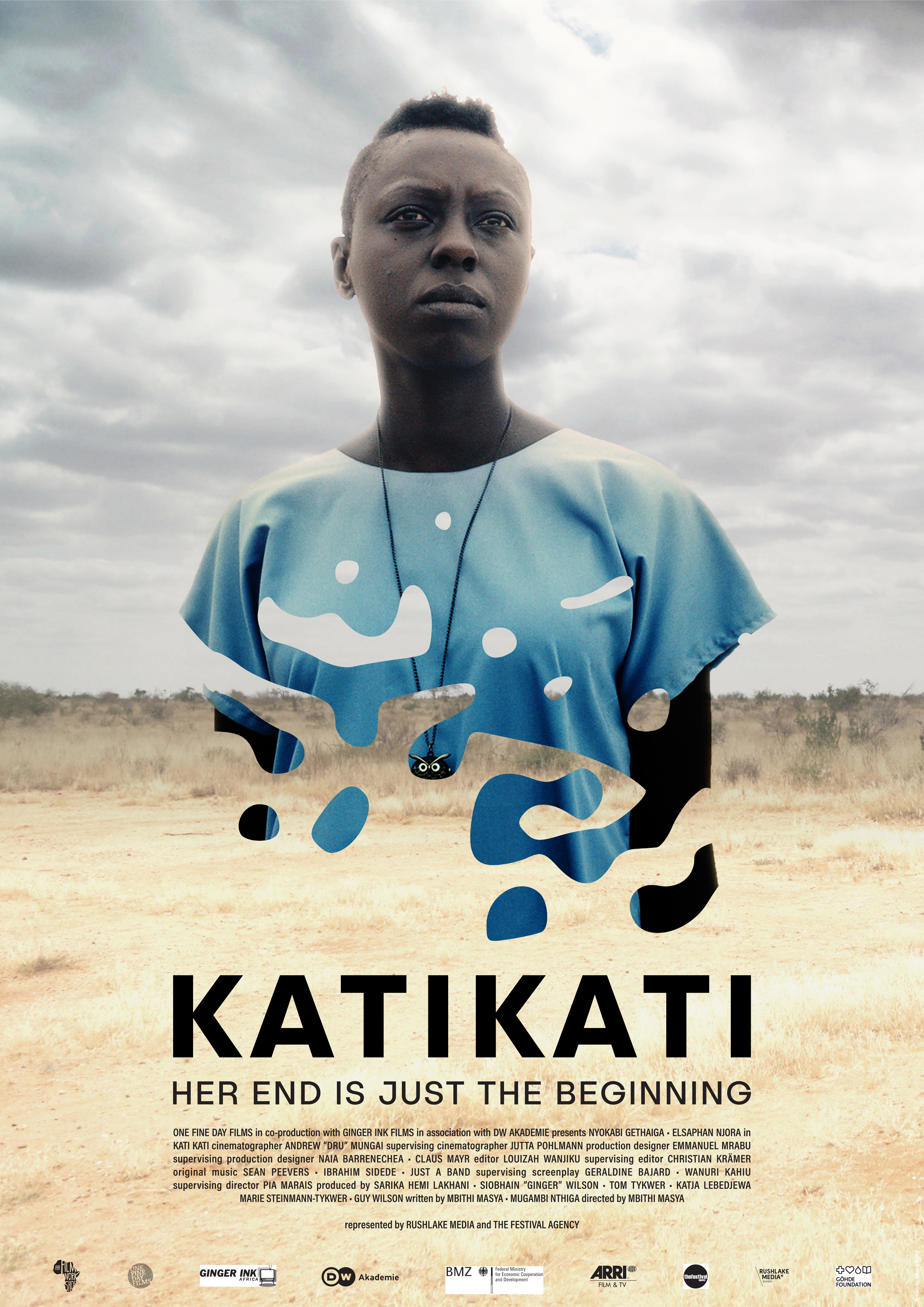
- Film poster
- Directed by: Mbithi Masya
- Written by: Mbithi Masya; Mugambi Nthiga
- Produced by: Sarika Hemi Lakhani; Siobhain 'Ginger' Wilson; Katja Lebedjewa; Marie Steinmann-Tykwer; Guy Wilson
- Starring: Nyokabi Gethaiga; Elsaphan Njora
- Edited by: Louizah Wanjiku
- Music by: Sean Peevers; Ibrahim Sidede; Just a Band
- Release date: 10 September 2016 (TIFF)
- Running time: 75 minutes
- Countries: Kenya; Germany
- Languages: Swahili; English

Kati Kati is a 2016 Kenyan drama film directed by Mbithi Masya. Kati Kati is a co-production of One Fine Day Films and Ginger Ink. At the 2016 Toronto International Film Festival, Kati Kati won the Prize of the International Federation of Film Critics (FIPRESCI) for the Discovery programme. It was selected as the Kenyan entry for the Best Foreign Language Film at the 90th Academy Awards, but it was not nominated.

== Plot ==
Without any recollection of what happened before, young Kaleche finds herself in the middle of the wilderness. She makes her way to Kati Kati, a nearby lodge, where she meets a motley crew of residents under the leadership of Thoma. They inform her that she is dead and won’t be able to leave Kati Kati. She quickly assimilates into the group and together they enjoy Kati Kati’s luxurious distractions. Kaleche soon realizes that afterlife is not only fun and games, every member of the group seems to still carry a burden from their previous life. Mikey, a recent graduate and basketball enthusiast with a history of self-harm, is struggling with leaving his mother behind. When he is finally capable of letting her go, Mikey transitions out of his existence at the lodge. Kaleche becomes curious about the now apparent possibility of transition. She questions the reclusive painter King, formerly a priest who died in a post election violence revenge attack. Kaleche learns about a strange condition which renders the lodges residents flesh cold, white and lifeless.

When Kaleche reveals to Toma that her skin has begun to whiten, Thoma confronts King, blaming him for Kaleche’s condition and revealing that King was killed in a revenge attack because he let his own parishioners burn to death outside his church. Later that night, Kaleche finds King, outside his cottage, burning his possessions, his skin white from head to toe and his eyes blackened. To Kaleche’s horror and surprise, King walks straight out into the darkened nowhere, no longer bound by Kati Kati.

Since Kaleche’s arrival, affections between her and Thoma had been growing daily, but when both share an intimate moment it comes to an abrupt end. During a group session, Grace reveals to Kaleche that Thoma has known all along who she is, as they were married in their previous lives. Kaleche confronts Thoma who reveals that his drinking led to a fatal car crash. The rest of the residents are taken back by Thoma’s revelation and believe that he has been holding all of them back. Dragged through the place by the angry mob, Thoma begins to settle with his fate, believing that he is beyond redemption. Kaleche breaks through the mob, and embraces Thoma. An unspoken act of forgiveness allows Thoma to find peace and transition.

== Background ==
Following the success of feature film Soul Boy, One Fine Day Films and Kenyan-based production company Ginger Ink partnered with DW Akademie to design a two-module training initiative: One Fine Day Film Workshops. The first module, a classroom-like "mini film school", deepens and expands the skill set and cinematic language of already practicing African filmmakers. It widens cinematic perspectives, exposure and vocabulary. Treasuring African Stories and wanting to enable talented filmmakers from the continent to reach a larger number of viewers is what One Fine Day Films are working for. In 2012, the second feature film to come out of the One Fine Day Film Workshops, Nairobi Half Life by Tosh Gitonga, was the first ever Kenyan entry to the Oscars. Mbithi Masya from Kenya, former student of the class of 2010, was selected to co-write and direct the next movie – soon KATI KATI was born. Andrew Mungai, also a graduate of the One Fine Day Film Workshops was chosen as the cinematographer and many more crew members could be recruited out of the many trained departments. In cooperation with the Goehde Foundation, One Fine Day Films developed a Film Music Workshop out of which the music for KATI KATI was composed. The Kenyan composers where then invited to Cologne to rehearse the music together with the Jungle Orchester NRW.

== Awards and accolades ==
At the 2016 Toronto International Film Festival, Kati Kati won the Prize of the International Federation of Film Critics (FIPRESCI) for the Discovery programme. Kati Kati also received the New Voices/New Visions Award Special Mention at the 2017 Palm Springs International Festival and The Filmpris (Film Prize) at the 19th CinemAfrica Film Festival in Stockholm, Sweden. The director, Mbithi Masya was also awarded The Emerging Filmmaker Award at the 2017 Minneapolis St. Paul International Film Festival.

Kati Kati led the nomination slate for the 2017 Kalasha awards with a total of 13 nominations, among them best actor and best actress in a movie. The film won a Kalasha award for best special effect and a Kalasha Award for Best Feature Film.

== Cast ==
- Kaleche: Nyokabi Gethaiga
- Thoma: Elsaphan Njora
- Mikey: Paul Ogola
- King: Peter Nzioki
- Grace: Fidelis Nyambura Mukundi
- Anto: Brian Ogola
- Jojo: Mumbi Maina
- Brenda: Jane Muriki
- Bill: Samson Hassan
- Timo: Mugambi Nthiga
- Mikey's Mom: Mary Gacheri
- Guest 1: Paul Muye
- Guest 2: Samuel Masha
- Guest 3: Juma Kahindi
- Doppelgänger: Joseph 'Kashata' Mburu
- Choir Conductor: Samuel Kiarie

== See also ==
- List of submissions to the 90th Academy Awards for Best Foreign Language Film
- List of Kenyan submissions for the Academy Award for Best Foreign Language Film
