= Tuko Macho =

- Created by: Jim Chuchu
- Starring: Kelly Gichohi; Ian Thiong’o; Timothy King’oo; Lowry Odhiambo; Paul Ogola; Millicent Ogutu; Njambi Koikai; Ibrahim Muchemi; Joseph Marwa; Veronica Waceke
- Country of origin: Kenya

Production
- Production location: Nairobi
- Production company: The Nest Collective

Original release
- Release: October 2016

Tuko Macho is a Kenyan web series, which premiered in 2016. A dramatization of Kenya's issues with crime and vigilante justice, the series centres on a vigilante gang who kidnap criminals in Nairobi, and asks viewers to vote on their execution or release.

The series was created by Jim Chuchu in conjunction with The Nest Collective, a Nairobi-based arts collective previously known for the LGBT-related film Stories of Our Lives. The cast includes Kelly Gichohi, Ian Thiong’o, Timothy King’oo, Lowry Odhiambo, Paul Ogola, Millicent Ogutu, Njambi Koikai and Ibrahim Muchemi.

The dialogue is primarily in Sheng, an urban dialect of Swahili.

The first two episodes of the series had an advance screening in the Primetime program at the 2016 Toronto International Film Festival.
