= Blinky Bill (musician) =

Kenyan musician/producer

Bill Sellanga, known by his stage name Blinky Bill, is a Kenyan musician/producer and DJ based in Nairobi. He is also a founder of the Kenyan art and music collective Just A Band.

Blinky Bill chose his stage name after seeing his name in a newspaper and thinking that it looked too boring. The name was inspired by the Australian cartoon of the same name, which was also his nickname in high school.

== Music career ==
When Blinky Bill studied at Kenyatta University, he met Daniel Muli and Jim Chuchu and formed the alternative art and music collective Just A Band. Their debut album, Scratch to Reveal, was released in 2008. In 2010, the music video for their hit single Ha-He became widely described as Kenya's first viral video.

In 2018, Blinky Bill released his first solo studio album, Everyone's Just Winging It And Other Fly Tales. One of the album tracks, Feeling It, appeared on the original motion picture soundtrack of the 2018 film Rafiki. The album followed the EP We Cut Keys While You Wait from 2016.

Emirates partnered with Blinky Bill in 2019 to create a "pan-African anthem" celebrating the talent and achievements of young Africans. It was part of Emirates' "New Africa" campaign. The campaign described Sellanga as the "embodiment of a renaissance in African music".

Blinky Bill is a TED fellow and was named to the Yerba Buena Centre of the Arts' 2018 YBCA 100 list of people shifting culture and creating change.

== Discography ==
=== Studio albums ===
==== Solo ====
- Everyone's Just Winging It And Other Fly Tales (2018)
- We Cut Keys 2 (2024)

==== Just A Band ====
- Scratch To Reveal (2008)
- 82 (2009)
- Sorry for the Delay (2012)

=== EPs ===
==== Solo ====
- We Cut Keys While You Wait (2016)

==== Just A Band ====
- The Light Fantastic EP (2006)
- BLNRB (2010)
