= LGBTQ rights in Kenya =

- Kenya
- Legal status: Illegal since 1897 (as East Africa Protectorate)
- Penalty: 14 to 21 years imprisonment with fines (repeal proposed)
- Gender identity: Intersex only (Pending Transgender Protection Rights Act)
- Military: No
- Discrimination protections: Limited protections

Family rights
- Recognition of relationships: No recognition of same-sex unions
- Restrictions: Same-sex marriage constitutionally banned since 2010
- Adoption: No

Lesbian, gay, bisexual, transgender and queer (LGBTQ) people in Kenya face significant challenges not experienced by non-LGBTQ residents. Sodomy is a felony per Section 162 of the Kenyan Penal Code, punishable by 21 years' imprisonment, and any sexual practices (termed "gross indecency") are a felony under Section 165 of the same statute, punishable by five years' imprisonment. On 24 May 2019, the High Court of Kenya refused an order to declare sections 162 and 165 unconstitutional. The state does not recognise any relationships between persons of the same sex; same-sex marriage is banned under the Kenyan Constitution since 2010. There are no explicit protections against discrimination on the basis of sexual orientation and gender identity. Adoption is restricted to heterosexual couples only.

Transgender people have historically suffered discrimination, and there are no statutory provisions relating to transgender rights. However, a landmark ruling by the High Court of Kenya in August 2025 found in favor of transgender rights, ruling that violations of certain rights of a specific transgender person, "including freedom from torture and cruel, inhuman or degrading treatment, equality and non-discrimination, dignity, freedom and security of the person, and privacy were unconstitutional." The court ordered the national parliament to implement "the enactment of the Transgender Protection Rights Act, or, in the alternative, the amendments of the Intersex Persons Bill 2024".

Kenyan society is highly conservative, and a large majority of people hold negative views of LGBT people. In 2023, Pew Research Center estimated that over 90% of Kenyans oppose same-sex marriage. Nevertheless, public support has slowly been growing and various organizations are working to protect and improve LGBTQ rights.

== Laws about same-sex sexual activity ==
=== Statutes ===
Expressions of homosexuality are illegal under Kenyan statutes and carry a maximum penalty of 14 years' imprisonment, or 21 years under certain aggravating circumstances. Sex acts between women are mentioned under the gender-neutral term "person" in Section 162 of the Penal Code and are enforced equally. On 28 November 2010, Prime Minister Raila Odinga called for women or men engaging in same-sex activity to be arrested.

The Kenyan Penal Code of 1930, as revised in 2006, provides as follows:

- Section 162. Unnatural offenses.

Any person who –

(a) has carnal knowledge of any person against the order of nature; or
(c) permits a male person to have carnal knowledge of him or her against the order of nature, is guilty of a felony and is liable to imprisonment for fourteen years:

Provided that, in the case of an offence under paragraph (a), the offender shall be liable to imprisonment for twenty-one years if –

(i) the offence was committed without the consent of the person who was carnally known; or
(ii) the offence was committed with that person's consent but the consent was obtained by force or by means of threats or intimidation of some kind, or by fear of bodily harm, or by means of false representations as to the nature of the act.

- Section 163. Attempt to commit unnatural offenses.

Any person who attempts to commit any of the offences specified in section 162 is guilty of a felony and is liable to imprisonment for seven years.

- Section 165. Indecent practices between males.

Any male person who, whether in public or private, commits any act of gross indecency with another male person, or procures another male person to commit any act of gross indecency with him, or attempts to procure the commission of any such act by any male person with himself or with another male person, whether in public or private, is guilty of a felony and is liable to imprisonment for five years.

The Kenya Human Rights Commission reported in 2011 about how these statutes have indirect but very adverse effects on LGBTI persons, saying,

Same sex sexual practices remain criminalized ... and even though there are few convictions based on sections 162 to 165 of the Penal Code ..., LGBTI persons are routinely harassed by the police, held in remand houses beyond the constitutional period without charges being preferred against them, and presented in court on trumped-up charges. Closely related to this, is a cartel of corrupt police officials who routinely extort and blackmail LGBTI persons with the threat of arrest and imprisonment if they do not give those bribes. ... LGBTI sex workers, mostly MSMs [men who have sex with men] are often asked for bribes and sexual favours by male police officers in exchange for their freedom and security. ... Those who fail to give bribes or sexual favours are charged with tramped up charges and sometimes raped by state security officers.

In a 2020–2021 report, the Nairobi-based National Gay and Lesbian Human Rights Commission reported incidents of police demanding bribes.

=== Constitutional provisions ===
The Constitution of Kenya, which took effect 27 August 2010, does not expressly protect the rights of LGBTI persons because, according to the experts who drafted the constitution, a majority of Kenyans would have rejected the constitution in the referendum to adopt it.

Nevertheless, few argue that Kenya's statutes discriminating against LGBTI persons are unconstitutional and void because of the constitution's broad protection of civil and human rights. Peter Anaminyi, the national director of Feba Radio Kenya, predicted in June 2011 that within 18 months there would be a challenge to the constitutionality of the Kenya Penal Code.

==== Article 2 ====
Article 2 of the Constitution of Kenya provides, in paragraph (5) that "the general rules of international law shall form part of the law of Kenya" and, in paragraph (6), that "[a]ny treaty or convention ratified by Kenya shall form part of the law of Kenya under this Constitution". In paragraph (4), the constitution states, "[a]ny law, including customary law, that is inconsistent with [the] Constitution is void to the extent of the inconsistency, and any act or omission in contravention of [the] Constitution is invalid." A subsequent section of this article lists Kenya's obligations under international law and treaties concerning LGBTI rights. To the extent that any Kenyan law violates Kenya's voluntary or involuntary obligations under international law, the law is arguably void under Article 2.

==== Article 10 ====
Article 10(2)(b) of the Constitution of Kenya provides that, "The national values and principles of governance include ... human dignity, equity, social justice, inclusiveness, equality, human rights, non-discrimination and protection of the marginalised...." Concerning this provision, "Right there, there is a firm basis [for] one to argue against the violation of their [LGBTI persons'] dignity ... on the basis of their gender or sexual orientation. There is firm ground to contest for inclusion, non-discrimination and equality too".

==== Article 19 ====
Article 19 of the Constitution of Kenya provides that,

(1) The Bill of Rights [Articles 19-59] is an integral part of Kenya's democratic state and is the framework for social, economic and cultural policies.

(2) The purpose of recognizing and protecting human rights and fundamental freedoms is to preserve the dignity of individuals and communities and to promote social justice and the realization of the potential of all human beings.

==== Article 20 ====
Article 20(3)(b) of the Constitution of Kenya requires courts, when applying a provision of the Bill of Rights, to "adopt the legal interpretation that most favours the enforcement of a right or fundamental freedom". Concerning this article, Makau Mutua, the chair of the Kenya Human Rights Commission and the dean at the University at Buffalo Law School, The State University of New York, says that "where a right is contested, the courts must take the most liberal interpretation of the law to avoid denying the right".

==== Article 24 ====
Article 24(1) of the Constitution of Kenya provides that, "A right or fundamental freedom in the Bill of Rights shall not be limited except by law, and then only to the extent that the limitation is reasonable and justifiable in an open and democratic society based on human dignity, equality and freedom, taking into account all relevant factors...."

==== Article 27 ====
Article 27 of the Constitution of Kenya provides that,

1. Every person is equal before the law and has the right to equal protection and equal benefit of the law.
2. Equality includes the full and equal enjoyment of all rights and fundamental freedoms.
3. Women and men have the right to equal treatment, including the right to equal opportunities in political, economic, cultural and social spheres.
4. The State shall not discriminate directly or indirectly against any person on any ground, including race, sex, pregnancy, marital status, health status, ethnic or social origin, colour, age, disability, religion, conscience, belief, culture, dress, language or birth.
5. A person shall not discriminate directly or indirectly against another person on any of the grounds specified or contemplated in clause (4).

Concerning this article, The Equal Rights Trust and the non-governmental Kenya Human Rights Commission said in 2012,

While the Constitution does not explicitly provide for non-discrimination on grounds of sexual orientation and gender identity, there is scope for this to be rectified through the courts or subsequent legislation. Article 27(4) of the Constitution of Kenya 2010 provides that the "state shall not discriminate directly or indirectly on any ground, including [listed characteristics]", while Article 27(5) states that persons shall not discriminate on any of the grounds "specified or contemplated in clause (4)". Thus defined, the prohibition on discrimination by both the state and non-state actors should be read as inclusive of sexual orientation and gender identity.

In a May 2012 submission to the United Nations Human Rights Committee, the government of Kenya agreed with this interpretation of Article 27(4).

Makau Mutua argues that the Kenya Penal Code is unconstitutional under this article. He said,

Article 27, which is the Equal Protection of the Constitution, provides "every person" is "equal before the law" and has the "right to equal protection" before the law. That's an unequivocal, categorical, and blanket protection against discrimination. The article doesn't exclude homosexuals from the ambit of constitutional protection. Further, Article 27(4) prohibits discrimination on the grounds of "sex". The prohibition of discrimination on the grounds of sex has been understood to include sexual orientation. The Constitution eliminates all wiggle room by prohibiting both direct and indirect discrimination.

==== Article 28 ====
Article 28 of the Constitution of Kenya provides that, "Every person has inherent dignity and the right to have that dignity respected and protected." This article offers "fresh impetus to the rights of the LGBTI community".

==== Article 31 ====
Article 31 of the Constitution of Kenya provides that, "Every person has the right to privacy...." Privacy is a fundamental human right, enshrined in numerous international human rights instruments.

=== Decriminalization efforts ===
In 2013, the Cosmopolitan Affirming Church (CAC) opened in Nairobi, becoming the first openly LGBTQ church in the country. The church is considered to be a rare space where Kenya's LGBTQ community can escape hostility from society. In 2016, The Employment and Relations Court in the Kenyan town of Nyeri ordered the Anglican Church of Kenya to reinstate three priests who were suspended in 2015 after allegations surfaced that they were gay. The priests later sued Bishop Joseph Kagunda of the Mount Kenya West Diocese, and it was later agreed that they would settle the lawsuit through mediation. In December 2018, it was announced that the Anglican Church in Kenya had given each of the three priests individual compensations of KSh.6.8 million/=.

The High Court of Kenya heard a legal challenge against on 22 and 23 February 2018, filed by the Kenyan National Gay and Lesbian Rights Commission (NGLHRC) will argue that sections of the Kenyan Penal Code are in breach of the Constitution and deny basic rights to Kenyan citizens. The case, Eric Gitari v Attorney General & another (Petition no. 150 of 2016) filed in 2016, seeks to strike down sections Section 162 (a) and (c) and section 165 of the Penal Code (Cap 63) that criminalise consensual same sex relations between adults. Eric Gitari, executive director of NGLHRC—and the main petitioner—states that sections of the Penal Code are used to justify violence against LGBTQ persons in Kenya. The constitutional division of Kenya's High Court will hear submissions from both parties on 25 October on the relevance of the decision by the Supreme Court of India to legalise gay sex by overturning Section 377 to Kenya, given that both countries have shared the law—dating back to the days of British colonial rule—that criminalises "sexual acts against the order of nature". The High Court was expected to announce its ruling on 22 February 2019. On the scheduled date, however, it was announced that the ruling would be delayed until 24 May 2019. On 24 May 2019, the High Court of Kenya refused an order to declare sections 162 and 165 unconstitutional. LGBTQ activists vowed to file an appeal in the Court of Appeal. On February 4, 2026, the Court of Appeal in Nairobi scheduled a full-day hearing for this case in May 2026, however, as of now, the decision remains pending.

In a separate case, a Court of Appeal in Mombasa, Kenya, ruled on 22 March 2018, that conducting forced anal examinations on people who are accused of same-sex relations is unconstitutional. The ruling reversed a 2016 High Court decision that had upheld the Kenyan authorities' use of forced anal exams to attempt to provide evidence of homosexual conduct. The National Gay and Lesbian Human Rights Commission (NGLHRC), a nongovernmental organization based in Nairobi, filed a constitutional challenge after police arrested two men in Kwale County in February 2015 on charges of homosexuality, and subjected them to forced anal exams, HIV tests, and hepatitis B tests at Mombasa's Madaraka Hospital. Following this decision, Empowering Marginalized Communities (EMAC), a non governmental organization based in Machakos county prosecuted a case that involved two members of the LGBTQ community who were allegedly caught having sex in Kakuyuni area of Kangundo sub-county. The two men were taken for anal examination at the Kangundo Level 4 hospital. This was contested at the magistrate court of Kangundo and thus the anal examination was halted.

== Pending bill to punish homosexuality with death ==
Inspired by the Anti-Homosexuality Act of Uganda, a "similarly formulated bill" called the Family Protection Bill was introduced to the National Assembly in 2023. The bill, written and introduced by Parliament member George Peter Opondo Kaluma, allows "aggravated homosexuality" to be punished with death and would criminalize all promotion of LGBTQ+ activity.

The Bill would restrict the rights for LGBTQ+ people, such as privacy, assembly and public demonstration, and also prohibit pride parades. Additionally it includes provisions for monitoring private and public spaces, removing topics related to LGBTQ+ issues from school curricula and seeks to overturn a 2023 Supreme Court decision that affirmed the LGBTQ+ community's right to form associations.

The proposal, under file reference DLS/NA/BILLS/2/18/2023, is currently before the Committee on Social Protection for pre-publication scrutiny, a stage it has been in for close to two years hence stalling its progression to the next steps.

== Recognition of same-sex unions ==
Article 45(2) of the Constitution of Kenya specifically authorises heterosexual marriage but makes no reference to same-sex marriage; "Every adult has the right to marry a person of the opposite sex, based on the free consent of the parties".

Although same-sex marriage is not legally recognized in Kenya, other forms of societal and symbolic recognition do take place—such as weddings in LGBTQ inclusive churches or through the payment of dowry. These practices may not be common or widespread, but they have been documented in ethnographic studies and hold deep meaning for those involved in these unions.

In October 2009, two Kenyan men, Charles Ngengi and Daniel Chege, became civil partners at a ceremony in London, United Kingdom. The ceremony received widespread attention in Kenya, most of it critical. Chege's relatives were harassed severely by people living in his home village of Gathiru in Murang'a District.

=== False rumor about impending same-sex marriage in Mtwapa ===
In February 2010, a rumor spread in the coastal town of Mtwapa that two Kenyan men were going to marry in a local hotel. The rumor unleashed a "house-to-house witch hunt by anti-gay vigilantes, street attacks targeting gay men, the sacking of an AIDS-fighting medical center, and a widening wave of ultra-homophobic national media coverage". A local radio station, Kaya FM, picked up the story and started a series of programs on gays, which "included phone-in talk shows filled with homophobic discourse and incitements to violence". Baraka FM, Rahma FM, and ultimately national radio stations including Kiss and Classic FM also ran the story. Five days before the date of the non-existent wedding, "many of the muftis and imams discussed the impending wedding during Friday prayers and asked the community to be vigilant against homosexuals. They told their congregants to demonstrate and to flush out homosexuals from the midst of Mtwapa and to ensure that no gay wedding took place".

The day before the non-existent wedding, a press conference condemning the wedding was held by Sheikh Ali Hussein, regional coordinator of the Council of Imams and Preachers of Kenya, together with Bishop Lawrence Chai, regional representative of the National Council of Churches of Kenya. They warned that "God is about to punish the fastest-growing town in the Coast region. Come night, come day, we shall not allow that marriage to be conducted in this town tomorrow. We shall stand firm to flush out gays who throng this town every weekend from all corners of this country".

They also warned the owner of a building in the town, who was allegedly renting rooms only to homosexuals, to evict them within seven days or face their wrath. The two denounced the Mtwapa clinic run by the Kenya Medical Research Institute, which has an AIDS program for counseling and treating men who have sex with men. "We ask that the government shut it down with immediate effect or we will descend on its officials". A former member of Kenya's parliament, Omar Masumbuko, addressed the mob gathered outside the police station. He said that "homosexuality must be stopped and every means used to make that happen". He told the crowd "they should not even bother to bring the homosexuals they find to the police station but should take care of the issue themselves".

=== Traditional female same-sex marriage ===
Female same-sex marriage is practiced among the Gikuyu, Nandi, Kamba, Kipsigis, and to a lesser extent neighboring peoples. Approximately 5–10% of women in these nations are in such marriages. However, this is not seen as (homo)sexual, but is instead a way for families without sons to keep their inheritance within the family. The couples are considered married, though the terms used for them are mother-in-law and daughter-in-law. The female "husband" (the "mother-in-law") carries on the family name and property, while the female "wife" (the "daughter-in-law") bears children, with the intention of having a son. The female "husband" may be widowed, but may also have a living male husband, but he will not be the father of the female "wife's" children, and the identity of the biological father, though often kin, is kept secret. Such marriages may be polygamous; in 2010 a woman was interviewed who had taken five wives.

== Adoption and family planning ==
The Children Act, 2001 makes homosexuals and unmarried couples ineligible to adopt children. Even if that ineligibility does not apply specifically, "a court may refuse to make an adoption order in respect of any person or persons if it is satisfied for any reason that it would not be in the best interests of the welfare of the child to do so".

== Gender identity and expression ==
With respect to transgender persons, there is no legal means to change your gender in Kenya. The governmental Kenya National Commission on Human Rights reported in April 2012 that the transgender community face much discrimination in the country:

[T]ransgender people in Kenya suffer stigma and discrimination and are not able to access gender re-assignment therapy. A witness who testified at the Inquiry indicated that she had undergone all the processes of re-assignment but Kenyatta National Hospital declined the surgery and did not offer any reasons for declining. Her attempts to appeal to the Kenya Medical Practitioners and Dentist's Board have not been successful. Without being allowed to complete the therapy, transgender people suffer identity problems since they are biologically either male or female, yet they present themselves in one of the gender by mode of dressing, personality expressions or through other socially defined roles. When arrested, police often face difficulties regarding what cells (male or female) to detain transgender individuals. When at entertainment areas, they are afraid of using bathrooms designated for either sex for fear of being caught by other people and accused or mistaken to be using bathrooms for sexual crimes. The witness testified that sometimes they meet opposite sex partners who demand to have sexual relationships with them. When they discover that they are not female or male (depending on the gender of the sex partner), they scream and attract members of public to the hotel room causing public nuisance, stigma and embarrassment to the transgender person.

Transgender people face stigma, discrimination, and violence in Kenya. Discrimination in particular is prevalent, as is sexual violence. This is in the areas of recognition of a third sex by the government, access to justice, employment and other spheres of public life.

Transgender Education and Advocacy (TEA) is "a human rights organisation working towards ending human rights violations against transgender / transsexual people. Established in December 2008, the TEA aims to change the public mentality towards transgender / transsexual people through awareness raising campaigns, advocating for legal and policy reforms[,] and empowering transgender / transsexual people".

On May 20, 2026, the High Court of Kenya ruled that Kenyans must be allowed to change gender markers on their identification documents. The ruling was in response to a lawsuit filed in 2020 by transgender activist Audrey Mbugua and two other individuals seeking to amend their birth certificates.

== Intersex rights ==
Intersex people face stigma, discrimination, and violence in Kenya, including mutilation and non-consensual medical interventions, and difficulties in obtaining documentation.

== International pressure ==
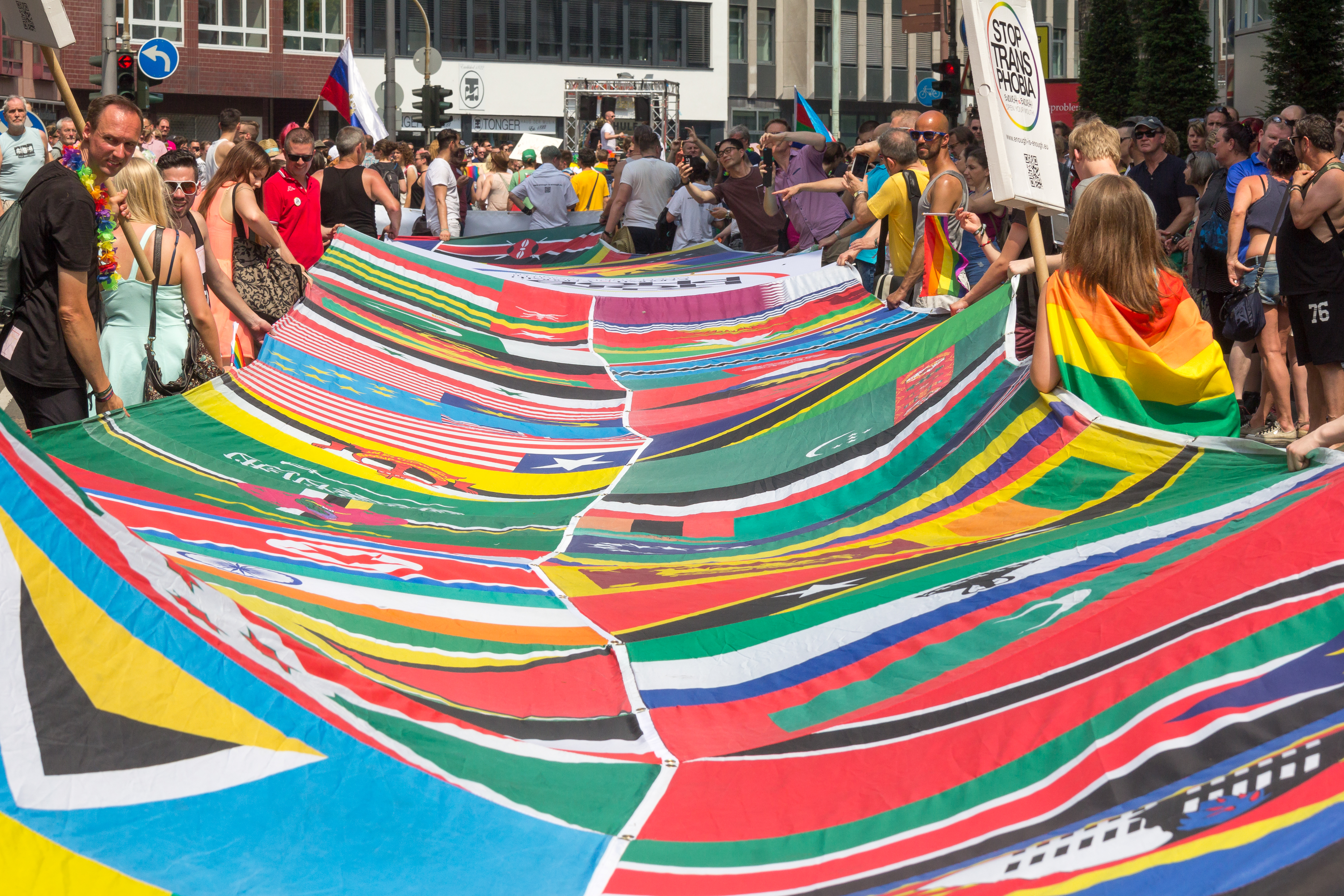
LGBT activists at Cologne Pride carrying a banner with the flags of 72 countries where homosexuality is illegal

=== Reports and recommendations under the International Covenant on Civil and Political Rights ===
Kenya became a party to the International Covenant on Civil and Political Rights on 1 May 1972. Under Article 40 of the Covenant, the United Nations Human Rights Committee (UNHRC) reviewed and made recommendations on 24 March 2005 concerning Kenya's 18-years-late second periodic report. The UNHRC urged Kenya to repeal Section 162, Penal Code, which criminalises homosexuality. On 19 August 2010 in its third periodic report, Kenya responded formally to this recommendation:

Kenya may not decriminalize same sex unions at this stage as such acts are considered as taboo and offences against the order of nature which are repugnant to cultural values and morality. Indeed the public gave overwhelming presentations to the Committee of Experts [on Constitutional Review] against the inclusion of same sex rights under the new constitution. It must however be reiterated that the government does not discriminate against anyone in the provision of services. No one is ever required under the law to declare their sexual orientation under any circumstances.

Kenya further addressed these issues in May 2012:

Kenya is currently not undertaking any measures to decriminalize same sex unions. Public opinion is strongly against the legalization of same sex unions. The Constitution provides under article 45 (2) that a person has the right to marry a person of the opposite sex, based on the free consent of both parties. However, under article 27 (4), the Constitution, the grounds prohibited for non-discrimination are not limited and therefore this allows room for individuals to claim the violation of their rights on the grounds of their sexual orientation, in the event that they are discriminated against either directly or indirectly by the State or other individuals. ... Until such time that public opinion will change, the Government has tried to accord certain protections to lesbian, gay, bisexual and transgender ... persons.

=== Universal Periodic Reviews ===
The United Nations Human Rights Committee (UNHRC) in May 2010 completed a Universal Periodic Review of the human rights situation in Kenya. During the review, Kenya stated:

With regard to same-sex relationships, there had been serious intolerance because of cultural beliefs and overwhelming opposition to the decriminalization of such relationships, as observed during the constitutional review process. However, the Government did not support discrimination in terms of access to services.

The following recommendations were made to Kenya (the country that initiated the recommendation is listed in parentheses):

Take concrete steps to provide for the protection and equal treatment of lesbian, gay, bisexual and transgender persons (Netherlands); decriminalize same-sex activity between consenting adults (Czech Republic); repeal all legislative provisions which criminalize sexual activity between consenting adults (United States of America); decriminalize homosexuality by abrogating the legal provisions currently punishing sexual relations between consenting individuals of the same sex, and subscribe to the December 2008 General Assembly Declaration on sexual orientation and human rights (France)

In response, Kenya indicated on 6 May 2010 that same-sex unions were culturally unacceptable in Kenya. More specifically, Geoffrey Kibara, Secretary, Justice and Constitutional Affairs, Ministry of Justice, National Cohesion and Constitutional Affairs, said on behalf of the Kenyan delegation:

We wish to state as follows. One, there has been a serious intolerance to homosexual relationships in the country because of cultural beliefs. In fact, these relationships are considered taboo in Kenya. The only way we see these being accepted would be over the long term if there are cultural changes. But currently there is serious opposition to decriminalizing same-sex relationships. In fact, during the constitution-making process, public views were received on this and they were overwhelmingly towards continuing the current criminalization of same-sex relationships. But we also want to state that as a government, we do not support discrimination on people who practice same-sex relationships. Discrimination whether in terms of access to services is expressly outlawed, particularly with regard to access to HIV/AIDS prevention and support facilities. The law that is HIV and AIDS Prevention and Control Act of 2006 expressly prohibits any discrimination towards same-sex relationships or people on the basis of their sexual orientation.

=== Pressure from the U.S. Department of State ===
The U.S. Department of State's 2011 human rights report found that "societal discrimination based on sexual orientation was widespread [in 2011] and resulted in loss of employment and educational opportunities. Violence against the LGBT community also occurred, particularly in rural areas and among refugees. [Nongovernmental organisation] groups reported that police intervened to stop attacks but were not generally sympathetic to LGBT individuals or concerns".

On 26 June 2012, the United States embassy in Nairobi held what was believed to be the first ever LGBTQ pride event in Kenya. A public affairs officer at the embassy said, "The U.S. government for its part has made it clear that the advancement of human rights for LGBT people is central to our human rights policies around the world and to the realisation of our foreign policy goals". Similar events were held at other U.S. embassies around the world.

=== 2025 United Nations Human Rights Council Vote on renewal of the mandate of the UN Independent Expert on Sexual Orientation and Gender Identity (SOGI) ===
In a surprising move in July 2025, Kenya under President William Ruto, voted in favor of renewing the mandate of Graeme Reid for three years. In this role, Graeme investigates and documents human rights abuses against LGBTQ+ people and aims to increase dialogue on LGBTQ+ rights.

Kenya and South Africa were the only African countries that voted in favor. The vote drew both praises and criticisms from Kenyans. Through this vote, Kenya upheld its international commitment to keeping LGBTQ+ rights as part of the global human rights discussion despite divided stands over the topic locally.

== Public opinion and living conditions ==
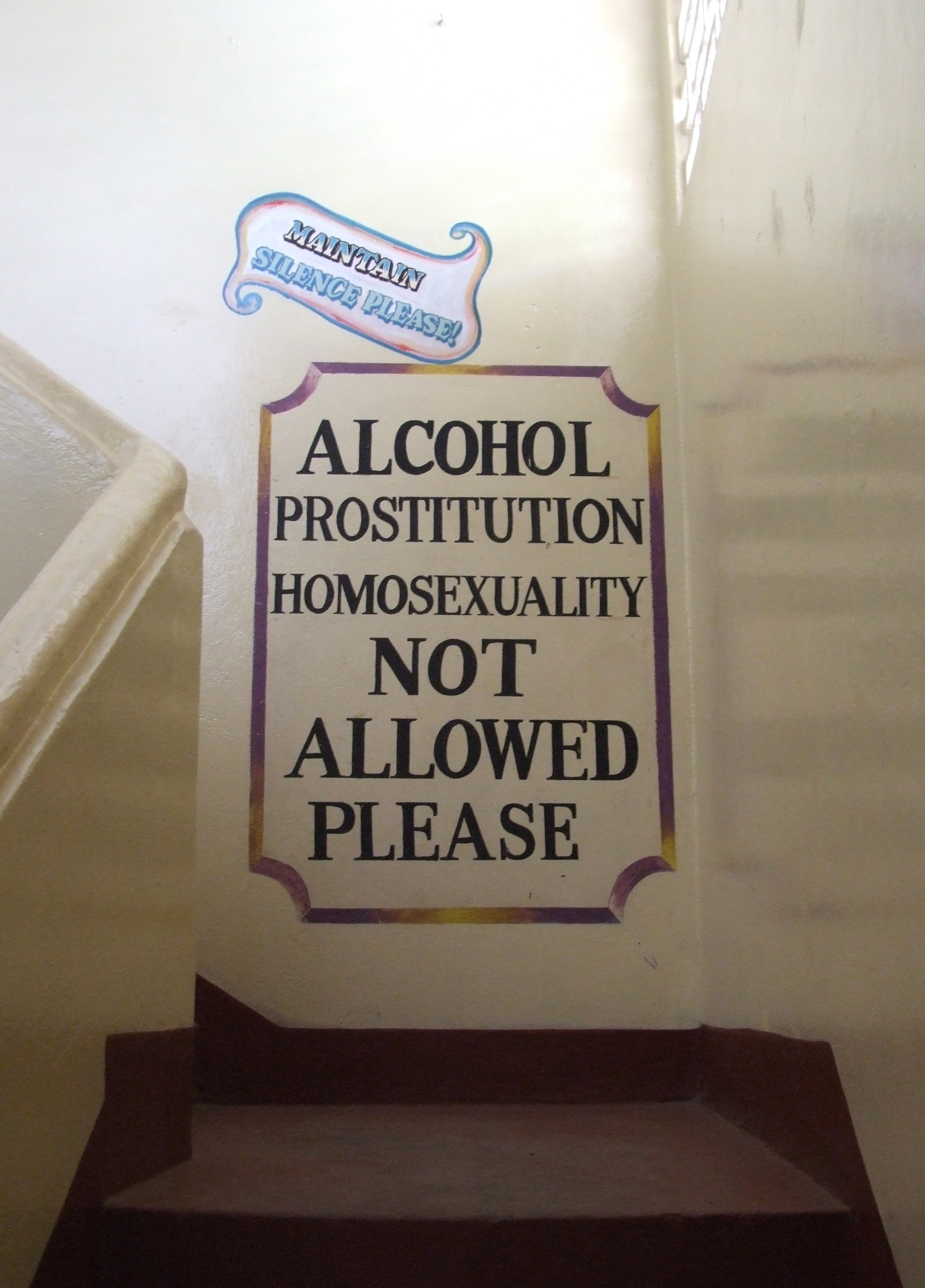
Guest house rules in the predominantly Islamic East Coast

Public opinion on same-sex marriage (2023) based on Pew Research Center
1. Strongly favor (3.00%)
2. Somewhat favor (6.00%)
3. Not sure (1.00%)
4. Somewhat oppose (8.00%)
5. Strongly oppose (82.0%)

According to the 2020 Pew Global Attitudes Project, 14% of Kenyans said homosexuality should be accepted by society up from 1% in 2002. However, a majority (83%) responded that homosexuality should not be accepted by society.

The non-governmental Kenya Human Rights Commission published, in 2011, the first research paper on the legal and social status of LGBTI people in Kenya. Among those who came out or were outed to their family members, 89 percent reported that they were disowned. Employees were reported to have been terminated or subjected to hostility, ridicule, humiliation, and discrimination when their sexual orientation or gender identity became known in the workplace.

Traditional religious and cultural values play a substantial role in this figures. Leaders within the three dominate religions in Kenya, Catholic, Anglican and Islamic, condemn homosexuality and transgender identity as signs of decadence, disease, and immorality.

In June 2011, Kisauni Islamic College principal Sheikh Majid Obeid blamed inflation and drought on people who engage in same-sex acts. Council of Imams and Preachers of Kenya Organizing secretary Sheikh Mohammed Khalifa said, "We are asking Kenyans to shun businesses owned by such people and further show them open discrimination as a way of stopping the beastly act. They grossly abuse rights of others and should not be accepted among the society".

A mob of 100 people led by religious leaders and village elders on 23 February 2012 stormed a meeting of homosexuals at the Likoni CDF Youth Empowerment and Library Centre. Likoni police boss Abagarro Guyo and district officer Moses Ouma then ordered the meeting closed. Sheikh Amir Zani of the Muzadhalfa mosque described the seminar as "illegal, ungodly and unacceptable". He threatened to "mobilise the community to cane the gays if they organised such a meeting again". But the Ministry of Youth and Sports district officer, David Ogal, defended the organisers of the seminar and accused residents of misunderstanding their aims:

Here we are dealing with very vital education to vulnerable groups, including ... gays.... We are offering peer and HIV/AIDS education to the youth because they are at the highest risk of infection. ... The gay community, like other groups, approached us and requested to be educated on safe sex. They have a right to safe sex. By doing this, we are not promoting homosexuality but imparting knowledge. There is a lot of social discrimination and stigma about the issue and we as a society must fight it.

The governmental Kenya National Commission on Human Rights reported in April 2012 that,

LGBIs are discriminated, stigmatised and subjected to violence because of their sexual orientation. In cases where they need medical care, they suffer stigma perpetuated by health care providers who breach their privacy and confidentiality by exposing their sexual orientation to other colleagues at the facilities. The health care providers are not friendly and hardly understand their sexual and reproductive health needs. ... LGBIs face physical harassment by members of public who mock and assault them for practicing "unnatural" sexual relations. In cases of assault by mob justice, the police often fail to come to their rescue. Upon arrest, police subject them to unnecessary body and house searches allegedly looking for evidence that could link them to other crimes. They are profiled as drug users, past prison convicts or individuals with track records of crimes. They often face arbitrary arrest, are often detained at the police stations, subjected to torture and unnecessary harassment by the police who extort money from them and are only released after bribing their way out. They also suffer sexual abuse from the arresting officers. ... When their identities are discovered, LGBIs cannot seek employment or undertake other forms of business—for example, running a kiosk. Sometimes, they have to keep relocating to different residential areas to hide their identity. ... Further they are often evicted from their rental houses by neighbours and condemned for their orientation which is termed evil. In cases where they are not evicted ..., they are not allowed to use common utilities in the residential compounds such as swimming pools. LGBIs are also unable to access spiritual nourishment from the society because they are labelled as evil and the teachings in places of worship interpret LGBI activities as unnatural and unacceptable.

In response, Peter Karanja, the general secretary of the National Council of Churches of Kenya, said on 11 May 2012,

We are concerned that the direction the debate has taken is that of the recognition of homosexuality and prostitution which are against African beliefs and more so our Christian principles. This is a matter that deserves reflective discussion by our society in recognition of our values and beliefs. This is a view shared by our Muslim brothers and sisters. We do not however imply that those who practice them should be locked up, we believe they need assistance to change from these.

Julius Kalu, a bishop of the Anglican Church of Kenya in Mombasa, was reported to have said in July 2012 that the movement to allow same-sex marriages is a bigger threat to the Christian church than terrorism, even though Christians in Kenya have endured several terror attacks in 2012. However, on 11 August 2012 during a meeting with LGBTQ Christians, Kalu denied having made that statement: "It was not me who said that gays are worse than terrorists. Never. However, all things work together for good to those who love God and I confess to you that, that article, however disparaging and infamous, has helped me know a lot about LGBT people. Because of it, I have been contacted by my fellow bishops in the listening group in the UK, Canada[,] and individual LGBTI people in Kenya. Therefore, let me clear the air on this issue, I never said anything of that sort! This is my very first time to ever see or even meet with LGBTI people and especially from Kenya. It is indeed a shame to me that I've been shepherding to LGBTI people in the Anglican Church when I even don't know!" The July 2012 murder of Tanzanian LGBTQ rights campaigner Maurice Mjomba was raised during the meeting and Kalu was reported to have "appeared visibly disturbed, saddened[,] and struck with grief" by the news. According to the report, "he stated that there was a need for human societies to live in love, care[,] and harmony with one another without assigning indifferences." He condemned the murder of Mjomba as a "heinous and cowardly" act and expressed the wish that someday soon LGBTI people will live in a free world without "violence and discrimination".

In 2014, Binyavanga Wainaina, a famous Kenyan writer, came out publicly in the essay "I am a homosexual, mum". He was inspired to come out because of the difference in tolerance he saw between his Nairobi-based circle and the community of one of his friends, who was gay and had died the month before in Kisumu. Later that year, the Kenya Film Classification Board (KFCB) banned the LGBTQ-themed film Stories of Our Lives, made by a Nairobi-based arts collective, from distribution or screening in Kenya, on the grounds that it "promotes" homosexuality.

In 2015, Mark Kariuki, head of the Evangelical Alliance in Kenya and a bishop, said that then U.S. President Barack Obama should "leave the gay talk in America" during his state visit to Kenya. He also said that he does not want to "open doors for [Kenya] to be destroyed."

Rafiki, a 2018 Kenyan drama film directed by Wanuri Kahiu was internationally successful and the first Kenyan film to be screened at the prestigious Cannes Film Festival in France. However it was banned by the KFCB "due to its homosexual theme and clear intent to promote lesbianism in Kenya contrary to the law". The KFCB warned that anyone found in possession of the film would be in breach of the law in Kenya, where gay sex is punishable by 14 years in jail. The ban raised international outrage by the supporters of LGBTQ rights.

The film's director, Wanuri Kahiu, sued Kenya's government, to allow the film to be screened and become eligible to be submitted as Kenya's entry for the Academy Award for Best Foreign Language Film at the 91st Academy Awards. On 21 September 2018, the Kenyan High Court lifted the ban on the film, allowing it to be screened in the country for seven days, therefore meeting the eligibility requirements. After the ban was lifted, the film was shown to a sold-out crowd at a cinema in Nairobi. Despite the ban being lifted, it was not selected as Kenya's submission in the Foreign Language Film category, with Supa Modo being sent instead.

On July 5, 2025, the Kenyan government voted "for" of extending the mandate of the UN's Independent Expert on Sexual Orientation and Gender Identity (SOGI) and was one of the two countries to vote in favour, the other being South Africa. Kenya's vote was a surprise to many and there were negative reactions from Kenyan politicians and anti-LGBTQ+ groups, describing the vote as an act of betrayal and demanded Kenyan president, William Ruto to withdraw the vote by July 9, 2025. Despite the backlash, this sparked hope for LGBTQ+ people and groups in Kenya.

=== Views of government officials ===
In November 2010, Kenyan Prime Minister Raila Odinga said the behavior of gay couples was "unnatural" and that, "If found the homosexuals should be arrested and taken to relevant authorities". He asserted that "there was no need for homosexual relationships" because the most recent census showed there were more women than men. He said it was "madness for a man to fall in love with another man while there were plenty of women" and that "there was no need for women to engage in lesbianism yet they can bear children". Days later, Odinga denied ordering the arrest of gay couples, saying he meant only that same-sex marriages are illegal in Kenya.

In November 2010, the commissioner of prisons, Isaiah Osugo, announced a plan for closed-circuit television surveillance in Kenyan prisons to curb sex between male inmates.

The chief justice of the Kenyan Supreme Court, Willy Munyoki Mutunga, said at a groundbreaking ceremony for FIDA Uganda in Kampala on 8 September 2011,

The other frontier of marginalization is the gay rights movement. Gay rights are human rights. Here I'm simply confining my statement to the context of human rights and social justice paradigm, and avoiding the controversy that exists in our constitutions and various legislation. As far as I know, human rights principles that we work on, do not allow us to implement human rights selectively. We need clarity on this issue within the human rights movement in East Africa, if we are to face the challenges that are spearheaded by powerful political and religious forces in our midst. I find the arguments made by some of our human rights activists, the so-called "moral arguments", simply rationalizations for using human rights principles opportunistically and selectively. We need to bring together the opposing viewpoints in the movement of this issue for final and conclusive debate.

When former U.S. President Barack Obama visited Kenya in July 2015, Kenyan President Uhuru Kenyatta rebutted Obama's stance on equal rights for all, including sexual orientation, by stating that for Kenyans LGBTQ rights are a non-issue and not in line with Kenyan culture.

In April 2018, Kenyan President Uhuru Kenyatta said that LGBTQ rights are "not acceptable" and "of no importance to the people of the Republic of Kenya." He also added that the LGBTQ rights issue in Kenya is not an "issue of human rights" but an "issue of [Kenyan] society and culture."

== LGBT rights movement in Kenya ==
LGBTQ rights organisations in Kenya include Galck+, Gay Kenya Trust, National Gay & Lesbian Human Rights Commission, and the East Africa Trans Health & Advocacy Network.

In March 2019, 3 out of 5 judges in the Court of Appeal ruled that the government could not use colonial-era laws criminalising gay sexual activity to block the National Gay Lesbian Human Rights Commission (NGLHRC) from being registered as a non-profit organization, and dismissed the appeal after the government's Non-Governmental Organisations Coordination Board rejecting its application for registration as a charity on the basis that it was for gay and lesbian people. The government appealed the judgment to the Supreme Court, which in a 3-2 decision in 2023 dismissed the appeal.

The body of murdered LGBTQ activist and fashion business owner, Edwin Chiloba, was found in Uasin Gishu on 3 January 2023.

On April 30, 2024, the Mombasa High Court issued a ruling to stop anti-gay groups from inciting violence against the LGBTQ+ community, which was initiated by the Centre for Minority Rights and Strategic Litigation (CMRSL) who are seeking to protect the LGBTQ+ community from discrimination. The final ruling of this decision is expected to be on July 24, 2024.

== Summary table ==
Same-sex sexual activity legal	No Penalty: 14 to 21 years in prison with hard labor and fines. In 2023, member of parliament Peter Kaluma tabled a bill to penalise non-consensual homosexual acts with 50 years' imprisonment. (repeal proposed)
Equal age of consent	No
Anti-discrimination laws in employment only	Yes / No Some protections for Intersex people.
Anti-discrimination laws in the provision of goods and services	No
Anti-discrimination laws in all other areas (Incl. indirect discrimination, hate speech)	No
Same-sex marriages	No (Constitutional ban since 2010)
Recognition of same-sex couples	No
Stepchild adoption by same-sex couples	No
Joint adoption by same-sex couples	No
LGBTQ people allowed to serve openly in the military	No
Right to change legal gender	Yes / No Intersex recognized since 2022.
Access to IVF for lesbians	No
Conversion therapy made illegal	No
LGBTQ propaganda laws removed allowing LGBTQ freedom of expression	No
LGBTQ NGOs can be registered	Yes (Since 2023)
Commercial surrogacy for gay male couples	No
MSMs allowed to donate blood	No

== See also ==
- Human rights in Kenya
- Kenya Human Rights Commission
- LGBT rights in Africa
- Denis Nzioka
