= Denis Nzioka =

Kenyan activist, author and journalist

Denis Njoroge Nzioka
- Born: Nairobi, Kenya
- Occupations: activist, author and journalist
- Known for: Activism, Author, Journalism

Denis Njoroge Nzioka was a Kenyan author. He has been instrumental in the formation of several organizations focused on sexual diversity and sex workers' rights while supporting regional organizing around sexual diversity, bodily autonomy, and choice-expression.

== Life and work ==
Njoroge was born in Nairobi, Kenya and studied at the University of Embu. He graduated with a Bachelor of Arts degree in Animal Husbandry.

He founded Identity Kenya as a media agency and service. The Agency worked to transform public opinion and social attitudes through grassroots reporting and community commentary.

Njoroge was a 2013 Kenyan Presidential aspirant. He pioneered Identity Kenya, as well as a news app on the Google Play Store. He co-edited GKT's book My Way, Your Way or the Rights Way and published in 2019 an anthology book of Kenyan allies speaking out for marginalised rights titled Rafiki Zetu. In 2020, he launched an online archive, dubbed KumbuKumbu, an open, online, and free repository for records documenting the history and culture of diverse expressions and identities in Kenya from mid-1800 to the present.

He was writing his tenth book.

He was married to Edna Otieno, an advocate of the High Court of Kenya.

== Awards ==
Njoroge was named one of the World's Top 10 Tweeters on Sexuality and Development. He received the 2016 Sauti Award for "balanced reporting of sex work issues," and to celebrate their 10th anniversary, the South Africa Feathers Awards named him as its 2018 Africa honouree. He received the Munir Mazrui Lifetime Achievement Award from the Defenders Coalition.

== Death ==
Njoroge died on February 18, 2026. No known cause of death was announced in his official obituary.

== Publications ==
- My Way, Your Way, or the Rights Way. Nairobi: Storymoja, 2011.
- Rafiki Zeru: Kenyan LGBTIQ Stories, as told, by Allies. Nairobi, 2019.

== See also ==
- LGBT rights in Kenya
