= Murder of Sheila Lumumba =

2022 murder in Kenya

Sheila Adhiambo Lumumba was a Kenyan hotel worker and non-binary lesbian who was found killed on 17 April 2022.

== Timeline ==
On 15 April, Lumumba did not show up to work. Their co-workers attempted to call their phone, but did not receive a response. Their body was found two days later in their home. A post-mortem report was performed at Karatina Sub-County Hospital and found that they had been sexually assaulted and stabbed multiple times.

Lumumba's funeral service was held on 30 April.

On 20 July, openDemocracy reported that a man had been arrested and charged with murder over the case, with a court hearing to take place on 15 August.

== Reactions ==
The murder sparked widespread outrage in the Kenyan LGBT+ community. The Kenyan National Gay & Lesbian Human Rights Commission said that the murder was "part of a pattern of attacks and violence against LGBTIQ+ persons in the country". OutRight Action International said that it was part of "a series of homophobic and transphobic attacks" and that "failure to effectively respond to homophobic violence sends the message that violence against LGBTIQ individuals can be carried out with impunity". The Kenya Human Rights Commission stated that "too many queer Kenyans are getting killed with no accountability for perpetrators". Human Rights Watch called for the Kenyan government to repeal anti-LGBT+ laws and to include LGBT+ people in national plans against gender-based violence, saying that Lumumba was "invisible under Kenya’s current policies". The Kisumu Feminists' Society started a social media campaign using the hashtag #JusticeForSheila to raise awareness of the case and to pressure police to take better action.

== See also ==
- Edwin Chiloba
