= Kenya Film Classification Board =

Government media regulation agency in Kenya

- Type: State-owned enterprise
- Industry: Motion picture rating system
- Founded: 1 October 1963; 63 years ago
- Headquarters: Nairobi, Kenya
- Area served: Kenya
- Website: www.kfcb.go.ke

The Kenya Film Classification Board (abbreviated as KFCB) is a state corporation that operates under the Government of Kenya whose mandate is to "regulate the creation, broadcasting, possession, distribution and exhibition of films by rating them." The Board was founded in 1963 with the commencement of the laws outlined in the Films and Stage Plays Act of 1962 (Section 11) and has since involved itself in the rating and classification of films and television programmes. More recently, it has caused controversy by banning several films, such as the American box office success The Wolf of Wall Street, the Kenyan film Stories of Our Lives, Rafiki, and the 2015 film Fifty Shades of Grey based on the novel of the same name. The Board has also regulated television content, including advertisements.

== Formation ==
The Kenya Film Classification Board was established by the Films and Stage Plays Act of 1962 which came into force in 1963, mainly to regulate the creation, broadcasting, possession, distribution and exhibition of films by examining them for content, imposing age restrictions and giving consumer advice about various films. The Act gives the Board the power to approve or refuse to approve films and posters. The Act also states that approval is not to be granted to films that, in the Board's opinion, "prejudice the maintenance of public order or offend decency, or... [are] undesirable in the public interest. In addition, the Kenya Information and Communications Amendment Act of 2013 gives the Board the mandate to monitor television stations in order to "ensure content meant for adult audiences is not aired during watershed period (5am – 10pm)."

== Activities ==
The Board primarily classifies and rates films by examining them and giving them a 'certificate of approval' along with its rating of 0 to 4. This scale indicates the 'impact' of the film: "low", "mild", "moderate" or "strong". This then corresponds to the general rating of the film: GE (general exhibition), PG (parental guidance recommended), 16 (not suitable for persons under the age of 16) and 18 (not suitable for persons under the age of 18). After the certificate of approval is issued, the classification officer records the name of the film, its country of origin, rating and the date of rating and publishes the information in the KFCB classification catalogue. The Board's other activities include licensing film distributors in the country by granting film regulatory licenses to the distributors, and checking for violation of the terms of the license, including "license expiry, sale of unrated movies, sale/showing of restricted movies and misuse of classification labels."

=== Classification guidelines ===

- General exhibition: The content is suitable for general family viewing, as it does not contain content that could be considered harmful or disturbing to children. The content may be viewed by people of all ages.
  - Themes must be suitable for all ages.
  - Violence must be portrayed mildly, and the occasional mild threat or menace is acceptable if justified by context.
  - Sex or sexual preference of any kind must not be presented.
  - Nudity is not allowed.
  - Language must not be coarse or obscene.
  - Drugs presented must not be illegal, and no references to illegal drugs may be made.
  - Horror should be non-threatening and humorous. Should have only mild, non-disturbing fright scenes.

- PG (Parental Guidance): Content may be watched by everyone, however, parents are advised to monitor the content when being watched by children under 10 years.
  - Themes should have a low sense of threat or menace, and attention should be paid to their potential impact on children.
  - Violence may be portrayed moderately, if justified by context.
  - Sex may be implied, with only mild references to sexual activity (e.g. kissing and hugging)
  - Nudity must be "discreet" and "fleeting" when depicting a side profile. Must be infrequent when portraying the front or upper body, and then only in a non-sexual context.
  - Drugs that are illegal may have a discreet reference made to them as long as the drug use is not endorsed.
  - Horror portrayed should not be prolonged or intense.

- 16: These films are restricted to those below 16 years.
  - Themes portrayed may be mature, as long as they are "treated with discretion".
  - Violence is allowed if not prolonged or detailed. Sexual violence is not allowed.
  - Sex must neither be explicit or prolonged.
  - Nudity should be infrequent, brief, discreet and justified by context.
  - Drugs may be present if the film as a whole does not promote illegal drug use.
  - Horror may be more prolonged and frightening than previous categories.

- 18: These films are restricted to those below 18 years.
  - Themes portrayed and explored can be mature.
  - Violence and gore can be portrayed realistically if not "excessive, gratuitous or exploitative".
  - Sex may be explicitly portrayed if justifiable by context.
  - Nudity is allowed, as long as there is no close-up view of genitalia.
  - Language may be coarse and offensive if not "used excessively".
  - Drugs may be depicted as long as illegal drug use is not endorsed.
  - Horror may be prolonged and evoke intense fear.
- Restricted/banned: The content may not be viewed by anyone, as they "may contain materials that erode the moral fabric of society [or] undermine the national interest".
  - Themes promoted denigrate a race or religion, glorify undesirable behaviour such as pedophilia, or "glamorize a homosexual lifestyle."
  - Violence and cruelty is extreme and detailed, and may contain instructions on methods of crime or killings.
  - Sex is exploitative, pornographic or "depicts unnatural acts" such as bestiality.
  - Nudity is exploitative and excessive.
  - Drugs are illegal and their consumption is encouraged.

== Controversies ==
The Kenya Film Classification Board has banned several movies, videos and other content leading to concerns that it may be overstepping its boundaries The Board has been accused of imposing censorship in Kenya, notably when it termed the advent of American streaming company Netflix into Kenya a "threat to national security" and a "threat to Kenyan moral values".

The Board banned the American movie The Wolf of Wall Street, stating as its reasons the film's "extreme scenes of nudity, sex, debauchery, hedonism and cursing". On their Facebook page, the Board stated, "there is a limit to everything and we believe the Kenyan public deserves better. [Wolf of Wall Street] has been restricted. The film is not for sale, exhibition or distribution in Kenya. Violators shall be prosecuted."

Following the release of Kenyan film Stories of Our Lives depicting Kenya's LGBT community, the Board issued a ruling which effectively banned the film for "obscenity, explicit scenes of sexual activities and [for promoting] homosexuality, which is contrary to [Kenya's] national norms and values." The producers of the film subsequently criticised the Board, stating, "We made this film to [have an] open dialogue about identities, what it means to be Kenyan and what it means to be different. By placing a restriction on this film, the Board has chosen to delay this inevitable conversation." The producers further asked how "exactly...restricting a film, thus stifling a necessary conversation about society, safeguard[s] the national values and norms" and commented that the ban had increased awareness on the film, leading Kenyans to demand that they see the film.

The Board also banned American film Fifty Shades of Grey based on the novel of the same name citing as its reasons "prolonged and explicit sexual scenes depicting women as sexual slaves." The ban attracted protests by Kenyan activists, who said that the ban was a restriction on freedom of speech and "deeply worrying".

In 2016, Kenyan music group Art Attack released a remix video of the song Same Love by American hip hop duo Macklemore & Ryan Lewis depicting the life of LGBT persons in Kenya. They uploaded the video directly to YouTube and did not present it for rating by the KFCB. In response, the KFCB banned the video, citing that it "has graphic sexual scenes between people of the same gender as well as depiction of nudity and pornography" and requested that Google take it down from YouTube. However, Google Kenya refused to take it down, saying that they did not have the authority to remove the video. Google's office in Mountain View, California also refused to take down the video but flagged it, deeming it as "potentially inappropriate".

KFCB also banned beer and contraceptive advertisements that do not have the approval of the board, as well as any such advertisements from airing during the 'watershed period' of 5 a.m. to 10 p.m. The ban was extended to "advertisements and commercials that feature sexual innuendos and sexually suggestive scenes", as well as those that "glamorise lifestyles and behaviours such as homosexuality, promiscuity and juvenile delinquency". The KFCB used the rationale to ban a Coca-Cola advertisement containing a passionate kissing scene on the grounds that it "violated family values". The Coca-Cola Company agreed to replace the advertisement.

In June 2017, the KCFB ordered a ban on six cartoons airing on Cartoon Network Africa, Nickelodeon Africa and Nicktoons Africa for allegedly promoting LGBT themes to minors. The shows affected are the currently-running Cartoon Network shows Adventure Time, Clarence and Steven Universe, in addition to the already-ended Nickelodeon shows Hey Arnold! and The Legend of Korra, and the currently-running Nickelodeon cartoon The Loud House (These shows have not been banned, as Cartoon Network still shows these shows, but at night)

In April 2018, the Kenya Film Classification Board banned a film Rafiki due to alleged homosexual themes depicted in its content. The ban was criticised for stifling Kenyans' creativity, particularly because the film was notable for having been the first Kenyan film to be selected to air at the Cannes Film Festival.

== See also ==
- LGBT rights in Kenya
- Kenya Film Commission
