= Jim Chuchu =

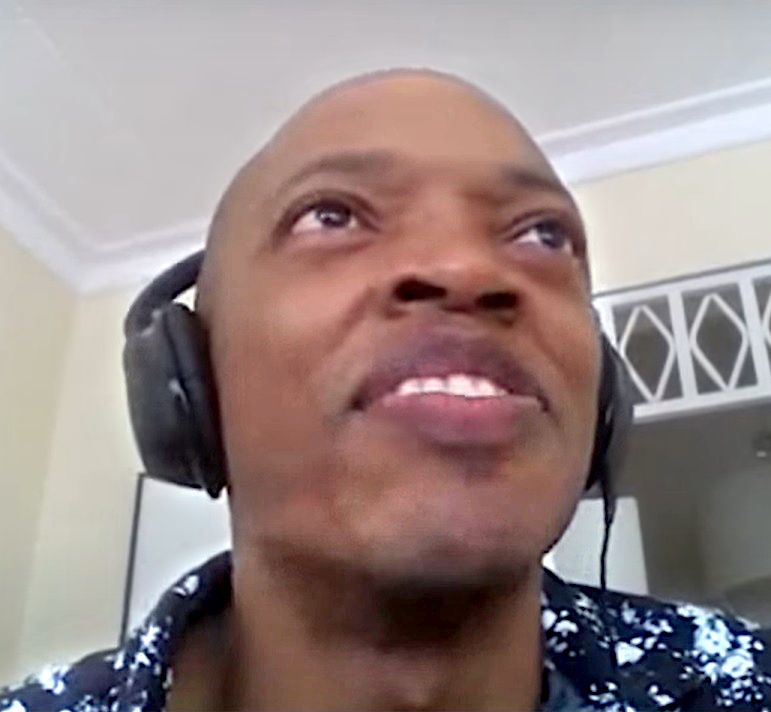
- Chuchu in 2015
- Born: 7 August 1982 (age 44); Nairobi, Kenya
- Occupations: Director, photographer, singer-songwriter, visual artist, record producer
- Years active: 2006–present
- Musical career
- Instruments: Vocals, guitar, synthesizer, sequencer, sampler
- Website: www.jimchuchu.com

Jim Chuchu (born 7 August 1982) is a Kenyan film director, photographer, singer-songwriter and visual artist. He first came to attention as a member of Kenyan music group Just a Band and subsequently as director of Kenyan LGBTQ+ film Stories of Our Lives.

== Career ==
After leaving college in 2006, where he studied telecommunications, Chuchu began his career as a graphic designer, working in advertising. He quit his job to become a freelance graphic designer in late 2006.

=== 2006–2012: Early career ===
In 2008, Chuchu co-founded Just a Band together with fellow members Bill "Blinky" Sellanga and Dan Muli, whom he had met while studying at the Kenyatta University. Jim performed multiple duties in the band, including co-producing the band's first three studio albums, Scratch to Reveal, 82 and Sorry for the Delay, creating graphic art for the band and directing many of the band's videos – including "Ha-He" which spawned viral hit Makmende, causing the video to be subsequently described as Kenya's first viral internet meme by The Wall Street Journal, CNN and Fast Company.

In 2012, Chuchu co-founded The Nest Collective, a multidisciplinary art space and collective in Nairobi.

In March 2013, Chuchu produced and released Imaginary Chains as pseudonymous act Adeiyu. One of the EP singles – Hollow – was featured in the Mercedes Benz Mixed Tape 55. He followed this EP by releasing the single You Can't Break Her Heart in September 2013.

In October 2013, Just A Band announced that Chuchu had left the band to pursue his solo projects. Following his exit, Chuchu then directed his first short film Homecoming as part of the African Metropolis project, which premiered at the 2013 Durban International Film Festival, then went on to screen at the 2013 Toronto International Film Festival, and the International Film Festival Rotterdam, Santa Barbara International Film Festival, the Film Festival Locarno and the Seattle International Film Festival in 2014.

In April 2014, Chuchu's photography series titled Pagans was featured in the 2014 edition of Dak’Art, the 11th Biennale of Contemporary African Art, as part of the Precarious Imaging: Visibility and Media Surrounding African Queerness exhibition in Dakar, Senegal. The show was cancelled a day after its opening by Senegalese authorities, who ruled that future exhibitions addressing the issue of homosexuality must be closed or canceled.

=== 2014: Stories of Our Lives ===
In September 2014, Chuchu released his first feature film, Stories of Our Lives, an anthology of five short films dramatizing true stories of LGBT life in Kenya which he directed as part of The Nest Collective. The film premiered at the 2014 Toronto International Film Festival, where it originally ran without credits due to the collective's concerns about the film's reception in Kenya, where homosexuality is illegal. Following the premiere, Chuchu and fellow Nest Collective members George Gachara and Njoki Ngumi opted to reveal their names at the screening and in an interview with Toronto's LGBT newspaper Xtra!. The soundtrack to the film, for which Chuchu produced and performed four songs, was released in late September as a free download.

=== 2014: Pagans ===
Pagans is a photographic series created by Chuchu that seeks to "[reconstruct] future-past anonymous African deities, their devotees and forgotten religious rites." One untitled work from 2014 depicts "a being with lustrous skin and sculpted muscles [who] looks upwards as fire and feathers emerge from his face." To create the pieces, Chuchu took black and white photographs of individuals, drew and painted additional elements on them, then scanned and digitally altered them.

Several photographs from Pagans were displayed at the exhibition "Precarious Imaging: Visibility and Media Surrounding African Queerness" as part of the 11th Dakar Biennial. The exhibition was one of the first on the African continent to focus on homosexuality. The exhibition was shut down prematurely by the Senegalese government after Muslim fundamentalists who oppose homosexuality in Senegal vandalized the exhibition gallery.

== Filmography ==
=== Feature films ===
- 2014: Stories of Our Lives

=== Short films ===
- 2013: Homecoming
- 2013: Dinka Translation
- 2013: Urban Hunter
- 2020: Tapi!

=== Web series ===
- 2016: Tuko Macho

== Videography ==
- 2013: Just a Band – Matatizo (co-director)
- 2011: Just a Band – Huff and Puff (co-director)
- 2011: Just a Band – Away
- 2010: Just a Band – Ha-He!
- 2009: Just a Band – Usinibore
- 2009: Stan – Wangeci
- 2009: Just a Band – If I Could
- 2009: Just a Band – Highway
- 2008: Just a Band – Hey!
- 2008: Just a Band – Fly
- 2008: Manjeru – Lalalalala
- 2008: Atemi – Speechless
- 2008: Just a Band – Iwinyo Piny
- 2008: Mena – Maisha

== Group exhibitions ==
Jim's photography and video works have been exhibited in the following group exhibitions:

- 2014: "Afropean Mimicry and Mockery", Künstlerhaus Mousonturm, Frankfurt.
- 2014: "Shifting Africa", Mediations Biennale Poznan, Poland.
- 2014: "Precarious Imaging", Raw Center for Art, Knowledge and Society, Dakar.
- 2014: "Future Reflexions: Five Positions of Contemporary African Art", Glasgow
- 2011: "Kudishnyao!" (Just A Band), Rush Arts Gallery (New York) and Goethe-Institut Nairobi
- 2010: "Mwangalio Tofauti: Nine Photographers from Kenya", Nairobi Gallery
- 2009: "TRNSMSSN:" (Just A Band), Goethe-Institut Nairobi
- 2009: "Amnesia": Nairobi National Museum.
- 2008: "24: Nairobi – Walkers and Workers", Goethe-Institut, Nairobi.

== Discography ==
=== Studio albums ===
- 2012: Sorry for the Delay
- 2010: 82
- 2008: Scratch to Reveal

=== EPs and singles ===
- 2014: Stories of Our Lives: Music from and Inspired by the Film (EP)
- 2014 Mayonde – "Isikuti Love" (Single)
- 2014 Jarel – "The Plus Minus Collection" (EP)
- 2013: Adeiyu – "You Can't Break Her Heart" (Single)
- 2013: Various Artists – The NEST Presents: Legacy (Compilation EP)
- 2013: Adeiyu – Imaginary Chains (EP)

=== Mixtapes and remix albums ===
- 2011: The Just A Band Boxing Day Special
- 2011: Kudish: The Sound of Soup

== Books ==
- Iwalewa: Four Views into Contemporary Africa. Iwalewa Haus, Bayreuth (2013). ISBN 9783000431159.
- Mwangalio Tofauti" – Nine Photographers from Kenya. Contact Zones NRB, Nairobi (2012). ISBN 978-9966-1553-3-7
- 24: Nairobi. Kwani Trust, Nairobi (2010). ISBN 996672950-X.
