= Njoki Ngumi =

Kenyan filmmaker and doctor

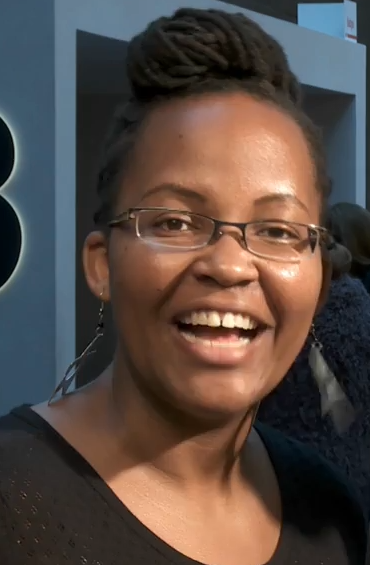
- Ngumi in 2015
- Occupations: filmmaker, doctor
- Notable work: Stories of Our Lives (2014)

Njoki Ngumi is a Kenyan filmmaker and doctor.

== Career ==
As a member of arts collaborative The Nest Collective, Ngumi has been involved in film, music and other art projects in Kenya. She is the screenwriter of Stories of Our Lives, a 2014 film recounting the experiences of LGBT Kenyans that was awarded the Teddy Award Jury Prize in 2015.

Ngumi was also involved in the #MyAlwaysExperience Twitter protest, claiming multinational companies produce substandard feminine products for the Kenyan market. She was among those who met with Procter & Gamble Kenya in 2019 to voice concerns, ultimately leading to an investigation by the Kenya Bureau of Standards.
