= Makmende =

Kenyan superhero character

- Ha-He video concept cover by Just a Band
- Also known as: Makmende is Back
- Genre: Super Hero
- Country of origin: Kenya

Makmende is a Kenyan superhero character which has enjoyed a popular resurgence after an adaptation by Kenya's musical group Just a Band in the music video for their song Ha-He on their second album, 82 (2009). The video became the first viral internet sensation originating from Kenya.

== History ==
The word Makmende is a sheng (Swahili slang) word which means "a hero". The name supposedly originated from the Kenyan neighborhood playgrounds. Anyone who thought they could do the impossible or a particularly difficult task was always asked whether they thought they were Makmende, since only Makmende could do or attempt to do the impossible. Makmende was a Kenyan childhood hero that had ability to handle all sort of chores, could win all childhood games, and was very energetic and strong.

== Resurgence ==
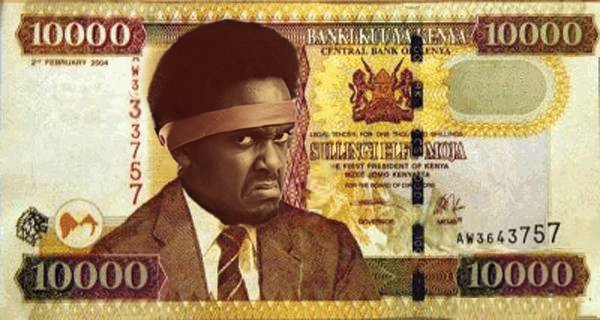
Makmende's portrait on a fictional 10,000 shillings Kenyan note

The video, directed by Jim Chuchu and Mbithi Masya, became a viral internet sensation and Kenyans launched an internet campaign for the "superhero" on Facebook, Twitter and other social media. The videos references blaxploitation and kung-fu movies in its style and features Makmende fighting with a variety of humorously named characters in a fictional city. The success of this video and the subsequent internet discussion has centered on the ways in which Kenyans were adopting social media. The cover graphic of the video has a black and white monotone portrait picture of Makmende placing a red head band across his forehead with the words MAKMENDE AMERUDI which is Swahili for MAKMENDE IS BACK. The role of Makmende on the video was played by graphics designer Kevin Maina, who had little previous acting experience.

As of April 2010, the Makmende website was one of the most visited by Kenyan Internet users, and the meme had a quickly growing fanbase on Facebook and Twitter. The Makmende story has also featured on CNN and was presented by CNN's David McKenzie. Makmende has also featured in articles in popular Kenyan media.

== Scholarly discussion ==
The meme is discussed by Heather Ford in an ethnographic analysis of African contributions to Wikipedia, entitled "The Missing Wikipedians". In this article she situates the multiple attempts to delete the Wikipedia entry on Makmende within broader debates on Deletionism and inclusionism in Wikipedia and gaps in geographical and cultural coverage of non-western topics on Wikipedia.
