= Just a Band =

Kenyan alternative band

- Origin: Nairobi, Kenya
- Genres: House, Funk, Disco, Soul, Pop, Electronica
- Years active: 2008–2016, 2022–present
- Members: Bill "Blinky" Sellanga; Dan Muli; Jim Chuchu; Mbithi Masya
- Website: justa.band

Just a Band is a Kenyan alternative band whose career was launched with their 2008 debut album, Scratch to Reveal. Their music has explored various musical directions such as jazz, hip-hop, disco, and electronica. The band are credited with creating Kenya's first viral music video after their 2010 music video for "Ha-He!"—featuring fictional Kenyan superhero-inspired protagonist Makmende—sparked countrywide interest.

== History ==
The group was formed when their members were studying at the Kenyatta University. They went on to release the song "Iwinyo Piny" accompanied by a self-made animated music video. Initially the song received little airplay due to its unconventional musical style, but with time they started to gain popularity through underground channels. Their debut album Scratch to reveal was relatively successful. They released their second single 'Ha-He' on 17 March 2010, accompanied by a music video featuring a character known as Makmende. The video has subsequently been described as Kenya's first viral internet meme by The Wall Street Journal, CNN and Fast Company.

=== Fictional band history ===
The fictional backstory of the band states that the trio was formed on 7 February 2003 and lists their disparate origins:

Dan had just returned to Kenya from three years of travelling with a Touareg caravan led by Hazim Barghai... Bill had no idea where he came from, having spent 13 years of his life under hypnosis. He came to his senses sometime in 2002, finding himself living in an abandoned convent in Limuru... Jim spent many years of his youth serving Arabic coffee in the coffee and opium dens of Kilgoris...

The group explained in 2016 that "The band has been active since 2008, and we held it in our heads as a burning idea for five years before that."

=== Scratch To Reveal (2008) ===
Just a Band released their debut album, Scratch to Reveal, on 17 May 2008 accompanied by self-made music videos for the singles, "Fly", "Iwinyo Piny" (using 2D animation) and "Hey!" (involving puppetry). The music video for "Iwinyo Piny" was subsequently nominated for the Best African Video Clip at the 2008 Kora Awards. The band also received a nomination for the Best Urban Fusion Group at the 2008 Kisima Awards.

=== TRNSMSSN: (2008) ===
In 2008, the Goethe-Institut Nairobi commissioned the band to create their first video art exhibition. The exhibition, titled "TRNSMSSN:", opened to the public in 2008 and consisted of a six-channel video presentation.

=== 82 (2009) ===
The trio released their sophomore studio effort, 82, on 2 October 2009. Just a Band signed a US licensing deal with Akwaaba Music, who re-released 82 on 23 February 2010.

The band released the video for their second single from the album Ha-He on Wednesday 17 March 2010. The video—a spoof of blaxploitation films, featuring a fictional superhero protagonist named "Makmende", sparked an online sensation and has since been described as "Kenya's first viral internet meme". The band were featured on CNN, The Wall Street Journal and Fast Company as a result.

Their song "Forever People (Do It So Delicious)" was featured in the Kenyan film Nairobi Half Life (2012). And "Huff-Puff" was in the Netflix tv show Sense8, season 2, episode 1.

=== BLNRB-NRBLN (2009) ===
In 2009, Just A Band took part in the BLNRB-NRBLN project, an electronic music exchange between Nairobi and Berlin. The project brought together Berlin electronic acts Modeselektor, Jahcoozi and Gebrüder Teichmann, with Kenyan acts Abbass, Nazizi, Ukoo Fulani Mau Mau. The resulting album—BLNRB - Welcome to the Madhouse—was released on 8 July 2011, and featured three singles by the band. The band joined the other acts in performances at the House of World Cultures in Berlin and the Stadtgarten in Cologne.

=== Sorry for the Delay (2012) ===
The band released their third studio album, Sorry for the Delay, on 27 October 2012.

=== Hiatus ===
In April 2016, the band announced a break to pursue solo projects. On 16 May 2022, Just a Band announced the end of the hiatus and release of new material slated for July 2022.

== Discography ==
- ech0 (2023)
- Sorry for the Delay (2012)
- BLNRB (2011)
- BLNRB EP (2010)
- 82 (2009)
- Scratch to Reveal (2008)
- Iwinyo Piny (2006)
- The Light Fantastic EP (2006)

== Producer credits ==
- Manjeru – Lalalalala (2006)
- Mena – Maisha (2006)
