= Galck+ =

Kenyan LGBTQ+ organization

- Formation: May 2006; 20 years ago
- Headquarters: Nairobi, Kenya
- Website: https://www.galck.org

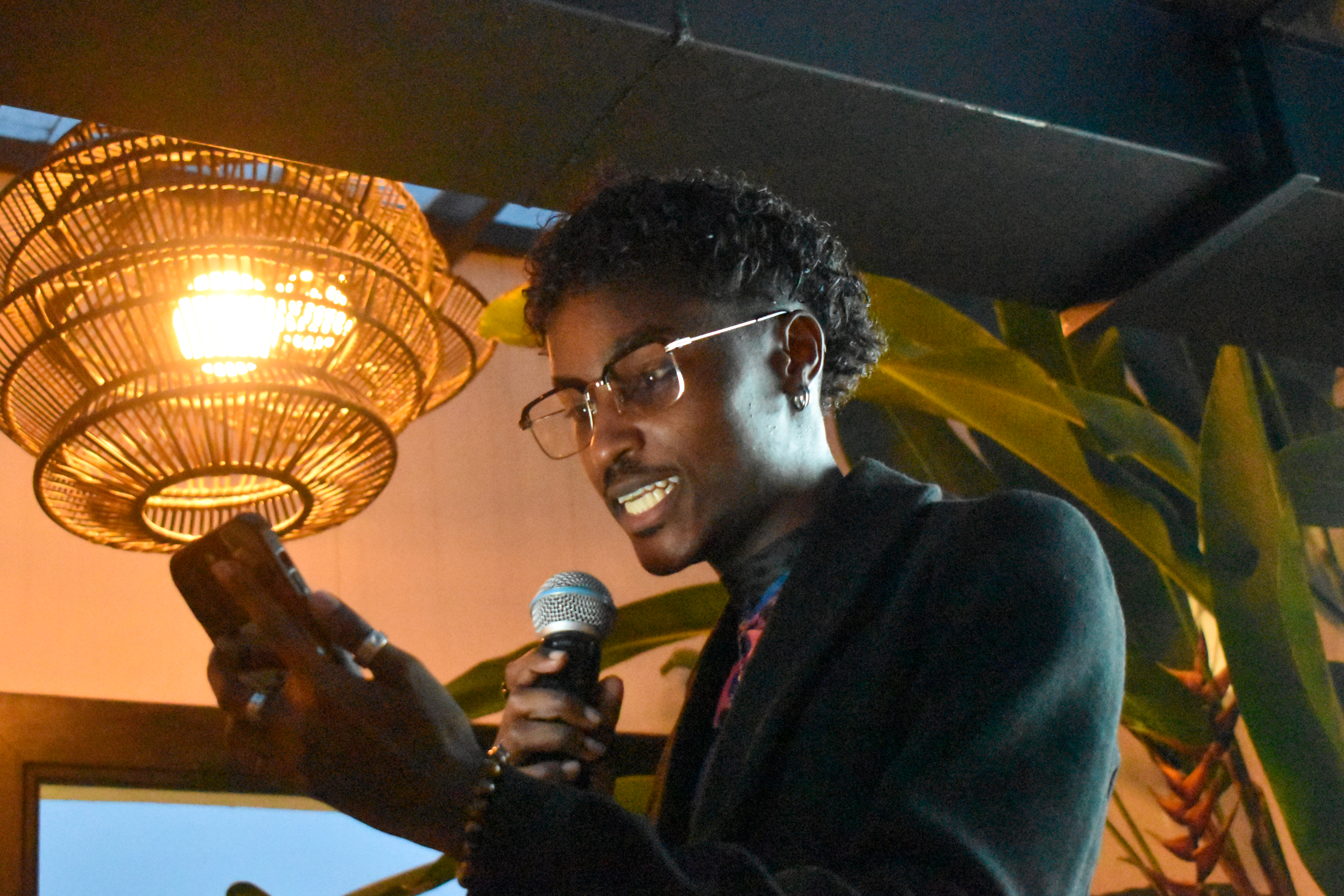
Member of Galck+ during a Wikimedia LGBT+ meetup in Nairobi in 2025.

galck+, formerly The Gay and Lesbian Coalition of Kenya (GALCK), is the national Sexual Orientation Gender Identity and Expression (SOGIE) umbrella body, representing LGBTQ+ voices across Kenya.

The name change was a result of the growth and intersectionality witnessed in the Kenyan LGBTQ+ movement. The organization's name is a reflection of this progress with inclusion and diversity at the heart of what they do.

== History ==
galck+ was established in May 2006 by local and regional activists of the Urgent Action Fund (UAF), a women's rights organization. galck+ has been instrumental in establishing (and re-establishing) working relationships and alliances with Government institutions and Civil Society organizations through which to inspire a society that appreciates diversity and recognizes that everyone has a right to equal opportunities irrespective of their real or perceived sexual orientation, gender and expression.

As the national umbrella organization, galck+ made considerable gains in increasing the voice and visibility of the Sexual Orientation Gender Identity and Expression (SOGIE) Movement until 2011 — 2012. The latter period, characterized by organizational and financial management challenges, brought almost all the organization's regular functioning to a standstill. In 2013, in a demonstration of extraordinary resilience, the community established the GALCK Reloaded Taskforce (GRT) to re-activate and restructure the Coalition and re-establish its position at the centre of the Kenyan SOGIE movement. Since then, the Coalition continues to provide comprehensive, rights-based services to its member groups through capacity building, positive visibility and stigma reduction.

galck+'s resource centre in Nairobi opened in 2008. A week before World Aids Day on 1 December 2008, galck+ mobilized 230 LGBTI people to attend voluntary counselling and testing (VCT) services held at the centre. This was the first time in Kenya that VCT services specifically targeted LGBTI people. Important lessons were learned about the existing VCT policy and implementation gaps, and the organisation is worked with the National AIDS Control Council (NACC), in collaboration with Liverpool VCT, Care and Treatment (LVCT), to address these gaps. The partnerships with mainstream organizations, like the Kenya Human Rights Commission, and HIV/AIDS bodies like LVCT and the NACC were groundbreaking since it got galck+ formally involved in the drafting of the National AIDS Strategic Plan for 2010–13.

== Member Organisations ==
Established in 2006, the coalition began with an initial membership of 4 organizations and expanded to 6 by the end of 2008. galck+ later expanded in membership to 14 and 16 in 2012 and 2014 respectively, representing LGBQ voices from across Kenya. The membership now stands at 18.

In 2013, galck+ rolled out a devolution process through which to decentralize its operations and programming beyond Nairobi. This was in response to an overwhelming need to identify and address grassroots needs and concerns across the regions, raised in 2012.

This process devolved the galck+ membership into 3 regional clusters, named after the peaks of Mount Kenya, Batian, Lenana and Nelion, which essentially categorized member organizations by the regions in which they are based and operate. The clustering mechanism's purpose was to strengthen cohesion and collaboration within the cluster membership through a peer-to-peer approach. Member organizations in each cluster can benefit from the experience and best practices of their peers. Each cluster is also at liberty to articulate a modus operandi that is deemed most appropriate/suitable to carry out the movement-building work.

=== Batian Cluster ===
- Kenya Youth Development and Education Support Association (KYdesa) - is a non-profit community-based organization founded in April 2009 and registered in 2012 as a Lesbian, Gay and Bisexual community-based organization. The organisation was established as a result of the MSM Posttest club during a community outreach engagement supported by LVCT Health in 2009.
- Q-Initiative - founded in 2010 by Lesbian, Gay and Bisexual students from Moi University who wanted to create a safe space for queer youth to convene and discuss their issues. It was registered as a community-based organization in August 2011 and became a member organization of GALCK in August 2012. Q-Initiative has since grown beyond Moi University's reach and now works with LGB youth from all over Eldoret and its environs.
- Gumzo Youth Group - registered formed in 2017 with the department of social works. The organisation is based in Kimilili, Bungoma County and operates between Bungoma and Trans- Nzoia counties.

=== Lenana Cluster ===
- Ishtar MSM – founded in 1999, Ishtar MSM was registered with the Ministry of Social Services as a self-support group dealing explicitly with MSM issues. In 2002, Ishtar upgraded its registration to Community Based Organisation. Since then, Ishtar has developed strong allies through partnerships and networks and is one of the founding members of galck+.
- Minority Women in Action (MWA Kenya) – formed in the year 2006, following a conference organized by Urgent Action Fund and partners that brought together Lesbian, Gay, Bisexual, Transgender and Intersex (LGBTI) individuals in East Africa. During this conference, it was noted that despite the overwhelming representation of SOGIE issues from organisations, Lesbian, Bisexual and Queer (LBQ) women's issues were highly ignored. This called for the formation of an organization that specifically catered for the needs and rights of Lesbian, Bisexual and Queer women in Kenya. The organisation also now caters for Gender Non-Conforming (GNC) people.
- Gay Kenya Trust – seeks to be the "leading human rights advocacy organization for the attainment of a society that is inclusive and free from discrimination on the basis of sexual orientation".
- HOYMAS Kenya – founded in 2009 by a group of male sex workers living positively, Health Options for Young Men on HIV/AIDS/STI (HOYMAS) is a Community-based organization registered by the Ministry of Social Services and Gender. HOYMAS serves male sex workers and young men and MSM with practical knowledge on safe sex, preventive materials distribution, general information and also economic empowerment.
- Queerhive Kenya – Queerhive Kenya is a Nairobi-based feminist, social support and queer-led non-profit that works to build safety, wellbeing, and collective power for Lesbian, Bisexual, Queer womxn & Gender Non-Conforming folk in Kenya. Formerly Kenya Campus Lasses Association (KCLA) which mainly focused on LBQ womxn, it was re-structured in 2018 to reflect and address the dynamic needs of its membership which comprises a significant percentage of gender non-conforming and nonbinary persons as well as LBQ womxn with founding roots established in 2011.
- Minority Persons Empowerment Program (MPEG) – Established in 2010, MPEG is a community platform that was created by community members who regularly met in restaurants and hook up spaces. Members would mobilise and talk about a wide array of issues including health, HIV and their social determinants.
- LEHA – an LBQ organization in Central Kenya Region whose aim is to advocate for all LBQ persons in the central Kenya region against discrimination, and human rights violations and to have access to quality health care. LEHA implements programs that are innovative, adaptive and targeted; that utilize existing structures; interventions that are evidence-based and that encompass results-based monitoring and evaluation and a participatory approach.

=== Nelion Cluster ===
- Persons Marginalized and Aggrieved (PEMA-Kenya) – formerly known as the Mombasa Brotherhood, seeks to "create, raise and promote public awareness, tolerance and acceptance of PEMA in the society".
- AMKENI Malindi – an LGBTIQ organization Founded in 2009 as an MSM youth supporting group. The organisation was later registered as an LGBTIQ community-based organisation in February 2012. Its mission is to promote economic, social and psychological aspects of lives to the highest level of standard possible considering all promotion prototypes while initializing all available resources to improve the lives of most at-risk persons.
- HIV & AIDS People's Alliance of Kenya (HAPA Kenya) – established in September 2011 after it emerged that a significant number of MSM/MSW living with HIV in the region were not adhering to treatment. It was from this that community members established a platform through which to demystify the myths related to HIV care and treatment and address other social-cultural deterrents to access and adherence to treatment including stigma and discrimination.
- Rainbow Women of Kenya (RWOK) – is a community-based organization organised for lesbian, bisexual and transgender women. It was established in July 2012 to promote, access and equally exercise a fully comprehensive health rights package and fulfil the fundamental human rights of LBT women.
- TAMBA Pwani – was founded by 40 members who identified as Gay men, Bisexual men, Transgender men and Male Sex Workers within Kilifi County (from Mtwapa to Malindi) in November 2010. This was an urgent response to a need for increased awareness about the MSM community and their health needs, in the face of ignorance, stigma and discrimination and violence.
- USAWA Kwa Wote Initiative (UKWELI) Mombasa – founded in 2010, UKWELI Mombasa is an LGBTI/ Male sex workers organization that offers HIV prevention, Sexual and Reproductive health, and Advocacy on social health to the sexual minorities in South Coast and Kwale County.
- Muamko Mpya – the organization is a membership organization located in Lamu county, North Coast of Kenya.

== See also ==
- LGBT rights in Kenya
