= Scratch to Reveal =

Scratch To Reveal

Studio album by Just a Band
- Released: May 17, 2008 (Kenya)
- Recorded: 2007–2008
- Genre: House, disco, hip hop, electronica
- Length: 43:50
- Label: Rauka Music
- Producer: Just a Band

Scratch to Reveal was released by Kenyan house/funk trio Just A Band in 2008.

Combining features of disco, funk and electronica, this was the first studio album by the Kenyan trio. The album includes "Oh Ndio", a remix of a song by the defunct Kenyan pop group Five Alive.

== Album information ==
Scratch to Reveal was initially slated for a May 10, 2007 release. This release date was pushed to May 17.

The album starts with the disco/house vibes of "Fly" and "Oh Ndio", explores softer acoustic tones towards the middle and returns to the disco feel with "Lights*Music*Stars". "Iwinyo Piny" appears as a bonus track, and a hidden track appears at the end of the album.

== Reception ==
Scratch to Reveal received generally positive reviews, garnering a five-star rating from WAPI Times, which described it as "full of dancy house gems laced with a little bit of industrial techno and drum and bass." Drum Magazine called it "a break from tradition, the trio have done a record completely devoid of the usual pseudo-reggae influences...truly avant-garde." Adam Magazine called it "a pleasant departure from usual Kenyan music." Just A Band's Single "Hey", off the album Scratch To Reveal was released on October 22, 2008. It was first played on Citizen TV's Power Breakfast. Hey is a powerful song with a powerful track and out of the ordinary actors to back it. The story of an ordinary guy, missing his girlfriend is portrayed by two puppets 'Boflo' and 'Katunge'. Boflo is professing his undying love for Katunge and calls all other girls 'Kadhalika' which roughly translated means etc...

== Track listing ==
1. "Fly" – 3:52
2. "Oh Ndio" – 3:28
3. "Maro Pa More" – 3:24
4. "FunkyFineBeautiful" – 3:24
5. "Do You Mind" – 2:39
6. "Hey!" – 3:49
7. "Bye Bye" – 3:54
8. "If I Could" – 3:05
9. "Twende Kazi" – 3:47
10. "Have You Seen Her?" – 3:20
11. "Lights*Music*Stars" - 3:51
12. "Iwinyo Piny" (bonus track) - 3:34
13. "Beba Na Finje" (hidden track) - 1:29

== Personnel ==
Just a Band	Vocals, Instrumentation
Liz Ogumbo	Vocals
Diana Nduba	Vocals
Sarah Mitaru	Vocals
Liam	Vocals
Manjeru Maina	Vocals

== Production ==
Executive producers	Just a Band
Mixing	Just a Band, Eric Musyoka
Instrumentation	Just a Band, Andrew Ngatia Wanjohi, David Gitoho, Eddie Grey, Livi Kantingima
Photography/Package Design	Jim Chuchu
