= Edwin Chiloba =

Kenyan LGBTQ activist (1998–2023)

Edwin Kiprotich Kiptoo
- Born: Edwin Kiprotich Kiptoo; 6 February 1997; Sergoit, Elgeyo-Marakwet County, Kenya
- Disappeared: 1 January 2023
- Body discovered: 6 January 2023 (aged 25) Eldoret, Uasin Gishu County, Kenya
- Burial place: Sergoit village, Elgeyo Marakwet County
- Education: University of Eldoret
- Occupations: Fashion designer, model, and LGBTQ activist
- Years active: 2018–2023

Edwin Kiprotich Kiptoo (6 February 1997 – January 2023), better known as Edwin Chiloba, was a Kenyan fashion designer, model, and LGBTQ activist.

== Early life and education ==
Chiloba was born in the small, sparsely populated village of Sergoit in Elgeyo-Marakwet County, Kenya. At a very young age, he lost his mother and then he was orphaned when his father died while he was in high school. He was a staunch Catholic growing up, joining the Young Christian Students at Sergoit Primary School. After spending his formative years moving from relative to relative, he eventually enrolled in the education program at Moi University's West Campus to earn his university degree. In 2019, he moved to Eldoret from Nairobi to study fashion.

== Fashion career and LGBTQ+ activism ==
During his third year of studies at Moi University West Campus, Chiloba began to actively pursue a career in fashion, creating outfits and attending photoshoots and pageants, much to his relatives' disapproval. This impacted the continuation of Edwin's degree where some people believed that he was being influenced by Satan. Chiloba dropped out and moved to Nairobi where he looked to become a fashion designer. It was then that he met Peter and Donna Pfaltzgraff, a missionary couple living and working in Kenya, through Facebook With support from the Pfaltzgraffs, he moved to Eldoret from Nairobi in 2019 to study a Fashion Design course at the University of Eldoret.

Edwin Chiloba was nominated for the Pulse Fashion Influencer of the year award in 2021.

In addition to fashion, Chiloba was an advocate for LGBTQ+ rights. In December 2022, he posted on his Instagram page that he was "going to fight for all marginalised people", saying that he had also suffered from marginalisation.

== Death ==
On 6 January 2023, Chiloba was found dead in a metal trunk by the roadside near Eldoret in Uasin Gishu County. Police were tipped off by a motorcycle taxi driver who reported seeing the box being dumped by a car with no license plates. The body was described as wearing women's clothing and was transported to Moi Teaching and Referral Hospital to establish the motive for the death. Chiloba was reported as missing, having last been seen on New Year's Day, when he returned home with friends in the early morning. Police believe that is the day that Chiloba was killed, as neighbors reported to have heard "commotion and cries which subsided after a short while".

Uasin Gishu county criminal investigations officer Peter Kimulwo announced that Jackton Odhiambo, a 24-year-old photographer who was described as a "longtime friend" of Chiloba and had been visiting him from Nairobi, had been arrested in connection with Chiloba's death. On 8 January, it was announced that three more people had been arrested in connection with the murder. On 4 December 2024, Odhiambo was convicted of Chiloba's murder. On 16 December 2024, Odhiambo was sentenced to 50 years in prison for murdering Chiloba.

Rights groups have been described as speculating that Chiloba's murder was in connection to his sexuality, but no motive has been determined as of yet.

Chiloba was buried on 17 January in Sergoit village, Elgeyo Marakwet County.

== See also ==
- Murder of Sheila Lumumba
