= The Rite (soundtrack) =

The Rite (Original Motion Picture Score)

Film score by Alex Heffes
- Released: January 25, 2011
- Recorded: 2010–2011
- Studio: Eastwood Scoring Stage, Warner Bros. Studios, Burbank, California; Barbara Streisand Scoring Stage, Sony Pictures Studios, Culver City, California
- Genre: Film score
- Length: 56:28
- Label: Silva Screen
- Producer: Alex Heffes

Alex Heffes chronology
Inside Job (2010)	The Rite (2011)	Red Riding Hood (2011)

The Rite (Original Motion Picture Score) is the film score to the 2011 film The Rite directed by Mikael Håfström. The original score was composed by Alex Heffes and was released through Silva Screen Records on January 25, 2011.

== Development ==
The original score is composed by Alex Heffes, who stated that he liked it owing to Håfström's direction, cinematography and performances, especially from Anthony Hopkins, whose acting was described as "jumping off point" for him and his music. Heffes added that the film was less horror and more psychologically driven with regards to the main performances, as well as the religious aspect in the film takes the music in a certain direction. The film was set in the Vatican City, where a certain musical palette had been associated, however, the music stemmed from the central performances and its treatment being a psychological horror or thriller. The score was recorded at the Warner Bros. Eastwood Scoring Stage and Barbara Streisand Scoring Stage in Sony Pictures Studios.

== Reception ==
William Ruhlmann of AllMusic wrote "this does not sound like the music for a typical horror movie. Rather, it suggests that The Rite is a film full of foreshadowing in which the fear is as much located in what the audience anticipates than in what it actually gets to see." Glen Chapman of Den of Geek wrote "There are moments of overt horror bombast, but the overall tone of the piece is quite subdued, which makes the horror moments all the more effective. It's not a typical horror score and it's quite nice that Heffes has tried something different from the norm by not relying on gradual builds of tension."

Christopher Coleman of Tracksounds wrote "Heffes' music focuses on the subtext rather than the obvious, and the result is a satisfying and even memorable production that supports the film perfectly and offers listeners and engaging and well-rounded listening experience on album." Bill Gibron of PopMatters stated "for the most part, the soundtrack to The Rite retains a nice slice of aural originality." Steve Barton of Dread Central states that the score "comes across as good background music for a haunted house/adventure/generic horror flick". Joe Leydon of Variety called it a "first-rate" score among other technical aspects. Darren Rea of Review Graveyard wrote "this is an enjoyable soundtrack that has plenty of depth and emotion".

== Track listing ==
No.	Title	Length
1.	"The Procedure"	02:01
2.	"Going to Rome"	03:11
3.	"The Accident"	02:47
4.	"The First Exorcism"	03:08
5.	"God's Fingernail"	02:28
6.	"Rosaria Coughs up the Nails"	04:35
7.	"Michael Remembers/The Hospital"	07:14
8.	"Angeline's Story"	03:03
9.	"Phone call to Father"	02:03
10.	"The Terror is Real"	04:25
11.	"Exorcism of Lucas Part 1"	07:35
12.	"The Final Exorcism"	06:43
13.	"The Farewell"	07:15
Total length:		56:28

== Personnel ==
Credits adapted from liner notes:

- Music composer and producer – Alex Heffes
- Engineer – Greg Loskorn
- Assistant engineer – Matt Ward
- Technical engineer – Ryan Robinson
- Recording – Joel Iwataki, Dennis Sands
- Digital recordist – Larry Mah
- Score recordist – Adam Michalak, Tom Hardisty
- Mixing – Joel Iwataki
- Music editor – Peter Myles
- Technical assistance – Daniel Lerner
- Music coordinator – Pete Compton
- Copyist – Mark Graham
- Artwork – Robert Croucher
- Liner notes – Mikael Håfström
- Executive producer – David Stoner, Reynold D'Silva
- Executive in charge of music – Erin Scully
- Music business affairs – Dirk Hebert

Orchestra

- Orchestrators – Andrew Kinney, Ben Wallfisch, Jeff Atmajian
- Orchestra conductor – Alex Heffes
- Orchestra contractor – Peter Rotter, Sandy De Crescent
- Concertmaster – Roger Wilkie

Instruments

- Bass – Bruce Morgenthaler, David Parmeter, Drew D. Dembowski, Edward Meares, Michael Valerio, Nico Carmine Abondolo (1st), Oscar Hidalgo, Stephen Dress
- Bassoon – Allen M. Savedoff, Kenneth Munday, Michael O'Donovan
- Cello – Andrew T. Shulman (1st), Antony Cooke, Armen Ksajikian, Cecelia Tsan, Christina Soule, Christine Ermacoff, David Speltz, Erika Duke-Kirkpatrick, László Mezö, Steve Erdody, Ting Guo, Trevor Handy
- Clarinet – Gary S. Bovyer, Ralph Williams, Stuart Clark (1st)
- Flute – David Shostac, Geraldine Rotella (1st), Sara E. Andon
- Harp – Jo Ann Turovsky
- Horn – Daniel P. Kelley, David Everson, James W. Thatcher (1st), Mark L. Adams
- Oboe – Chris Bleth, Phillip Ayling (1st)
- Percussion – Alan Estes (1st), Donald J. Williams, Wade Culbreath
- Trombone – Alexander Iles, William Booth (1st), William F. Reichenbach, George Thatcher
- Trumpet – David Washburn, Timothy Morrison (1st)
- Tuba – Doug Tornquist
- Viola – Andrew Duckles, Brian Dembow (1st), Darrin Mc Cann, David F. Walther, Matthew Funes, Michael Nowak, Pamela Jacobson, Pamela Goldsmith, Robert A. Brophy, Shawn Mann, Victoria Miskolczy
- Violin – Alyssa Park, Amy Hershberger, Bruce Dukov, Elizabeth Hedman, Eun-Mee Ahn, Helen Nightengale, Jessica E. Guideri, Julie Ann Gigante, Katia Popov, Lisa M. Sutton, Natalie Leggett, Nina Evtuhov, Phillip Levy, Roberto Cani, Sarah Thornblade, Searmi Park, Serena Mc Kinney, Shalini Vijayan, Songa Lee, Tamara Hatwan, Tereza L. Stanislav (1st), Yelena Yegoryan

Choir

- Choir conductor and contractor – Jasper Randall
- Alto vocals – Aleta Braxton, Amber Erwin, Amy Fogerson, Drea Pressley, Kimberly Switzer, Michelle Hemmings, Nancy Sulahian, Niké St. Clair
- Bass vocals – Bob Joyce, Douglas Shabe, Greg Davies, Guy Maeda, Jim Campbell, Jules Green, Mark Beasom, Mark Edward Smith, Michael Geiger, Reid Bruton, Scott Graff, Vatsche Barsoumian
- Soprano vocals – Ayana Haviv, Claire Fedoruk, Elin Carlson, Elissa Johnston, Elyse Marchant, Karen Hogle Brown, Karen Whipple Schnurr, Lesley Leighton
- Tenor vocals – Augie Castagnola, Chris Gambol, Daniel Chaney, George Sterne, Gerald White, J. Wingate Greathouse, Jody Golightly, Jonathan Mack, Michael Lichtenauer, Shawn Kirchner, Steven Harms

== Accolades ==
Award	Category	Recipient(s) and nominee(s)	Result	Ref.
World Soundtrack Awards	Discovery of the Year	Alex Heffes (also for The First Grader)	Won	

In addition, the score was shortlisted as one among the 97 contenders for the Best Original Score category at the 84th Academy Awards.
