= The First Grader (soundtrack) =

The First Grader (Original Motion Picture Soundtrack)

Film score by Alex Heffes
- Released: June 14, 2011
- Recorded: 2010–2011
- Genre: Film score
- Length: 49:22
- Label: Varèse Sarabande
- Producer: Alex Heffes

Alex Heffes chronology
Red Riding Hood (2011)	The First Grader (2011)	The Engagement (2011)

The First Grader (Original Motion Picture Soundtrack) is the film score to the 2010 film The First Grader directed by Justin Chadwick. The film score is composed by Alex Heffes and released through Varèse Sarabande on June 14, 2011. For his work, Heffes received the Ivor Novello Award for Best Original Film Score and World Soundtrack Award for Discovery of the Year.

== Development ==
Alex Heffes collaborated with Chadwick for the first time in The First Grader. The score was written quickly as he was really inspired by the film after watching a rought cut. When Chadwick met him at the studio regarding any ideas, he revealed on writing half of the film's music as he liked it much owing to the story, and wrote more music afterwards. He recalled that Justin listened the film's music with producer David Thompson and both of them liked their work, adding "When you really feel something, you do your best work". Besides the score, much of the original music featured in the film were recorded live.

== Track listing ==
No.	Title	Artist(s)	Length
1.	"Maruge Digs"		2:20
2.	"Courage"	Eric Herman feat. Vieux Farka Touré	4:19
3.	"The School"		2:40
4.	"Maruge Buys His Uniform"		1:56
5.	"Buried Memories"		3:49
6.	"The Raid"		2:47
7.	"I Had A Family"		3:14
8.	"Teach Me To Read"		2:30
9.	"Maruge's Fame Spreads"		2:15
10.	"The Execution"		3:48
11.	"We Want Our Cut"		3:14
12.	"The Childrens' Rebellion"		3:25
13.	"Maruge's Speech And Jane Returns"		5:27
14.	"Reading The Letter"		2:14
15.	"Walk On"	feat. Kawesa	2:56
16.	"Playground Song"	Kathyline Ndogiri Mbirua feat. The Children of Massi Plains View Academy	2:28
Total length:			49:22

== Reception ==
Peter Debruge of Variety, Tim Grierson of Screen International and Stephen Farber of The Hollywood Reporter called the score, "moving", "inspirational" and "emotional". Richard Propes of The Independent Critic wrote "The music by Alex Heffes largely companions the film's more dramatic story arc, yet does little to capture the wonder and heart that the film's title and trailer would indicate."

== Accolades ==
Besides the following awards, the score was considered to be in contention for the Best Original Score category at the 84th Academy Awards.

Award	Category	Recipient(s) and nominee(s)	Result	Ref.
Black Reel Awards	Outstanding Original Score	Alex Heffes	Nominated	
Ivor Novello Awards	Best Original Film Score	Alex Heffes	Won	
NAACP Image Awards	Outstanding Soundtrack Album	Alex Heffes	Nominated	
World Soundtrack Awards	Discovery of the Year	Alex Heffes (also for The Rite)	Won	

== Personnel ==
Credits adapted from production notes:

- Music composer, producer and conductor: Alex Heffes
- Orchestrator: Julian Kershaw
- Recording: Geoff Foster at Abbey Road Studios, London; Sam Bisaso at Black Smith Studios, London
- Recording assistance: Lewis Jones, Pete Hutchings
- Mixing: Nick Taylor at Air-Edel Recording Studios, London
- Mixing assistance: Tom Bullen
- Music supervisor: Maggie Redford
- Music supervising assistant: Helen Yates
- Composer's assistant: Lewis Morrison
- Music preparation services: Cutting Edge
- Music preparation executive producer: Phil Hope
- Conductor: Alex Heffes
- Musicians' coordinator: Hillary Skewes, Clarissa Faran
- Featured vocalists: Kawesa, Sona Jobarteh
- Kora: Tunde Jegede
- Guitars: Leo Abrahams
- Solo woodwinds: Dirk Cambell
- Gospel choir: Beverley Skeet, Sara-Jane Skeele, Ricci P Washington, Andy Caine
