= World Soundtrack Awards 2011 =

Belgian music awards ceremony

11th World Soundtrack Awards

October 22, 2011

Best Original Soundtrack:
Inception

The 11th World Soundtrack Awards were given out on 22 October 2011 in Ghent, Belgium.

== Awards ==
=== Best Original Soundtrack ===
  - Inception by Hans Zimmer
- The Social Network by Trent Reznor, Atticus Ross
- Black Swan by Clint Mansell
- The King's Speech by Alexandre Desplat
- True Grit by Carter Burwell

=== Soundtrack Composer of the Year ===
  - Alexandre Desplat for The King's Speech, A Better Life, The Well-Digger's Daughter, Harry Potter and the Deathly Hallows – Part 2, Harry Potter and the Deathly Hallows – Part 1, The Burma Conspiracy and The Tree of Life
- Patrick Doyle for Jig, La Ligne droite and Thor
- Hans Zimmer for How Do You Know, Rango, Inception, Pirates of the Caribbean: On Stranger Tides, Kung Fu Panda 2, The Dilemma, Megamind
- John Powell for Mars Needs Moms, Rio and Kung Fu Panda 2
- Clint Mansell for Last Night, Black Swan and Faster

=== Best Original Song Written for a Film ===
  - Randy Newman for "We Belong Together" in Toy Story 3
- Dido (lyrics/performer), Rollo Armstrong (lyrics), A. R. Rahman (music/performer) for "If I Rise" in 127 Hours
- Gwyneth Paltrow (performer), Hillary Lindsey (music/lyric), Troy Verges (music/lyrics), Tom Douglas (music/lyrics), Bob DiPiero (music/lyrics) for "Coming Home" in Country Strong
- Cher (performer), Diane Warren (music/lyrics) for "You Haven't Seen the Last of Me" in Burlesque
- Alan Menken (music), Glenn Slater (music/lyrics), Mandy Moore (performer), Zachary Levi (performer) for "I See the Light" in Tangled

=== Discover of the Year ===
  - The First Grader, The Rite by Alex Heffes
- Limitless by Paul Leonard-Morgan
- Natural Selection, Hamill by iZLER
- Hanna by Ed Simons, Tom Rowlands
- X-Men: First Class and Gulliver's Travels by Henry Jackman

=== Public Choice Award ===
  - A. R. Rahman for 127 Hours

=== SABAM Award for Best Young European Composer ===
  - Gabriel-Heinrich Yden

=== Lifetime Achievement Award ===
  - Giorgio Moroder
