= Jecheon International Music & Film Festival =

Music and film festival in South Korea

Jecheon Intl Music & Film Festival
- Official logo
- Genre: K-pop; Film
- Dates: August
- Locations: Jecheon, South Korea
- Years active: 2004–present
- Website: JIMFF

Jecheon International Music & Film Festival (제천국제음악영화제, JIMFF) strives to be both a celebration of film set in Jecheon City and music for all generations and musical tastes. Jecheon is located in Chungcheongbuk province in central South Korea.

It is the Jecheon Music Film Festival held in mid-August every year since 2005. Initially, it was a non-competitive film festival, but from the fifth episode, it is being held as a partial competition. The logo and the Korean logo type are the works of local resident Lee Cheol-soo.

In line with the name of the music film festival, most of the films screened are music-centered works. Since some year, musicians have been invited to watch silent films every time. In addition, works such as Once and Kapping Beethoven, which have already been screened and succeeded, or have been officially distributed at the festival, are also coming out. During the festival, the Academy of Motion Picture Music is also held.

Until the third episode, there was a seat even if I went and bought a ticket before the screening time, but as the word of mouth went viral, the tickets on the day were sold out immediately after the on-site release began.

The 7th Jecheon International Film Festival featured 100 films and 70 performances from 26 countries for six days from August 11-16, 2011, and organized various genres of programs throughout the festival, recording a seat share of 82.1%, and a total of 63 films were sold out, with 130,000 audiences visiting Jecheon to share the festival of film and music.

The 13th edition of JIMFF was held from 10 to 15 August 2017.

"World Music Film Today", JIMFF's sole competition section, will present films from around the world. The jury members will award two outstanding films with the Grand Prize and Special Jury Prize among the most contemporary selections related to music regardless of genre.

Other sections will introduce the various aspects of music cinema and a number of musical performances staged outdoors on the shores of Cheongpung Lake. The Jecheon Film Music Award honors film musicians who have had significant influence on Korean film and music culture and the Jecheon Film Music Academy is a program designed for specialized education about film music.

Due to the coronavirus pandemic, which hit the world in 2020, the 16th festival was changed to 100% online screening, following the footsteps of the Jeonju International Film Festival.

The 17th edition of The Jecheon International Music and Film was held from 12 to 17 August 2021. The World Music Film Flow (International Competition) Best Picture Award was given to A Thousand Rockers, One Band by Anita Rivaroli. The 18th edition of The Jecheon International Music and Film was held from 11 to 16 August 2022.

From the 19th Film Festival in 2023, music director Lee Dong-joon was appointed as executive chairman and screened 105 films under the slogan "Da Capo."

The 20th film festival in 2024 will begin in early September for the first time, and a K-pop concert has been planned with a budget of at least 700 million won.

== Film program ==
- World Music Film Today: The official competition at JIMFF for the feature-length film (More than 60mins without genre limits)
- Cine Symphony : A series of narrative films and musical films that focus on music; This program addresses various musical ways throughout acclaimed new music themed dramatic films all around the world
- Music in Sight : Documentary films that focus on any genre of music and musicians’ life
- Korean Music Film Now: The Korean latest music films in the various genres including narrative, documentaries and animated films
- Family Fest: Featuring popular films that appeal to the broad generations
- Theme and Variations: Various films under a specific theme
- Cinema Concert: The film screening that is accompanied by a musical soundtrack played by a musician in sync at the stage

== Music program ==
- One Summer Night
- Uirim Summer Night

== Special program ==
- Jecheon Music Academy
- JIMFF Forum

== History ==
Year	Edition	Opening date	Closing date	Opening film	Closing film	Film	Music live
2005	1	08/10	08/14	Swing Girls	Allegro Non Troppo	40	15
2006	2	08/09	08/14	Two Sons of Francisco	Parineeta	45	20
2007	3	08/09	08/14	Once	Copying Beethoven	73	30
2008	4	08/14	08/19	Young@Heart	The Visitor	81	30
2009	5	08/13	08/18	The Soloist	Anvil! The Story of Anvil	87	30
2010	6	08/12	08/17	The Concert	The Voice of Life	84	30
2011	7	08/11	08/16	The Music Never Stopped	Chico and Rita	100	30
2012	8	08/09	08/15	Searching for Sugar Man	Paradiso, an Amsterdam Stage Affair	101	30
2013	9	08/14	08/19	Pop Redemption	Beware of Mr.Baker	92	45
2014	10	08/14	08/19	Golden Chariot in the Sky	Blue Sky Bones	87	100
2015	11	08/13	08/18	Try to Remember	Keep on Keepin' On	103	100
2016	12	08/11	08/16	Violin Teacher	Cool Cats	105	100
2017	13	08/10	08/15	Django	El Viaje - A Road Trip into Chiles Musical Heritage	107	100
2018	14	August 9	August 14				
2019	15	August 8	August 13	Inna de Yard: The Soul of Jamaica by Peter Webber			
2020	16	August 13	August 18	Da Capo			
2021	17	August 12	August 17	Tina	TBA	116	12
2022	18	August 11	August 16	Sonata	TBA		
2023	19	August 10	August 15	Music Chappelle	Blue Giant	104	21
2024	20	September 5	September 10	Ava: The Legend	We're going to cheer for a few minutes	96	26

== See also ==
- List of music festivals in South Korea
- List of film festivals in South Korea
