= List of 2011 box office number-one films in Venezuela =

This is a list of films which have placed number one at the weekend box office in Venezuela during 2011.

== Number-one films ==
†	This implies the highest-grossing movie of the year.

#	Date	Film	Gross	Notes
1	January 9, 2011	Tangled	$412,549	
2	January 16, 2011	The Green Hornet	$445,617	
3	January 23, 2011	The Green Hornet	$286,845	
4	January 30, 2011	Yogi Bear	$522,743	
5	February 6, 2011	Yogi Bear	$520,410	
6	February 13, 2011	The Chronicles of Narnia: The Voyage of the Dawn Treader	$562,493	
7	February 20, 2011	The Chronicles of Narnia: The Voyage of the Dawn Treader	$486,311	
8	February 27, 2011	Gulliver's Travels	$429,671	
9	March 6, 2011	The Rite	$342,073	
10	March 13, 2011	The Rite	$358,272	
12	March 20, 2011	The Rite	$283,145	
13	March 27, 2011	Battle: Los Angeles	$371,708	
14	April 3, 2011	Battle: Los Angeles	$312,285	
15	April 10, 2011	Rio	$385,621	
16	April 17, 2011	Rio	$973,886	
17	April 24, 2011	Rio	$959,197	
18	May 1, 2011	Rio	$682,178	
19	May 8, 2011	Thor	$483,214	
20	May 15, 2011	Rio	$378,683	
21	May 22, 2011	Pirates of the Caribbean: On Stranger Tides	$1,138,344	
22	May 29, 2011	Pirates of the Caribbean: On Stranger Tides	$900,721	
23	June 5, 2011	Fast Five	$863,090	
24	June 12, 2011	Kung Fu Panda 2 †	$956,593	
25	June 19, 2011	Kung Fu Panda 2 †	$932,161	
26	June 26, 2011	Kung Fu Panda 2 †	$1,102,628	
27	July 3, 2011	Kung Fu Panda 2 †	$713,005	
28	July 10, 2011	Kung Fu Panda 2 †	$287,523	
29	July 17, 2011	Harry Potter and the Deathly Hallows – Part 2	$1,771,114	Harry Potter and the Deathly Hallows - Part 2 had the highest weekend debut of 2011.
30	July 24, 2011	Harry Potter and the Deathly Hallows – Part 2	$1,061,911	
31	July 31, 2011	Harry Potter and the Deathly Hallows – Part 2	$787,993	
32	August 7, 2011	The Smurfs	$1,236,625	
33	August 14, 2011	The Smurfs	$1,187,166	
34	August 21, 2011	Cars 2	$904,220	
35	August 28, 2011	Cars 2	$680,206	
36	September 4, 2011	Green Lantern	$625,563	
37	September 11, 2011	Green Lantern	$425,892	
38	September 18, 2011	Mr. Popper's Penguins	$341,709	
39	September 25, 2011	Mr. Popper's Penguins	$328,195	
40	October 2, 2011	Rise of the Planet of the Apes	$351,371	
41	October 9, 2011	Rise of the Planet of the Apes	$315,543	
42	October 16, 2011	Transformers: Dark of the Moon	$584,593	
43	October 23, 2011	Transformers: Dark of the Moon	$410,923	
44	October 30, 2011	Final Destination 5	$369,985	
45	November 6, 2011	Final Destination 5	$375,092	
46	November 13, 2011	The Lion King 3D	$401,394	
47	November 20, 2011	The Twilight Saga: Breaking Dawn - Part 1	$1,152,461	
48	November 27, 2011	The Twilight Saga: Breaking Dawn - Part 1	$743,340	
49	December 4, 2011	Arthur Christmas	$460,990	
50	December 11, 2011	Puss in Boots	$925,758	
51	December 18, 2011	Puss in Boots	$863,264	
52	December 25, 2011	Puss in Boots	$243,993	
53	January 1, 2012	Puss in Boots	$232,858	

== Highest-grossing films ==
Highest-grossing films of 2011 in Venezuela
Rank	Title	Studio	Domestic Gross
1.	Kung Fu Panda 2	Paramount Pictures / DreamWorks Animation	$8,363,469
2.	Rio	20th Century Fox / Blue Sky Studios	$8,133,434
3.	The Smurfs	Columbia Pictures / Sony Pictures Animation	$7,757,729
4.	Harry Potter and the Deathly Hallows – Part 2	Warner Bros. / Heyday Films	$7,526,732
5.	Puss in Boots	Paramount Pictures / DreamWorks Animation	$7,267,168
6.	Pirates of the Caribbean: On Stranger Tides	Walt Disney Pictures	$6,569,664
7.	Fast Five	Universal Pictures	$6,472,460
8.	The Twilight Saga: Breaking Dawn – Part 1	Summit Entertainment	$4,769,360
9.	Cars 2	Walt Disney Pictures / Pixar Animation Studios	$4,570,943
10.	Zookeeper	Columbia Pictures / MGM	$4,018,127
