= State of Play (soundtrack) =

State Of Play (Original Motion Picture Soundtrack)

Film score by Alex Heffes
- Released: April 14, 2009
- Recorded: 2009
- Genre: Film score
- Length: 39:47
- Label: Back Lot Music
- Producer: Alex Heffes

Alex Heffes chronology
My Enemy's Enemy (2007)	State of Play (2009)	Jasim (2009)

State of Play (Original Motion Picture Soundtrack) is the film score to the 2009 film State of Play directed by Kevin Macdonald, starring Russell Crowe and Ben Affleck. The film score is composed by Alex Heffes and released through Back Lot Music on April 14, 2009.

== Background ==
Alex Heffes, who provided the music for Macdonald's One Day in September (1999), Touching the Void (2003) and The Last King of Scotland (2006) scored the film. It was recorded in the United Kingdom. Heffes indicated that he preferred scoring around the dialogue rather than through it. As with recording his previous works, Heffes conducted the orchestra himself to enable re-scoring as the recording session proceeded. Macdonald involved moon early on in production, and in an unusual move for a studio film, he had Heffes write some of the music to State of Play in advance of principal photography, based purely upon the script. Heffes said this was to provide a hint about the direction the film would take. He said that he and Macdonald had decided to take the score down an unusual path, "off the beaten track", and that the prospect was a "liberating" one. Grammy Award-winning record producer Flood (a.k.a. Mark Ellis) worked with Heffes on the score. Heffes said that working with Flood "opened his mind" and that they attempted to push boundaries. He said that in producing the score, Flood brought an aesthetic to recording the instruments atypical for film recording sessions.

The song played during the end credits is John Fogerty's "Long As I Can See the Light" performed by Creedence Clearwater Revival.

== Track listing ==
No.	Title	Length
1.	"Opening Title / The Ballad of Sonia"	2:23
2.	"The Apartment"	2:58
3.	"Cal Connects the Evidence"	4:34
4.	"Research"	4:36
5.	"Conspiracy at the Highest Level"	5:52
6.	"The Americana Hotel"	4:00
7.	"A Political Suicide"	3:32
8.	"The Cab Ride Home"	4:34
9.	"Steven and Cal"	4:38
10.	"Writing the Article"	2:40
Total length:		39:47

== Reception ==
Christopher Orr of The Atlantic considered the score to be a memorable element, though not in a good way. He recalled Heffes' preference on scoring the film through the dialogue, thereby filling "the aural space to the brim with throbbing beats and jangling strings" declaring suspense and "the effect is no less displacing." Mark Taylor-Canfield of The Seattle Star noted that Heffes' score was "especially effective during intense scene build ups and at moments of tension, suspense or transition" working with the visuals and editing style and thus "enhance the moodiness of the script".

Todd McCarthy of Variety called it a "quietly pulsing score". A. O. Scott of The New York Times described the score as "captivating". Daniel Carlson of Pajiba wrote "the score by Alex Heffes is the kind of purposeful but generic tonal throbbing that would be at home in any basic action movie."

== Accolades ==
Award	Category	Recipient(s) and nominee(s)	Result	Ref.
ASCAP Film and Television Music Awards	Top Box Office Films	Alex Heffes	Won	
International Film Music Critics Association	Best Original Score for a Drama Film	Alex Heffes	Nominated	
