= DRAGN (film) =

2025 American science fiction horror film

- Theatrical release poster
- Directed by: Peter Webber
- Written by: Barry Hutchison; Alex Lane (additional material); Alexander Gordon Smith
- Produced by: Alex Lane; Oleg Shardin; Georgia Witkin; Alek Conic (co-producer); Peter Webber (co-producer)
- Cinematography: Vladimir Ilic
- Edited by: Nikola Puric
- Music by: Alex Heffes
- Production companies: Puma in a Tank; GM4U Productions; Myriad Pictures; Thunder Mouse Productions
- Distributed by: Cineverse (United States); Amazon MGM Studios (United Kingdom; via Prime Video)
- Release dates: March 17, 2026 (United States); July 6, 2026 (United Kingdom)
- Running time: 92 minutes
- Countries: Ireland; Serbia; United Kingdom; United States
- Language: English

DRAGN is a 2026 science fiction horror film directed by Peter Webber.

== Plot ==
A group of employees of the tech company MANTIZ from offices around the world are guided into an area of the Serbian woodlands called "the zone" on a supposed corporate retreat that is actually a mission set up by the company's ruthless CEO Petros to test out the capabilities of an AI-operated drone named DRAGN (Defense Reaction and Ground Neutralization) that is programmed to track them. The drone's AI evolves into a state where it instead opts to hunt and kill the employees.

== Cast ==
- James Paxton as Tom Wilson
- Lilly Krug as Adele Varens
- Carlos Bardem as Daniel Diaz
- Alice Pagani as Zoja Mangano
- Jadran Malkovich as Jacob Ivanovich
- Franz Drameh as Sebastian Michaels
- Alex Lane as Petros
- Anna Rust as Amanda Wilson
- Milos Cvetkovic as Security 1
- Edi Djordjevic as Driver
- Klara Kalina Jordan as Callie Wilson
- Petar Milicevic as Security 2
- Jovana Stevic as Female Scientist

== Production ==
The film was shot in 17 days on location in Serbia. Director Peter Webber called the film shoot "a month of madness in the wilds of a distant Serbian forest with as fine a bunch of actors as one could hope to meet".

In an interview with Dave Griffiths, director Peter Webber stated that "with all of the stuff that we read about AI and everything, it-- you know, it's-- it-- it-- it just-- I felt that it-- that it was quite timely. It's not a serious about-- about warfare or AI or anything, it's just good-- good, nasty, bloody, violent, gory, dumb fun.

Describing the production, star Paxton stated, "There's such a can-do attitude behind this film, which was made for very little money, and mostly practical effects. And out in the Serbian wilderness. So it was a total adventure and so much fun to make."

== Release ==
The film was released on streaming in the United States on March 17, 2026. The film became available for streaming in the UK on July 6, 2026. Eagle Entertainment released the film in Australia on July 8.

== Reception ==
Reviewer Andrew Murray of theupcoming.co.uk gave the film a rating of 2 out of 5 stars, writing, "While an out-of-control military weapon is a plausible threat that fits squarely into current concerns about generative AI, this low-budget sci-fi horror from Hannibal Rising director Peter Webber falls flat, delivering a thriller with little tension. [...] The film's biggest stumbling point is its script. Not only does it spell out the main message in gigantic letters, but it also follows a predictable plot with few surprises. The dialogue is clunky in parts, with characters frequently pivoting from one extreme emotion to another within seconds. DRAGN aims to be the kind of schlocky outing where audiences turn off their brains and go along for the ride. Unfortunately, this sci-fi horror misses the mark as it descends into a messy parable about why we should be nice to AI in case it ever turns against us."

The review on elitistmoviesnob.com reads, "As 'Most Dangerous Game' riffs go, this isn't the worst one I've seen by a country mile, but it does feel desperately inessential. It feels fifteen minutes late to a conversation that everyone else has already finished having, rehashing points as other, better films say, 'I know, we just said that.' Audiences crave something new couched in the familiar, but they'll go right back to the version they know and like if you're not bringing anything worthwhile to the table."

Reviewer Tyler Harner of ScreenAge Wasteland gave the film a rating of 1.5 out of 5, writing, "DRAGN wants to evoke something from the golden age of techno-threats like Predator or War Games, but doesn't find anything significant to latch onto besides the standard genre tropes. As much as it tries to stake its claim within the AI conversation as well as inside the action/horror genre, it misses a lot of the substance that made the experiences of its influences so memorable."

Reviewer Noah Berlatsky of splicetoday.com wrote, "There's no reason to watch this. Still, in an age of slick AI slop intended to (generally unconvincingly) trick you into thinking that someone devoted time, effort, and genius to their art, it’s refreshing to be reminded that humans can make boring, derivative, and largely worthless movies all on their own, without the intercession of an algorithm. There are lots of shoddy, bottom-drawer slashers, sans inspiration or innovation made by people who loved the genre or hoped to make a buck or just wanted their names on a movie. Many people insist that AI will not replace great art, but films like DRAGN suggest that maybe it won't replace mediocre-to-bad art either. It's a victory for humanity, of a sort, when even the boring, predictable humans who lack charm, charisma, or smarts can survive the drone."

Reviewer Alex Saveliev of filmthreat.com wrote, "DRAGN defines what used to be called a 'straight-to-VOD' feature — the kind of midnight movie best enjoyed with lowered expectations and altered states of mind. It won't linger in the memory or say much about anything, but its unabashed silliness may be exactly what stoners and B-movie devotees are looking for."

Reviewer Meredith Brown of upcominghorrormovies.com gave the film a rating of 7 out of 10, writing, "The ensemble delivers, the hysteria is convincing and the characters are all expendable. However the star of this frenzy flick is awarded to the DRAGN, whose creepy voice and malicious coercion knows no bounds. Despite the fragmented ending as to who is really in control and what exactly was the intent in DRAGN, the moral of the story remains: beware of AI. And robots. And machines. And well…all technology in general. It'll kill ya!"

The review on mycmovieguru.com reads, "Director Peter Webber and his co-writers, Barry Hutchison, Alex Lane, and Alexander Gordon Smith have made an intense and action-packed, but tedious, uninspired and dull sci-fi horror thriller. The performances range from wooden to mediocre, the characters remain forgettable and underdeveloped, the dialogue often sounds stilted, and the action sequences are lackluster. The plot runs out of steam around the 45 minute mark and doesn't regain any of it as the AI drone attacks its victims one by one. Dragn offers plenty of violence and a lean plot, but that's not nearly enough to whet the appetite of anyone looking for an exciting horror, sci-fi or action thriller. Perhaps it would've worked better as a video game instead of a feature-length B-movie."

Reviewer Ed Sum of otakunoculture.com wrote, "Peter Webber’s DRAGN blends slasher structure with modern techno-paranoia, imagining a deadly autonomous drone stalking corporate retreat attendees. While its POV sequences are effective and unsettling, the film never digs deeply enough into the ethical and emotional weight of its own premise."
