= List of awards and nominations received by Naomie Harris =

Naomie Harris awards and nominations
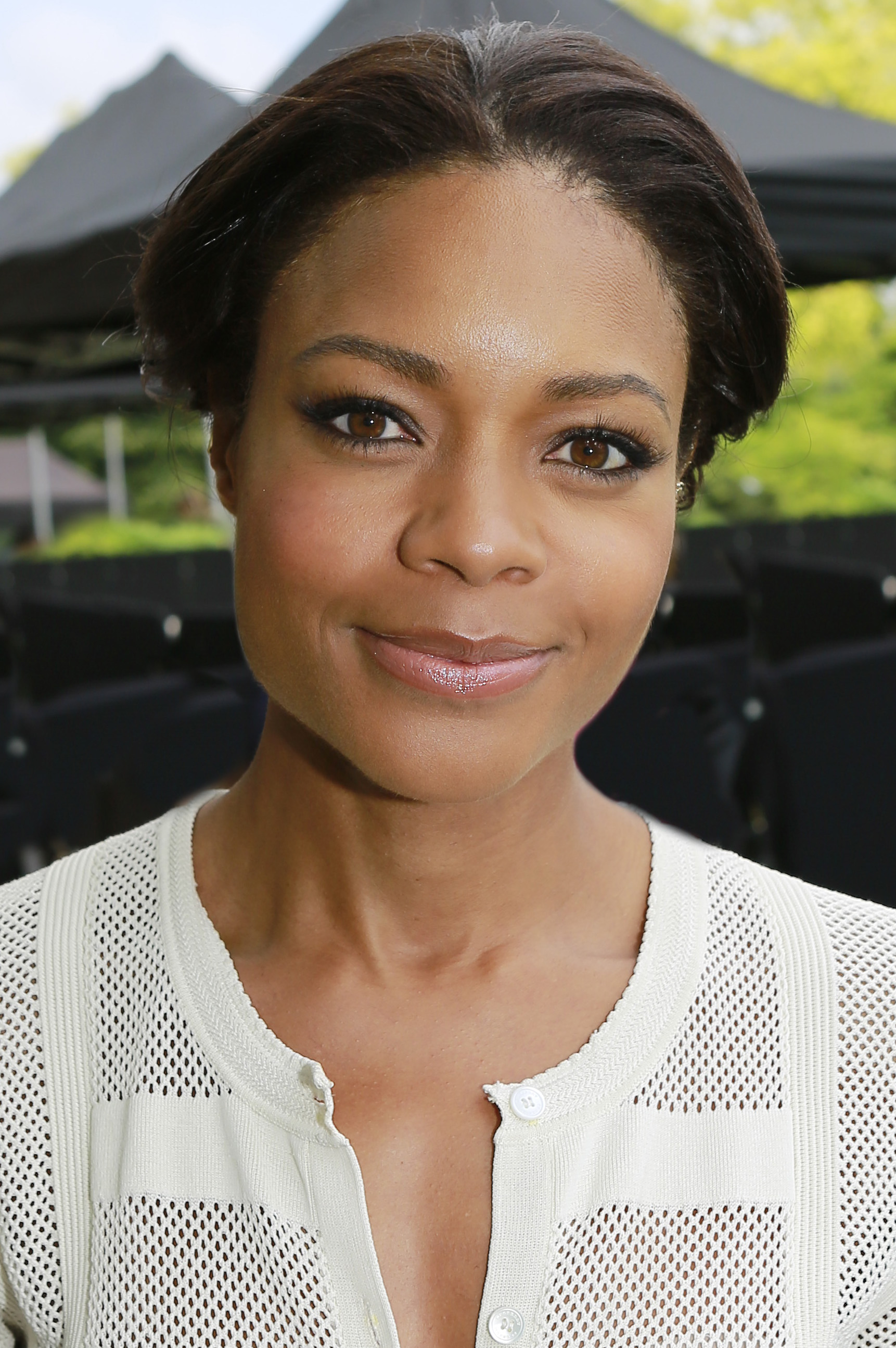
- Harris in 2014
Awards and nominations
| Award | Wins | Nominations |
| Golden Globe | 0 | 1 |
| Academy Awards | 0 | 1 |
| BAFTA Awards | 0 | 2 |
| Screen Actors Guild Awards | 0 | 2 |

This is a list of awards and nominations received by English actress Naomie Harris.

== Major associations ==
=== Academy Awards ===
| Year | Nominated work | Category | Result | Ref. |
|---|---|---|---|---|
| 2016 | Moonlight | Best Supporting Actress | Nominated | |

=== BAFTA Awards ===
| Year | Nominated work | Category | Result | Ref. |
|---|---|---|---|---|
| 2006 | —N/a | Rising Star Award | Nominated | |
| 2016 | Moonlight | Best Actress in a Supporting Role | Nominated | |

=== Golden Globe Awards ===
| Year | Nominated work | Category | Result | Ref. |
|---|---|---|---|---|
| 2016 | Moonlight | Best Supporting Actress – Motion Picture | Nominated | |

=== Screen Actors Guild Awards ===
| Year | Nominated work | Category | Result | Ref. |
|---|---|---|---|---|
| 2016 | Moonlight | Outstanding Performance by a Cast in a Motion Picture | Nominated | |
| 2016 | Moonlight | Outstanding Performance by a Female Actor in a Supporting Role | Nominated | |

== Other awards and nominations ==
=== Black Reel Awards ===
| Year | Nominated work | Category | Result | Ref. |
|---|---|---|---|---|
| 2004 | 28 Days Later | Best Breakthrough Performance | Won | |
| 2012 | The First Grader | Best Actress | Nominated | |
| 2017 | Moonlight | Best Supporting Actress | Nominated | |

=== British Independent Film Awards ===
| Year | Nominated work | Category | Result | Ref. |
|---|---|---|---|---|
| 2016 | Our Kind of Traitor | Best Supporting Actress | Nominated | |
| 2016 | Moonlight, Our Kind of Traitor and Collateral Beauty | The Variety Award | Won | |

=== Critics' Choice Movie Awards ===
| Year | Nominated work | Category | Result | Ref. |
|---|---|---|---|---|
| 2016 | Moonlight | Best Acting Ensemble | Won | |
| 2016 | Moonlight | Best Supporting Actress | Nominated | |

=== Essence Awards ===
| Year | Nominated work | Category | Result | Ref. |
|---|---|---|---|---|
| 2012 | Skyfall | Shining Star Award | Won | |

=== Glamour Awards ===
| Year | Nominated work | Category | Result | Ref. |
|---|---|---|---|---|
| 2011 | Frankenstein | Theatre Actress of the Year | Won | |

=== Gotham Independent Film Awards ===
| Year | Nominated work | Category | Result | Ref. |
|---|---|---|---|---|
| 2016 | Moonlight | Special Jury Award – Ensemble Performance | Won | |

=== Golden Nymph ===
| Year | Nominated work | Category | Result | Ref. |
|---|---|---|---|---|
| 2002 | White Teeth | Best Performance by an Actress | Nominated | |

=== Golden Raspberry Awards ===
| Year | Nominated work | Category | Result | Ref. |
|---|---|---|---|---|
| 2016 | Collateral Beauty | Worst Screen Combo | Nominated | |

=== Hollywood Film Awards ===
| Year | Nominated work | Category | Result | Ref. |
|---|---|---|---|---|
| 2016 | Collateral Beauty and Moonlight | Breakout Actress | Won | |

=== Independent Spirit Awards ===
| Year | Nominated work | Category | Result | Ref. |
|---|---|---|---|---|
| 2016 | Moonlight | Robert Altman Award | Won | |

=== London Film Critics Circle Awards ===
| Year | Nominated work | Category | Result | Ref. |
|---|---|---|---|---|
| 2013 | Mandela: Long Walk to Freedom | Best Supporting Actress | Nominated | |
| 2013 | Mandela: Long Walk to Freedom | British Actress of the Year | Nominated | |

=== NAACP Awards ===
| Year | Nominated work | Category | Result | Ref. |
|---|---|---|---|---|
| 2013 | Mandela: Long Walk to Freedom | Best Supporting Actress | Nominated | |

=== National Board of Review ===
| Year | Nominated work | Category | Result | Ref. |
|---|---|---|---|---|
| 2016 | Moonlight | Best Supporting Actress | Won | |

=== Satellite Awards ===
| Year | Nominated work | Category | Result | Ref. |
|---|---|---|---|---|
| 2009 | Small Island | Best Actress in a Miniseries | Nominated | |
| 2016 | Moonlight | Best Supporting Actress in a Motion Picture | Won | |

=== Washington DC Film Critics Association Awards ===
| Year | Nominated work | Category | Result | Ref. |
|---|---|---|---|---|
| 2016 | Moonlight | Best Supporting Actress | Nominated | |
