= Kimani Maruge =

Oldest primary school pupil

Kimani Ng'ang'a Marūge (c. 1920 – September 14, 2009) was a Kenyan man who held the Guinness World Record for being the oldest person to leave primary school, having enrolled on January 12, 2004, aged 84. Although he had no papers to prove his age, Marūge believed he was born in 1920.

Marūge attended Kapkenduiywo Primary School in Eldoret, Kenya. He said that the government's announcement of universal and free primary school education in 2003 prompted him to enroll.

In 2005 Marūge, who was a model student, was elected head boy of his school. He was handed the responsibility to orient and nurture the students in the school.

In September 2005, Marūge boarded a plane for the first time in his life. He was headed to New York City to address the United Nations 2005 World Summit on the importance of free primary and secondary education for all.

== Final years ==
Marūge's property was stolen by looters during the 2007–2008 post-election violence, and he contemplated quitting school. During early 2008 he lived in a refugee camp, where he was reportedly a minor celebrity, four kilometers from his school, but still attended classes every day. In June 2008, he relocated to the capital Nairobi.

In June 2008, Marūge was forced to withdraw from school and relocate to a retirement home for senior citizens. However, soon after, on June 10, 2008, Marūge enrolled once again into Standard 6 at the Marura primary school, located in the Kariobangi area of Nairobi.

== Film ==
A feature film about Kimani Marūge starring Oliver Litondo and Naomie Harris titled The First Grader was released on May 13, 2011. The British-produced film was shot in the Rift Valley in Kenya.

== Baptism ==
On Sunday May 24, 2009, Marūge was baptized at Holy Trinity Catholic Church in Kariobangi and took the Christian name Stephen, in honor of St. Stephen.

Marūge was then using a wheelchair.

Marūge was a widower, and a great-grandfather (two of his 30 grandchildren attend the same school and helped him study for his finals). He was a fighter in the Mau Mau Uprising against the British colonizers in the 1950s.

== Death ==
Marūge died on August 14, 2009, of stomach cancer, at the Kenyatta National Hospital in Nairobi. He was buried at his farm in Subukia.

== Google Doodle ==
On 19 January 2015, on the 11th anniversary of his first day of school, Google's homepage Google Doodle was about Kimani Marūge.
