= World Soundtrack Award for Discovery of the Year =

Annual Belgian music award

Discovery of the Year is an award handed out yearly at the World Soundtrack Awards to commemorate an excellent piece of musical work in the field of TV and movie soundtracks that seemed to come out of nowhere, hence the title of the award. It has been handed out since the World Soundtrack Awards' debut in 2001. The category sometimes has multiple nominees and sometimes does not.

== Winners and nominees ==
=== 2000s ===
==== 2001 ====
- Moulin Rouge! and Kiss of the Dragon – Craig Armstrong
  - Beck - "Hämndens pris" – Adam Nordén
  - Ftina tsigara – Panayotis Kalantzopoulos
  - The Man Who Cried – Osvaldo Golijov
  - Pollock – Jeff Beal
  - Wo hu cang long – Tan Dun

==== 2002 ====
- The Time Machine – Klaus Badelt
  - Thunderpants – Rupert Gregson-Williams
  - Lagaan – A.R. Rahman
  - Frailty – Brian Tyler
  - Minoes – Peter Vermeersch

==== 2003 ====
- Cidade de Deus – Antonio Pinto
  - Children of Dune – Brian Tyler
  - One Hour Photo – Reinhold Heil & Johnny Klimek
  - Les Triplettes de Belleville– Benoit Charest

==== 2004 ====
- 21 Grams – Gustavo Santaolalla
  - Chasing Liberty and Les Fils du vent – Christian Henson
  - Eternal Sunshine of the Spotless Mind – Jon Brion
  - Master and Commander: The Far Side of the World – Iva Davies, Christopher Gordon & Richard Tognetti
  - La Puta y la ballena – Daniel Tarrab & Andrés Goldstein

==== 2005 ====
- The Incredibles – Michael Giacchino
  - Dear Wendy – Benjamin Wallfisch
  - Deuda – Andrés Goldstein & Daniel Tarrab
  - Layer Cake – Ilan Eshkeri
  - The Syrian Bride – Cyril Morin

==== 2006 ====
- Babam Ve Oglum – Evanthia Reboutsika
  - Les Brigades du Tigre – Olivier Florio
  - Monster House – Douglas Pipes
  - The Proposition – Nick Cave & Warren Ellis
  - The Thief Lord – Nigel Clarke & Michael Csányi-Wills

==== 2007 ====
- XXY & Inheritance – Daniel Tarrab & Andrés Goldstein
  - Harry Potter and the Order of the Phoenix – Nicholas Hooper
  - Mr. Brooks – Ramin Djawadi
  - The Science of Sleep – Jean Michel Bernard
  - La Tourneuse de Pages – Jerome Lemonnier

==== 2008 ====
- American Gangster – Marc Streitenfeld
  - Aanrijding in Moscou – Tuur Florizoone
  - Before the Rains – Mark Kilian
  - The Escapist – Benjamin Wallfisch
  - El Orfanato – Velásquez Fernando

==== 2009 ====
- The Reader – Nico Muhly
  - Babylon A.D. – Atli Örvarsson
  - Crying with Laughter – Lorne Balfe
  - Demain dès l'aube – Jérôme Lemonnier
  - Journey to the Center of the Earth – Andrew Lockington

=== 2010s ===
==== 2010 ====
- A Single Man – Abel Korzeniowski
  - Skin – Hélène Muddiman
  - The Book of Eli – Atticus Ross, Claudia Sarne, and Leopold Ross
  - District 9 – Clinton Shorter
  - The Last Station – Sergey Yevtushenko

==== 2011 ====
- The First Grader and The Rite – Alex Heffes
  - Limitless – Paul Leonard-Morgan
  - Natural Selection and Hamill – iZLER
  - Hanna – The Chemical Brothers (Ed Simons and Tom Rowlands)
  - X-Men: First Class and Gulliver's Travels – Henry Jackman

==== 2012 ====
- Albert Nobbs – Brian Byrne
  - Immortals – Trevor Morris
  - Take Shelter – David Wingo
  - Lola Versus & Nobody Walks – Fall On Your Sword
  - The Raven, Sleep Tight & Cold Light of Day – Lucas Vidal

==== 2013 ====
- Beasts of the Southern Wild – Dan Romer & Benh Zeitlin
  - Copperhead – Laurent Eyquem
  - Oblivion – Anthony Gonzalez & Joseph Trapanese
  - Hammer of the Gods & Summer in February – Benjamin Wallfisch
  - The Spectacular Now & The Way Way Back – Rob Simonsen

==== 2014 ====
- Cuban Fury & The Counselor – Daniel Pemberton
  - Calvary – Patrick Cassidy
  - La Chair de Ma Chair & Zum Geburtstag – Jérôme Lemonnier
  - Gravity & The World's End – Steven Price
  - The Young and Prodigious T.S. Spivet – Denis Sanacore

==== 2015 ====
- Birdman – Antonio Sánchez
  - But Always & Highway of Love – Zhiyi Wang
  - Ex Machina – Ben Salisbury & Geoff Barrow (Portishead)
  - A Most Violent Year – Alex Ebert (Edward Sharpe and the Magnetic Zeros)
  - Spooks: The Greater Good – Dominic Lewis

==== 2016 ====
- Mission: Impossible – Rogue Nation – Joe Kraemer
  - 10 Cloverfield Lane & The Boy – Bear McCreary
  - The Big Short – Nicholas Britell
  - Eddie the Eagle – Matthew Margeson
  - Synchronicity – Ben Lovett

==== 2017 ====
- Moonlight – Nicholas Britell
  - Get Out – Michael Abels
  - Lady Macbeth – Dan Jones
  - Lion – Hauschka & Dustin O'Halloran
  - My Cousin Rachel – Rael Jones

==== 2018 ====
- Mudbound – Tamar-kali
  - Nostalgia – Laurent Eyquem
  - Sicario: Day of the Soldado – Hildur Guðnadóttir
  - Girl – Valentin Hadjadj
  - Mary Shelley – Amelia Warner

==== 2019 ====
- Us - Michael Abels
  - The Last Tree – Segun Akinola
  - Green Book – Kris Bowers
  - Where Hands Touch – Anne Chmelewsky
  - Under the Silver Lake – Disasterpeace

=== 2020s ===
==== 2020 ====
- The Two Popes – Bryce Dessner
  - Berlin Alexanderplatz – Dascha Dauenhauer
  - A Shaun the Sheep Movie: Farmageddon – Tom Howe
  - Uncut Gems – Daniel Lopatin
  - The Personal History of David Copperfield – Christopher Willis

==== 2021 ====
- The Reason I Jump – Nainita Desai
  - Wild Indian – Gavin Brivik
  - Calamity – Florencia Di Concilio
  - Infidel – Natalie Holt
  - Promising Young Woman – Anthony Willis

==== 2022 ====
- Drive My Car – Eiko Ishibashi
  - Pleasure – Karl Frid
  - Everything Everywhere All at Once – Son Lux
  - Coppelia – Maurizio Malagnini
  - The Edge of War – Isobel Waller-Bridge

==== 2023 ====
- Avatar: The Way of Water – Simon Franglen
  - Golda – Dascha Dauenhauer
  - Suzume – RADWIMPS / Kazuma Jinnouchi
  - Knock at the Cabin – Herdís Stefánsdóttir
  - The Menu – Colin Stetson

==== 2024 ====
- Poor Things – Jerskin Fendrix
  - In the Land of Saints and Sinners – Diego Baldenweg with Nora Baldenweg and Lionel Baldenweg
  - Ezra – Carlos Rafael Rivera
  - Julie Keeps Quiet (Julie zwijgt) – Caroline Shaw
  - Saltburn – Anthony Wills

==== 2025 ====
- The Brutalist – Daniel Blumberg
  - Nosferatu – Robin Carolan
  - Mickey 17 – Jung Jae-il
  - Mufasa: The Lion King – Dave Metzger
  - Sentimental Value – Hania Rani

==== 2026 ====
- Midwinter Break – Hannah Peel
  - 2000 Meters to Andriivka – Sam Slater
  - The Chronology of Water – Paris Hurley
  - Little Amélie or the Character of Rain – Mari Fukuhara
  - Sirāt – Kangding Ray

== See also ==
- Academy Award for Best Original Score
- Cannes Soundtrack Award
