= Inna de Yard: The Soul of Jamaica =

2019 American music documentary film

Inna De Yard: The Soul of Jamaica
- Film poster
- Directed by: Peter Webber
- Written by: Peter Webber
- Produced by: Laurent Baudens; Laurent Flahault; Yann Legay; Gaël Nouaille
- Starring: Ken Boothe; Kiddus I; Jah9; Winston McAnuff; Judy Mowatt; Cedric Myton; Lloyd Parks
- Cinematography: Bernard Benant
- Edited by: Giles Gardner
- Production company: Borsalino Films
- Release date: 29 April 2019 (Tribeca Film Festival)
- Running time: 99 minutes
- Language: English

Inna De Yard: The Soul of Jamaica is a 2019 music documentary film about Jamaican reggae music, written and directed by Peter Webber. The film is based around the recording of an album in Kingston, Jamaica by Jamaican reggae music veterans. It also "doubles as a capsule history of Jamaican reggae" and shows the band performing the songs at a concert at Le Trianon in Paris.

The musical supergroup, a project also called Inna De Yard, is shown collaborating on recording an acoustic album of old songs by each of the musicians, in Saint Andrew Parish in 2017.

Inna De Yard had its world premiere at Tribeca Film Festival in 2019. It showed at Sydney Film Festival the same year. As of October 2021, 94% of the 17 reviews compiled on Rotten Tomatoes are positive, with an average rating of 7.1/10.

== Cast ==
- Ken Boothe
- Kiddus I
- Jah9
- Winston McAnuff
- Judy Mowatt
- Cedric Myton of The Congos
- Lloyd Parks
- Derajah

== Songs ==
- "Everything I Own" with Ken Boothe

== See also ==
- Music of Jamaica
