= My Cousin Rachel (soundtrack) =

2017 film soundtrack album

My Cousin Rachel (Original Motion Picture Soundtrack)

Film score by Rael Jones
- Released: June 2, 2017
- Recorded: 2017
- Genre: Film score
- Length: 49:57
- Label: Sony Masterworks
- Producer: Rael Jones

Rael Jones chronology
Harlots season 1 (2017)	My Cousin Rachel (2017)	Ill Behaviour (2017)

My Cousin Rachel (Original Motion Picture Soundtrack) is the film score composed by Rael Jones to the 2017 film My Cousin Rachel directed by Roger Michell. The film score was released through Sony Masterworks on June 2, 2017, a week prior to the film's release.

== Background ==
Rael Jones, who previously worked as a music editor on Mitchell's Hyde Park on Hudson (2012) was assigned to score for My Cousin Rachel after presenting the initial themes which the director liked. Jones considered the central challenge to be Rachel's inscrutiable nature which led him to have an ambiguous and even-handed approach to Rachel, in contrast to Philip, which had a straight forward approach. The score primarily emphasizes strings, harmonies and piano, serving as a crucial tool for invoking psychological and emotional side of the film. Mitchell praised Jones for building the suspense through music. Most of the piano themes that Jones had written were served as temp tracks in the edit and kept unchanged.

== Release ==
The soundtrack was released through Sony Masterworks on June 2, 2017.

== Reception ==
Jonathan Broxton of Movie Music UK wrote "Some may find Jones's singular tone for My Cousin Rachel to be overly downbeat and depressing, some may find that the lack of a strong main theme results in it sounding a little anonymous, and others may find the adherence to strict classical form a little staid, but I personally enjoyed it quite a lot. It's a difficult thing, finding that right balance between tone and tempo, maintaining the atmosphere you're wanting to convey, while still making the score musically compelling. Personally, I found that Jones allows himself just enough room to be impressive, compositionally and emotionally, without sacrificing the overarching mood of veiled dread that permeates the entire film. Not only that, at under an hour, the soundtrack album never outstays its welcome, allowing the listener to luxuriate in the score's bed of brooding melancholy before it becomes too much. This is, on the whole, impressive stuff, and I look forward to seeing where this talented composer goes from here." Pete Simons of Synchrotones wrote "whilst My Cousin Rachel feels quite familiar, it is an expertly executed score. I look forward to seeing how Rael Jones' career progresses from here."

Peter Bradshaw of The Guardian called it a "lush score from Rael Jones". Fionnuala Halligan of Screen International called it a "firmly directional score". Peter Debruge of Variety called it a "hypnotically repetitive piano score". Sheri Linden of The Hollywood Reporter wrote "Rael Jones' judiciously used score balances romance and foreboding". Trevor Dueck of Daily Hive called it a "powerful piano score". James Croot of Stuff called it an "atmospheric score". However, Glenn Kenny of RogerEbert.com wrote "From the moment it opens, it's constantly indicating menace and heightened emotion, but never doing anything to genuinely evoke it. Rael Jones' music is the main culprit here".

== Track listing ==
No.	Title	Length
1.	"Who's to Blame"	2:05
2.	"Memory of a Happy Day"	1:28
3.	"Headaches Blind Me"	1:57
4.	"By the Throat"	2:01
5.	"Clean Up"	1:50
6.	"Happy Day"	1:52
7.	"Christmas"	2:00
8.	"Tisane"	0:48
9.	"Signing"	1:35
10.	"I Will Not Permit It"	1:40
11.	"First Kiss"	1:32
12.	"Vine Climb"	0:40
13.	"Laying in Bluebells"	2:19
14.	"You Belong Here"	1:56
15.	"Broken Pearls"	2:12
16.	"What I Lack"	3:59
17.	"Cliff Path"	0:48
18.	"Muggins"	1:46
19.	"Hallucinations"	1:16
20.	"Laburnum"	2:28
21.	"Follow That Horse"	1:36
22.	"Enlightenment"	2:43
23.	"Gallop to the Coast"	3:40
24.	"Who's to Blame – Reprise"	1:49
25.	"Suspicion"	1:29
26.	"My Torment"	2:27
Total length:		49:56

== Personnel ==
Credits adapted from liner notes:

- Composer and producer – Rael Jones
- Additional music – Jeremy Sams
- Conductor – Anthony Weeden
- Orchestrators – Anthony Weeden, Rael Jones
- Orchestra leader – Jonathan Morton
- Orchestra contractor – Hilary Skewes
- Recordist – Laurence Anslow
- Recording and mixing – Jake Jackson
- Mastering – John Webber
- Music editor – Al Green
- Music supervisor – Anton Monsted, Areli Quirarte
- Soundtrack coordination – Joann Orgel
- Music production supervisor – Rebecca Morellato
- Executive in charge of music – Danielle Diego
- Music business affairs – Tom Cavanaugh
- Music clearance – Ellen Ginsburg
- Licensing – Mark Cavell
- Product development – Klara Korytowska

== Accolades ==
Award	Date of ceremony	Category	Recipient(s)	Result	Ref.
World Soundtrack Awards	October 17, 2018	Discovery of the Year	Rael Jones	Nominated	
