= Rael Jones =

English composer and multi-instrumentalist

- Born: London, England
- Genres: Film score; classical; pop; alternative
- Occupations: Composer; multi-instrumentalist
- Instruments: Piano; guitar; percussion; drums
- Years active: 2008–present
- Label: Believers Roast
- Member of: Thumpermonkey
- Website: raeljones.com

Rael Jones is an English composer and multi-instrumentalist. He is best known for scoring Mrs. Harris Goes to Paris, My Cousin Rachel, Suite Française and Harlots.

== Career ==
Jones graduated in Music and Sound Recording from the Tonmeister course at the University of Surrey in 2004. He collaborated with director Mat Whitecross in Oasis: Supersonic and Coldplay: A Head Full of Dreams.

== Selected filmography ==
=== Film ===
- 2024 : Seize Them!
- 2024 : Role Play
- 2024 : Mad About the Boy: The Noel Coward Story
- 2022 : Mrs. Harris Goes to Paris
- 2021 : The Toll
- 2021 : Shoplifters of the World
- 2018 : The Festival
- 2018 : Coldplay: A Head Full of Dreams
- 2017 : My Cousin Rachel
- 2016 : Oasis: Supersonic
- 2016 : Kids in Love
- 2014 : Suite Française
- 2010 : Dazed in Doon

=== Television ===
- 2025 : This City Is Ours
- 2024 : My Lady Jane
- 2023 : The Sixth Commandment
- 2022 : Ten Percent
- 2020 : The Salisbury Poisonings
- 2017-2019 : Harlots
- 2018 : Hang Ups
- 2017 : Ill Behaviour
- 2016 : NW (novel)

== Discography ==
- 2020 : Mother Echo
- 2018 : Make Me Young, etc EP with Thumpermonkey
- 2015 : The Watched Clock EP with Peter Gregson
- 2013 : Mandrake

== Awards and nominations ==
Year	Result	Award	Category	Work	Ref.
2017	Nominated	Primetime Emmy Awards	Outstanding Music Composition for a Limited or Anthology Series, Movie or Special	"Suite Française"	
2017	Nominated	Primetime Emmy Awards	Outstanding Sound Editing for a Limited or Anthology Series, Movie or Special	Sherlock: The Lying Detective	
2017	Nominated	World Soundtrack Awards	Discovery of the Year	My Cousin Rachel	
2016	Nominated	Primetime Emmy Awards	Outstanding Sound Editing for a Limited or Anthology Series, Movie or Special	Sherlock: The Abominable Bride	
2013	Won	Motion Picture Sound Editors	Outstanding Achievement in Sound Editing – Musical for Feature Film	Les Misérables	
