= Oliver Litondo =

Kenyan actor, journalist and newsreader (born 1948)

- Born: Oliver Musila Litondo; 4 August 1948 (age 78); Kakamega, Kenya
- Citizenship: Kenya
- Education: Harvard University; Stockholm University; University of Iowa
- Occupations: Actor; Journalist; News Anchor
- Known for: The Lion of Africa
- Spouse: Beldina Auma (m. 1997)
- Children: 4
- Awards: AARP Movies for Grownups Award for Best Actor

Oliver Musila Litondo (born August 4, 1948) is a Kenyan actor, journalist and news anchor. He is known for portraying Kimani Maruge in the 2010 biographical film The First Grader. For his portrayal as Maruge, Litondo won the AARP Movies for Grownups Award for Best Actor and the Black Film Critics Circle Award for Best Actor. He was also nominated for the NAACP Image Award for Outstanding Actor in a Motion Picture for his performance in The First Grader.

Litondo's first known role is in Ragbir Singh's Mlevi (The Drunkard) (1968), the first feature length film in Swahili and considered the first locally produced Kenyan feature film. In a 2024 segment on KBC Channel 1 about the history of Kenyan film, Litondo said that he tried unsuccessfully to locate this pioneering film.

Litondo is a graduate of the University of Iowa, Stockholm University and Harvard University. He is married to Beldina Auma, and they have four children. One of their children, Grace Litondo, is a singer. Litondo is a recipient of the Kalasha Lifetime Achievement award.

== Filmography ==
Year	Title	Role	Notes
1968	Mlevi		First Film Made in Kenya
1969	Mrembo		Another Pioneer Film Made in Kenya
1975	The Wilby Conspiracy		Minor role
1980	The Bushtrackers	Johnny Kimathi	Cast
1984	Sheena	Chief Harcomba	Cast
1988	The Lion of Africa	Sergeant	Cast
1990	Ivory Hunters	Kenneth	Cast
2010	The First Grader	Kimani Ng'ang'a Maruge	Cast
2011	The Rugged Priest	Catholic Bishop	Cast
2024	Birthday Live	Daudi	
1971	The Search for the Nile	King Mutesa	Cast, TV series (2 episodes)
1976 - 1977	Orzowei, il Figlio Della Savana	Amunai	Cast, Mini series
1977	The Track of the African Bongo	Njiri	Cast
1977	Disneyland	Njiri	Cast, TV series ( 2 episodes)
2012	The Truth About Priest	Stanley	Cast, Short film
2013	Unforgatable	Okoro Dimka	Cast, TV series (1 episode)
2014	Naku Penta Naku Taka	Vinays Bose	Cast
2022	Country Queen	Prof	Cast, TV series (6 episodes)
2024	Sambaza Furaha Na Safaricom Hii Krisi	Old Wise Man	Cast, Short ad

== Award and nominations ==
Year	Awarding Organization	Category	Nominee	Result	Ref
2012	Image Awards (NAACP)	Outstanding Actor in a Motion Picture	Oliver Litondo	Nominated	
2012	Black Reel Awards	Best Actor	Oliver Litondo	Nominated	
2011	Black Film Critics Circle Awards	Best Actor	Oliver Litondo	Won	
2012	Kalasha Internationa Film and TV Awards	Lifetime Achievement Award	Oliver Litondo	Won	
2012	AARP Movies for Grownups Awards	Best Actor	Oliver Litondo	Won	
