= Mudbound (soundtrack) =

2017 film soundtrack album

Mudbound (Original Motion Picture Soundtrack)

Film score by Tamar-kali and various artists
- Released: November 17, 2017
- Recorded: 2017
- Studio: The Diamond Mine, New York City
- Genre: Film score
- Length: 50:58
- Label: Milan
- Producer: Tamar-kali

Tamar-kali chronology
Mudbound (2017)	Come Sunday (2018)

Singles from Mudbound (Original Motion Picture Soundtrack)
- 1. "Mighty River" Released: November 24, 2017

Mudbound (Original Motion Picture Soundtrack) is the film score composed by Tamar-kali to the 2017 film Mudbound directed by Dee Rees. The album featured Tamar-kali's score along with three original songs performed by the Ek-Stompers and "Mighty River" by Mary J. Blige, which received a nomination for Academy Award for Best Original Song. The album was released on November 17, 2017, through Milan Records.

== Background ==
Singer-songwriter Tamar-kali was chosen to score music for Mudbound, having previously worked with Dee Rees on providing songs for Pariah (2011) and Bessie (2015). Dee Rees was instrumental in bringing Tamar-kali to score for Mudbound, after liking her work in Pariah, and previously wanted her to score music for Bessie, but executives at HBO wanted a seasoned composer which led to the involvement of Rachel Portman. In an interview, Tamar-kali said that the score was representative of the environment that the film was set in – the mud, the oppression – and had planned out the soundscapes after watching the only cue.

Tamar-kali was not only involved in composition, but also in production, orchestration, conducting, recording and mixing as well. She had worked on 40 minutes of the score for four weeks. In an interview, Tamar-kali said that the climax of the film, featured only rough cue, while most of the pieces which she wrote were improvisational, especially on one scene where they took Ronsel to the barn which Tamar-kali was afraid of it, as it was intense and sensitive. Tamar-kali had to watch that sensitive scenes over and over so that she has an emotional reaction to these sequences and then create a gut-wrenching piece for the sequences.

== Reception ==
David Rooney of The Hollywood Reporter wrote "the expressive and distinctively varied score of Brooklyn-based multicultural composer Tamar-kali" aided the film. Peter Debruge of Variety wrote "Tamar-kali’s Dolby-mixed score swells all around". Chris Bumbray of JoBlo.com called Tamar-kali's score as "remarkable". David Ehrlich of IndieWire listed the score as one of the 40 best film scores of the 21st century. Ehrlich said "Moments of levity jump out of the higher registers like flickers escaping a fire, but the music always returns to that low rumble, those strings absorbing all manner of hardship and violence. That consistency only makes Tamar-kali’s final tracks more powerful, as the torture of 'Missing Letter' gives way to the divine transcendence of '…But for Love.'"

== Track listing ==
No.	Title	Artist(s)	Length
1.	"Mighty River"	Mary J. Blige	5:14
2.	"Intro / Mudbound Theme"		3:34
3.	"Laura Mud Drone"		0:43
4.	"Ronsel Leaves"		1:15
5.	"Hap Mud Drone"		0:35
6.	"Land"		1:02
7.	"Country Violence"		1:04
8.	"Whooping Cough Pt. 1"		0:27
9.	"Whooping Cough Pt. 2"		1:45
10.	"Hap Recuperates"		1:47
11.	"Ties That Bind"		0:31
12.	"Lovers / VE Day"		1:30
13.	"Back on the Farm"		1:47
14.	"A Man Oughta Know"		1:22
15.	"Same Old Jim Crow Pt. 1"		0:43
16.	"Same Old Jim Crow Pt. 2"		0:23
17.	"Sorry, Not Sorry"		0:45
18.	"Ties That Bind Pt. 2"		0:40
19.	"Unravelings"		3:29
20.	"Awakenings"		0:32
21.	"The Ties That Bind Pt. 3"		0:53
22.	"Father & Son Undone Pt. 1"		1:11
23.	"Missing Letter"		3:48
24.	"Father & Son Undone Pt. 2"		1:46
25.	"Ronsel in A Minor"		1:28
26.	"...But for Love"		3:06
27.	"Glory Glory"	Odetta	2:12
28.	"Harlem Shout"	The Ek-Stompers	3:08
29.	"(My Darling) It's You, Only You"	The Ek-Stompers	1:35
30.	"Moonray"	The Ek-Stompers	2:43
Total length:			50:58

== Accolades ==
Award	Date of ceremony	Category	Recipient(s)	Result	Ref.
Academy Awards	March 4, 2018	Best Original Song	"Mighty River" – Mary J. Blige, Raphael Saadiq and Taura Stinson	Nominated	
Black Reel Awards	February 22, 2018	Outstanding Original Song	"Mighty River" – Mary J. Blige, Raphael Saadiq and Taura Stinson	Won	
Georgia Film Critics Association	January 12, 2018	Best Original Song	"Mighty River" – Raphael Saadiq, Mary J. Blige and Taura Stinson	Nominated	
Golden Globe Awards	January 7, 2018	Best Original Song	"Mighty River" – Raphael Saadiq, Mary J. Blige and Taura Stinson	Nominated	
Guild of Music Supervisors Awards	February 8, 2018	Best Song Written and/or Recording Created for a Film	"Mighty River"	Nominated	
Hollywood Music in Media Awards	November 16, 2017	Original Score – Feature Film	Tamar-kali	Nominated	
Hollywood Music in Media Awards	November 16, 2017	Original Song – Feature Film	"Mighty River" – Raphael Saadiq, Mary J. Blige and Taura Stinson	Nominated	
World Soundtrack Awards	October 17, 2018	Discovery of the Year	Tamar-kali	Won	
