= Mighty River (song) =

Single by Mary J. Blige

from the album Mudbound
- Released: November 24, 2017
- Genre: R&B
- Length: 5:13
- Label: Milan Records
- Songwriters: Mary J. Blige; Raphael Saadiq; Taura Stinson
- Producers: Raphael Saadiq; Taura Stinson

"Mighty River" is a 2017 song performed by Mary J. Blige. It is co-written by Blige, Taura Stinson and Raphael Saadiq, who also served as a producer and composer along with Taura Stinson. The song was released as a lead single from the soundtrack album of 2017 film Mudbound. "Mighty River" received Academy Award and Golden Globe Award nominations for Best Original Song, making Blige the first person to be nominated for an Academy Award for acting and songwriting in the same year.

== Accolades ==
Award	Category	Result	Ref(s)
90th Academy Awards	Best Original Song	Nominated	
75th Golden Globe Awards	Best Original Song	Nominated	
18th Black Reel Awards	Outstanding Original Song	Won	
2017 Georgia Film Critics Association Awards	Best Original Song	Nominated	
8th Guild of Music Supervisors Awards	Best Song/Recording Created for a Film	Nominated	
2017 Hollywood Music in Media Awards	Original Song — Feature Film	Nominated	
