= Pickpockets (2018 film) =

2018 Colombian film by Peter Webber

- Release poster
- Directed by: Peter Webber
- Written by: Alejandro Fadel; Martín Mauregui
- Produced by: Laurent Baudens; Richard Decaillet; Didar Domehri; Julián Giraldo; Gaël Nouaille; Diana Rico; Peter Webber
- Starring: Carlos Bardem; Carlos Humberto Camacho; Ulises Gonzalez
- Cinematography: Paulo Perez
- Edited by: Sebastian Hernandez
- Music by: Alex Heffes
- Production company: 64A Films
- Distributed by: Netflix
- Release dates: March 3, 2018 (Cartagena International Film Festival); April 12, 2018
- Running time: 108 minutes
- Country: Colombia
- Language: Spanish

Pickpockets (Spanish: Pickpockets: Maestros del robo) is a 2018 Colombian crime-drama film directed by Peter Webber and written by Alejandro Fadel and Martín Mauregui. The plot revolves around how a master in the art of pickpocketing teaches aspiring teen thieves about what it takes to be successful pickpockets on the streets of Bogotá.

== Cast ==
- Carlos Bardem as Chucho
- Carlos Humberto Camacho as El hombre de negro
- Ulises Gonzalez as Jaime
- Marcela Mar as Fresh's mother
- Matthew Moreno as Jhoncito
- Julio Pachón as Rico
- Emiliano Pernía as Fresh
- Dubán Andrés Prado as Doggy
- Carlos Quintero as Alex
- Natalia Reyes as Juana
- Noëlle Schönwald as Tia Hilda
- Sigifredo Vega as Falsificador
- David Velasquez as Maicol

== Release ==
It was released on April 12, 2018, on Netflix streaming.
