= My Enemy's Enemy =

2007 documentary film

- Directed by: Kevin Macdonald
- Cinematography: Jean-Luc Perréard
- Edited by: Nicolas Chaudeurge
- Music by: Alex Heffes
- Production companies: Wild Bunch; Yalla Film
- Distributed by: The Weinstein Company (US)
- Release date: 2007
- Running time: 87 minutes
- Country: United Kingdom
- Language: English

My Enemy's Enemy (Mon Meilleur Ennemi, My best enemy in French) is a documentary film directed by Kevin Macdonald in 2007.

== Synopsis ==
The story of Klaus Barbie through World War II and post-war hiding journey in Bolivia including his involvement in the assassination of Che Guevara before being tried in France for war crimes committed in Lyon and the assassination of Jean Moulin.

== Casting ==
- Raymond Aubrac
- Robert Badinter
- Klaus Barbie
- René Hardy
- Che Guevara
- Beate Klarsfeld
- Serge Klarsfeld
- Jacques Vergès
- Jean Moulin
- Kevin Macdonald, narrator
