= Stephen Emmott =

English scientist

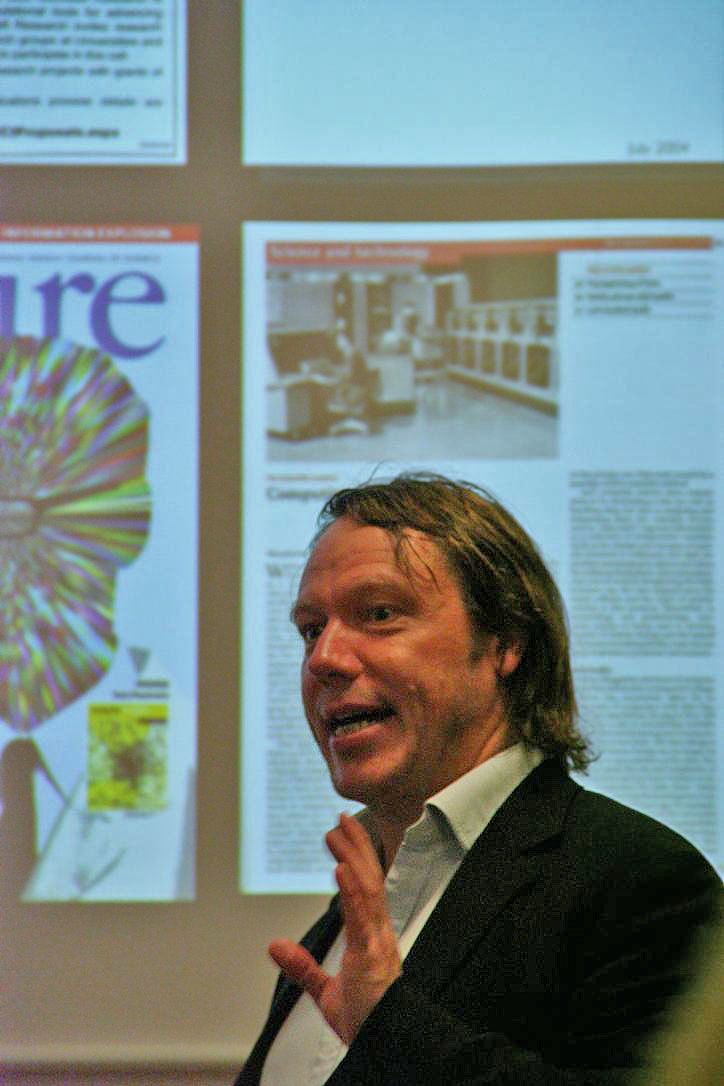
- Stephen Emmott speaking in 2006
- Born: Stephen Emmott; 3 June 1960 (age 66)
- Education: University of York (BSc); University of Stirling (PhD)
- Known for: Microsoft; Ten Billion
- Scientific career
- Fields: Neuroscience; Biological computation Computational science
- Workplaces: Scientific; Microsoft; University College London; AT&T Bell Laboratories; NCR Corporation
- Thesis: The visual processing of text (1993)

Stephen Emmott (born 3 June 1960) is a British scientist, entrepreneur and chief scientist of Scientific. Emmott was named one of London's most influential scientists, and one of the most influential people in London by the Evening Standard in 2012.

== Education ==
Emmott studied at the University of York, where he completed a B.Sc. in Biological Sciences (experimental psychology), graduating in 1987 with First Class honours.

He obtained a PhD in computational neuroscience from the Centre for Cognitive and Computational Neuroscience, University of Stirling in 1993, supervised by Professor Roger Watt. Having been deeply influenced and inspired by the work of David Marr and David Rumelhart, Emmott's doctoral research focused on modelling and understanding the computations the brain performs to produce vision. He chose the visual processing of text because it is the canonical example of a physical structure designed around how the brain works, rather than the other way round.

== Career ==
After obtaining his PhD., Emmott took up a post-doctoral scientist position at AT&T Bell Labs in Holmdel, N.J, US, between 1993 and 1996. He worked in Nobel Laureate Arno Penzias's division, undertaking research into biological-inspired computing, applied to some of the earliest medical, financial and e-commerce applications of the Internet.

Emmott returned to London in January 1997 to lead the advanced research laboratory of NCR Corp (which then owned teradata). His work and the work of his Laboratory became recognised for numerous innovations at the intersection of science, technology and finance. This included the invention of Agent-based Internet auctions, the digital wallet and a biologically-inspired, probabilistic method to predict the behaviour of financial markets.

=== Microsoft ===
In 2003, Emmott joined Microsoft as chief scientist, and head of computational science. Emmott's vision was 'to pioneer new computational methods, tools and technologies to enable new kinds of science and accelerate radical solutions to the unprecedented challenges and opportunities of our time.'

Emmott's scientific leadership created numerous scientific and technological advances. These include the new science of biological computation and 'Living Software'; programmable Artificial Photosynthesis as a potentially breakthrough cheap, global energy technology; the world's first predictive mechanistic model of all life on Earth (General Ecosystem Model); the first mechanistic model of the Global Carbon Cycle; and the development of a computational platform enabling hyper-parallelisation of the Scientific Method (e.g.,).

=== Scientific ===
In 2019, Emmott created Scientific, a science and technology company.

== Public service ==
From 2005 to 2010, Emmott was scientific advisor to the Chancellor of The Exchequer. He was a member of the UK Government's 10 Year Science & Innovation Framework Committee, 2004. He was appointed by the UK government Minister for Science as a trustee of the UK's National Endowment for Science, Technology & the Arts, 2008–2012. He was an adviser to the Finnish Prime Minister's Science & Innovation Strategy, 2008. Emmott is Professor of Biological Computation, University College London, and was Professor of Computational Science (visiting), University of Oxford, 2007–2014.

== Ten Billion ==
Emmott is author of 10 Billion. It is about the climate, ecological, agricultural, resource, pollution, energy, migration and geo-political impact of a human population of 10 Billion.

=== Royal Court ===
10 Billion began as 'a new kind of scientific lecture', delivered by Emmott, over twenty nights at London's Royal Court Theatre, directed by Katie Mitchell. It won widespread critical acclaim. Sarah Hemming of the Financial Times described it as 'immensely, distressingly powerful' and 'one of the most disturbing evenings I've ever spent in a Theatre'. The Guardian's Michael Billington stated that "what is impressive is that Professor Emmott argues his case with an implacable logic. He is quiet, humane and deeply concerned and when he says, at the end, "I think we're fucked" you have to believe him." Ten Billion was named as 'Theatrical Performance of the Year' in 2012 by The Guardian.

=== Book ===
10 Billion was published as a book in 2013.

The Guardian's John Gray concluded that, "The shift in thinking that will be needed if we are to prepare ourselves for living in a different world begins with reading Emmott's indispensable book." Clive Cookson of the Financial Times said the book was "a stark, simple and short warning about the coming catastrophe, which [Emmott] feels is inevitable, resulting from [the living] human population [growing from 7 to 10 billion] and over-exploitation of the world's resources." In a review of 10 Billion in Nature, Hania Zlotnik noted: "His slim, even terse book [presenting] his view on the "unprecedented planetary emergency we've created" — primarily examines the transformation of the global environment by human activity, a transformation that includes climate change, increasing water shortages and growing urbanization. Emmott's assessment of the capacity of people and technology to prevent the global crises that confront us is grim." Kirkus Reviews analyzed the book by highlighting its portrayal of the dire consequences of human overpopulation and environmental degradation, emphasizing Emmott's authoritative background, succinct presentation, and proposed solutions while suggesting the urgency of addressing global environmental crises.

On The Guardian's environment network, Chris Goodall called it "error-strewn, full of careless exaggeration and weak on basic science."

=== Film ===
10 Billion was made into a feature-length documentary film, produced by Oxford Film & Television directed by Peter Webber. It was supported financially by Ingenious Media, Prince Albert II of Monaco Foundation, Sky Atlantic, HanWay Films and the Roland Mouret Foundation. It premiered at London's Curzon Cinema in December 2015 and screened at cinemas worldwide. Subsequently, it premiered on Sky Atlantic in 2016.
