= Jah9 =

Jamaican singer

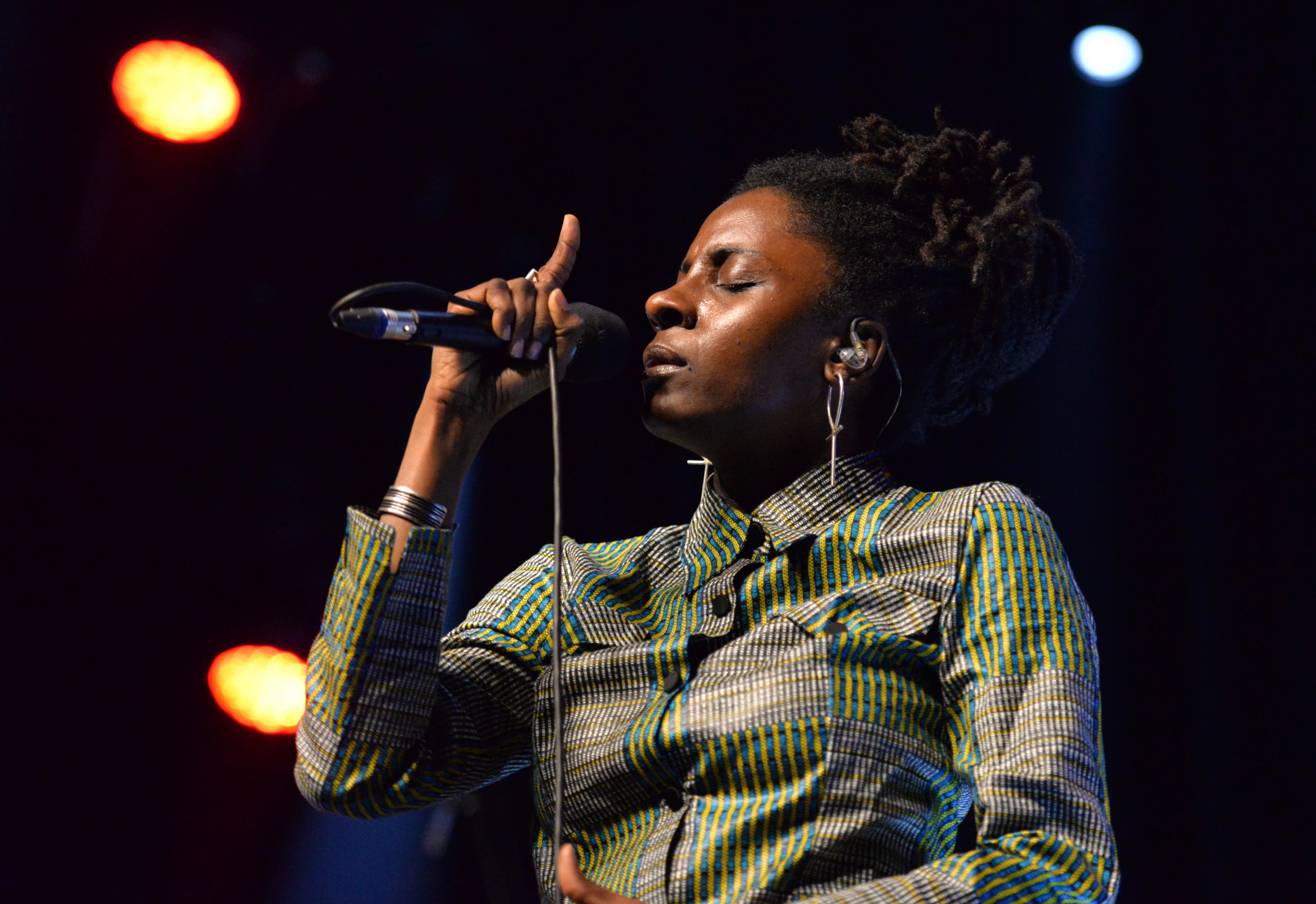
- Jah9 in concert, October 10, 2019, Het Depot Leuven, Belgium

Background information
- Also known as: Janine Elizabeth Cunningham
- Born: 23 May 1983 (age 43)
- Origin: Montego Bay, Jamaica
- Genres: Reggae; Roots reggae Dub
- Occupation: Singer
- Years active: 2011–present
- Label: VP Records
- Website: http://jah9.com

Janine Elizabeth Cunningham (born 23 May 1983), better known as Jah9, is a Jamaican singer and yoga teacher.

== Biography ==
Jah9 was born in Montego Bay in Saint James, Jamaica. Her father was a Baptist minister and her mother was a teacher and social worker. She spent much of her childhood in Falmouth,Trelawny. In 1991, the family moved to Kingston. After a period at university, she commenced singling professionally.

Her music is often described as "jazz on dub", because her singing voice is influenced by Nina Simone and Billie Holiday, partly combined with the dancehall sound of Sizzla and the more potent dub rhythms similar to those of Augustus Pablo. She has recorded three albums for VP Records: New Name (2013), 9 (2016) and Note to Self (2020).

== Discography ==
=== Albums ===
- New Name (2013)
- 9 (2016)
- Mad Professor Meets Jah9 - In The Midst Of The Storm (2017)
- Feelings (2018) (mini-album, vinyl only)
- Note To Self (2020)
