= Naomie Harris =

British actress (born 1976)

Naomie Harris OBE
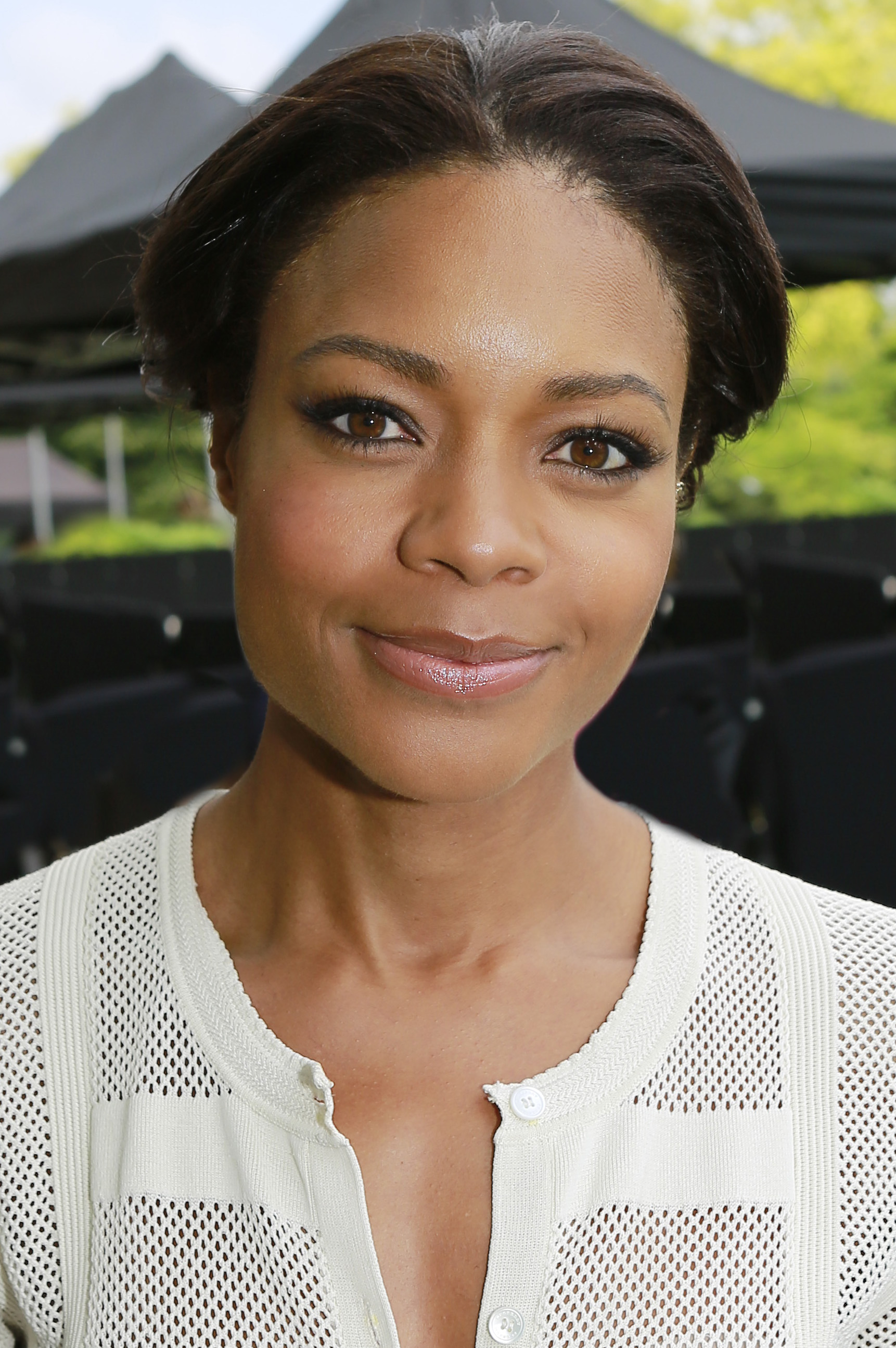
- Harris in 2014
- Born: Naomie Melanie Harris; 6 September 1976 (age 50); London, England
- Education: Pembroke College, Cambridge (BA); Bristol Old Vic Theatre School
- Occupation: Actress
- Years active: 1987–present
- Partner: Peter Legler (2012–present)
- Awards: Full list

Naomie Melanie Harris (born 6 September 1976) is a British actress. She started her career when she was a child, appearing in the television series Simon and the Witch in 1987. In 2016, she starred in the film Moonlight, a performance that earned her a number of accolades, including nominations for the Golden Globe, BAFTA, and Academy Award for Best Supporting Actress. Harris was appointed an Officer of the Order of the British Empire (OBE) in the 2017 New Year Honours for services to drama.

Harris also portrayed Selena in the post-apocalyptic film 28 Days Later (2002), the witch Tia Dalma in the second and third Pirates of the Caribbean films, Winnie Mandela in Mandela: Long Walk to Freedom (2013), and Shriek in Sony's Spider-Man Universe film Venom: Let There Be Carnage (2021). She starred as Eve Moneypenny in the James Bond films: Skyfall (2012), Spectre (2015), and No Time to Die (2021).

== Early life and education ==
Naomie Melanie Harris was born on 6 September 1976 in Islington, London. Her mother Carmen Harris (sometimes credited as Lisselle Kayla), having emigrated from Jamaica to London as a child with her parents, has worked as a screenwriter on EastEnders and as a healer. Harris's fashion designer father Brian Clarke emigrated from Trinidad to the UK, and has British, Grenadian, and Guyanese ancestors. They separated before Harris was born, and she was raised by her mother in a council flat in Finsbury Park. Her mother later married her now stepfather, and Harris has two younger half-siblings.

Harris attended St Marylebone School in London. During childhood she studied acting at the Anna Scher Theatre before attending Woodhouse College as a sixth-form student. She graduated from Pembroke College, Cambridge, in 1998 with a degree in social and political sciences. Harris trained at the Bristol Old Vic Theatre School.

== Career ==
Harris has appeared in television and film since she was nine, including a starring role in the remake of the science fiction series The Tomorrow People. In 2000, she played Susan in The Witch of Edmonton at the Southwark Playhouse. She was in the cast of She Stoops to Conquer (Radio 3), Studio 3, Pebble Mill, May 2000. In November 2002, she starred in Danny Boyle's postapocalyptic film 28 Days Later. In the same year, she starred in the television adaptation of Zadie Smith's White Teeth. Harris has appeared in Pirates of the Caribbean: Dead Man's Chest, Pirates of the Caribbean: At World's End, and Michael Mann's Miami Vice. She did a comic turn in Michael Winterbottom's indie ensemble piece, A Cock and Bull Story (2005). She starred in Channel 4's adaptation of the 2006 novel Poppy Shakespeare, which was first shown on 31 March 2008. She also appeared in BBC's historical drama Small Island in December 2009.

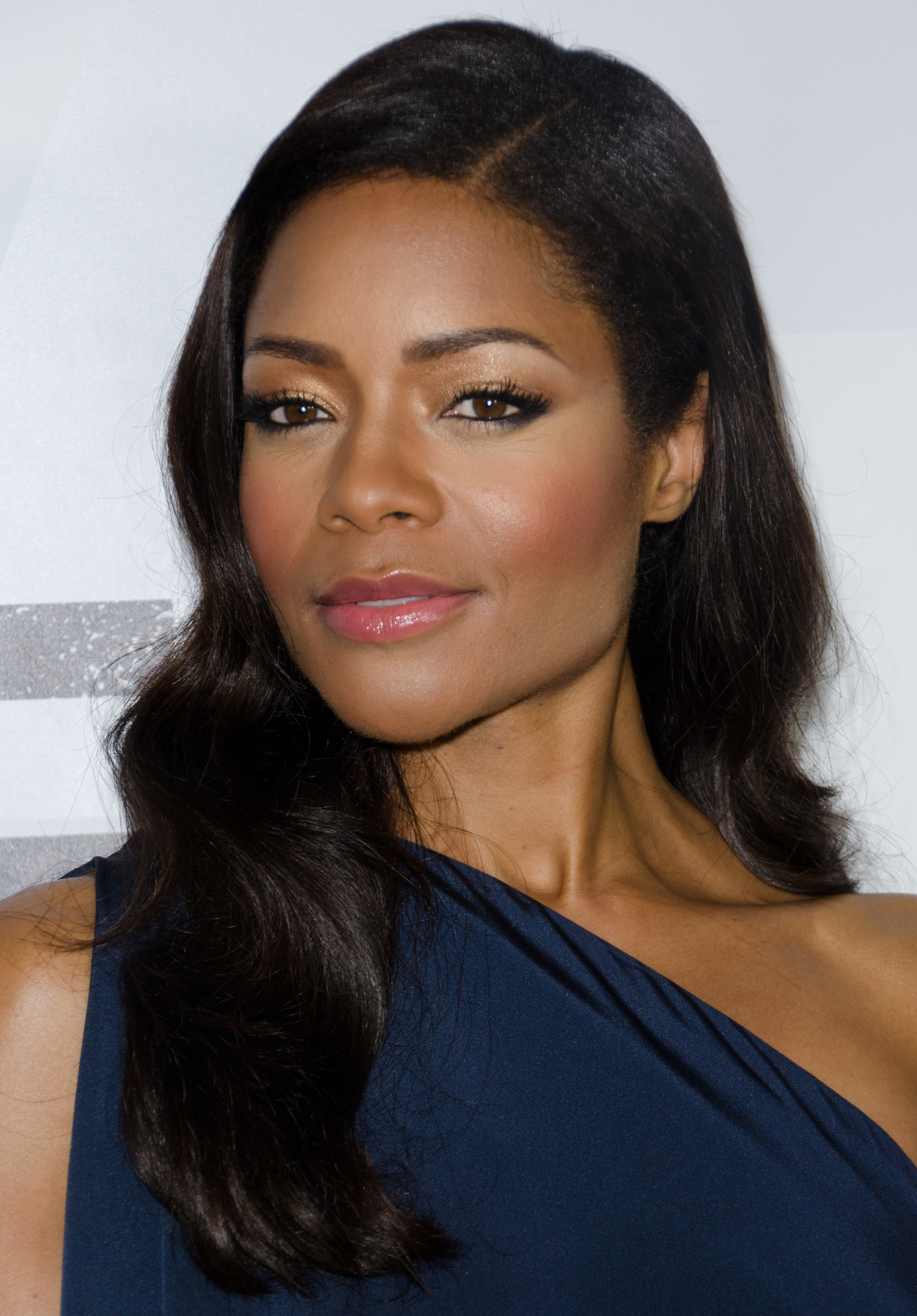
Harris at the Australian premiere of Skyfall at the State Theatre in 2012

She played Elizabeth Lavenza in Danny Boyle's stage production of Mary Shelley's Frankenstein for the National Theatre from 22 February to 2 May 2011. She played the lead role in The First Grader, directed by Justin Chadwick, which was premiered on 18 May 2011 in the Seattle International Film Festival.

Harris co-starred in the 23rd James Bond film, Skyfall (2012), playing Miss Moneypenny. She is the first black actress to play Moneypenny, and is the first Moneypenny to be given a first name. Harris reprised her role as Moneypenny in the 24th Bond film, Spectre, which was released on 26 October 2015.

Harris portrayed Winnie Mandela in the biopic Mandela: Long Walk to Freedom, based on the book of the same name, opposite the actor Idris Elba. The film was released on 29 November 2013. On viewing the film, Winnie Madikizela-Mandela told Harris that it seemed as if she were not acting, but channeling her, and that it was "the first time she felt truly captured on film".

In 2016, Harris starred as Paula in the critically acclaimed film Moonlight. She played the abusive, drug-addicted mother of the film's main character, Chiron. The film follows her son and her through a 20-year period. Moonlight won the Academy Award for Best Picture and Harris was nominated for an Academy Award for Best Supporting Actress, Screen Actors Guild Award for Outstanding Performance by a Female Actor in a Supporting Role, and Golden Globe Award for Best Supporting Actress – Motion Picture, among other awards.

In 2021, Harris reprised her role as Eve Moneypenny in the James Bond film No Time to Die and starred as Frances Barrison / Shriek in Venom: Let There Be Carnage. In July 2023, Harris narrated 'That girl is going to get herself killed' on Curio, an audio platform, that closed in 2024.

== Personal life ==
At about 11, Harris was diagnosed with scoliosis. The condition progressed severely into her teenage years which necessitated a spinal fusion; it took her a month to recover fully and she had to learn how to walk again. As a teenager, Harris also suffered from adenomyosis.

In 2012, Harris began a relationship with Peter Legler. On the topic of having children, Harris stated in a 2017 interview with Woman magazine:

People ask, 'So when are you going to have children?' I think it's a really odd thing because it's such a personal decision. And also, you don't know what is happening in someone's life. I find it bizarre, even with my friends, when they want me to have children. Why would you encourage anybody to have children unless it was their burning desire? You need to be fully committed to it ... Have children when you're ready, if you're ready, but only then. I'd never had any pressure.

== Filmography ==
Key
†	Denotes work that has not yet been released.

=== Film ===
Year	Title	Role	Notes	Ref.
2001	Crust	The Receptionist		
2002	Living In Hope	Ginny		
2002	Anansi	Carl		
2002	28 Days Later	Selena	Won — Black Reel Award for Outstanding Breakthrough Performance	
2004	Trauma	Elisa		
2004	After the Sunset	Sophie		
2006	Pirates of the Caribbean: Dead Man's Chest	Tia Dalma		
2006	Miami Vice	Trudy Joplin		
2006	A Cock and Bull Story	Jennie		
2007	Pirates of the Caribbean: At World's End	Tia Dalma / Calypso		
2008	Street Kings	Linda Washington		
2008	Explicit Ills	Jill		
2008	August	Sarah		
2009	Morris: A Life with Bells On	Sonja		
2009	Ninja Assassin	Europol Agent Mika Coretti		
2009	Sex & Drugs & Rock & Roll	Denise		
2009	My Last Five Girlfriends	Gemma		
2010	The First Grader	Jane Obinchu		
2012	Skyfall	Eve Moneypenny		
2013	Mandela: Long Walk to Freedom	Winnie Mandela		
2015	Southpaw	Angela Rivera		
2015	Spectre	Eve Moneypenny		
2016	Our Kind of Traitor	Gail Perkins		
2016	Moonlight	Paula	Nominated: Academy Award for Best Supporting Actress; BAFTA Award for Best Actress in a Supporting Role; Golden Globe Award for Best Supporting Film Actress; Screen Actors Guild Award for Outstanding Supporting Actress	
2016	Collateral Beauty	Madeleine		
2018	Rampage	Dr. Kate Caldwell		
2018	Mowgli: Legend of the Jungle	Nisha	Voice and motion capture	
2019	Black and Blue	Alicia West		
2021	Venom: Let There Be Carnage	Frances Barrison / Shriek		
2021	No Time to Die	Eve Moneypenny		
2021	Swan Song	Poppy Turner		
2024	The Wasp	Heather		
2024	Robin and the Hoods	Clipboard		
2025	Black Bag	Dr. Zoe Vaughan		

=== Television ===
Year	Title	Role	Notes	Ref.
1987–1988	Simon and the Witch	Joyce	12 episodes	
1989	Erasmus Microman	Millie	1 episode	
1992–1993	Runaway Bay	Shuku	17 episodes	
1992–1995	The Tomorrow People	Ami Jackson	16 episodes	
2000	Dream Team	Lola Olokwe	1 episode	
2002	Trial & Retribution V	Tara Gray	1 episode	
2002	White Teeth	Clara	4 episodes	
2002	The Project	Maggie Dunn	Television film	
2002–2003	Dinotopia	Romana	2 episodes	
2008	Poppy Shakespeare	Poppy Shakespeare	Television film	
2009	Small Island	Hortense Roberts	Television film	
2009	Blood and Oil	Alice Omuka	Television film	
2010	Accused	Alison Wade	1 episode	
2020	The Third Day	Helen	Main role	
2022	The Man Who Fell to Earth	Justin Falls	Main role, series	
TBA	Reputation	Lena	Main role	

=== Video games ===
Year	Title	Role	Notes	Ref.
2010	Fable III	Page	Voice	
2012	007 Legends	Eve Moneypenny	Voice	
2021	Sea of Thieves	Tia Dalma	Voice	

== Theatre ==
Year	Title	Role	Ref.
2000	The Witch of Edmonton	Susan Carter	
2011	Frankenstein	Elizabeth Lavenza	

== Awards and nominations ==
In addition to numerous acting awards, Harris was appointed an Officer of the Order of the British Empire (OBE) in the 2017 New Year Honours, for services to drama. She received the honour from Queen Elizabeth II at Buckingham Palace on 23 February 2017. She has also been recognised for her influence with her addition in the 2019 edition of the Powerlist, ranking the 100 most influential Black Britons.

Acting roles
Preceded by Samantha Bond	Miss Moneypenny actress 2012 – present	Incumbent
