= Alex Heffes =

British composer (born 1971)

Alex Heffes (/ˈhɛfəs/; born 2 September 1971) is a British film composer. His film scores include those for the BAFTA-winning Touching the Void, and Oscar-winning movies One Day in September, The Last King of Scotland, and Inside Job. Heffes was nominated for the Golden Globe Award for Best Original Score for his work on Mandela: Long Walk to Freedom.

== Early life and career ==
Heffes was born in Beaconsfield, Buckinghamshire, and learned the piano from an early age. He graduated from Oxford University with first class honours and started his professional life playing keyboards and writing and arranging for commercials and TV (his band is featured playing in jazz club scenes in the film Circus). This led to him becoming assistant to composer Simon Boswell with whom he scored over 20 movies including A Midsummer Night's Dream and Cousin Bette. He also collaborated on Elton John's score to Women Talking Dirty and worked with members of Blur.

== Film scoring ==
In 1999, after a chance meeting with Kevin Macdonald he wrote the score to the Oscar winning documentary One Day in September. This led to a long collaboration with Macdonald, on films such as Touching the Void, State of Play and The Last King of Scotland. During the production of Last King of Scotland he travelled to Uganda to produce the songs and score in the movie. He has worked with many notable directors including Stephen Frears (The Program), Mira Nair (Queen of Katwe), Justin Chadwick (The First Grader, Mandela: Long Walk to Freedom), Peter Webber (Emperor) and Catherine Hardwick (Red Riding Hood). He contributed additional arrangements to Tim Burton's Sweeney Todd.

In 2011 he released his first solo album, Face to Face. The album was created by improvising on location in a series of one on one collaborations with artists such as Regina Spektor, Ryuichi Sakamoto and Tunde Jegede. The tracks with Matthew Barley were recorded in the Turbine Hall of the Tate Modern in London.

He has been nominated for a Golden Globe, a BAFTA and won an Ivor Novello Award in 2012 for The First Grader. He composed the score for the TV series 11.22.63, which he later performed in-person for the 2017 ASCAP Screen Music Awards.

He always conducts his own orchestral scores and frequently plays piano on his scores.

== Works ==
=== Film score ===
Year	Film	Director(s)	Studio(s)	Notes
1999	One Day in September	Kevin Macdonald	Passion Pictures	—N/a
2000	Circus	Rob Walker	Circus Pictures; Film Development Corporation	with Simon Boswell
2000	Humphrey Jennings: The Man Who Listened to Britain	Kevin Macdonald	Figment TV Productions	—N/a
2000	A Brief History of Errol Morris	Kevin Macdonald	Independent Film Channel	—N/a
2001	Mind Games	Richard Standeven	La Plante Productions	with Simon Boswell
2001	Late Night Shopping	Saul Metzstein	FilmFour; Glasgow Film Office	—N/a
2001	The Parole Officer	John Duigan	DNA Films	—N/a
2002	Offside	Rachel Tillotson	BBC	Short
2003	Touching the Void	Kevin Macdonald	FilmFour	—N/a
2004	Trauma	Marc Evans	Warner Bros.	—N/a
2004	Dear Frankie	Shona Auerbach	Pathé Pictures	—N/a
2004	Out of Reach	Po-Chih Leong	Franchise Pictures	—N/a
2005	Too Fat Too Furious	Tim Oliehoek	Fu Works	—N/a
2005	Imagine Me & You	Ol Parker	BBC Films	—N/a
2006	The Bridge	Eric Steel	IFC Films	—N/a
2006	Shiny Shiny Bright New Hole in My Heart	Marc Munden	BBC Films	—N/a
2006	The Last King of Scotland	Kevin Macdonald	Fox Searchlight Pictures; DNA Films; FilmFour	-
2007	My Enemy's Enemy	Kevin Macdonald	Wild Bunch	—N/a
2009	State of Play	Kevin Macdonald	Universal Pictures; Working Title Films	—N/a
2009	Jasim	Peter Webber	SNDCOC	Short
2010	Inside Job	Charles Ferguson	Sony Pictures Classics	—N/a
2010	The First Grader	Justin Chadwick	BBC Films; UK Film Council	—N/a
2011	The Rite	Mikael Håfström	New Line Cinema; TriBeCa Productions; Warner Bros. Pictures	—N/a
2011	Red Riding Hood	Catherine Hardwicke	Warner Bros. Appian Way	with Brian Reitzell
2011	Stolen	Justin Chadwick	BBC	—N/a
2011	The Engagement	John Duigan	First Foot Films	—N/a
2012	Emperor	Peter Webber	Krasnoff Foster Productions; United Performers' Studio	—N/a
2013	Love and Honor	Danny Mooney	IFC Films	—N/a
2013	Escape Plan	Mikael Håfström	Emmett/Furla Films; Summit Entertainment	—N/a
2013	Mandela: Long Walk to Freedom	Justin Chadwick	Pathé	—N/a
2014	What We Did on Our Holiday	Andy Hamilton; Guy Jenkin	BBC Films	—N/a
2015	Palio	Cosima Spender	Palio Pictures	—N/a
2015	Ten Billion	Peter Webber	Oxford Film & Television	—N/a
2015	The Program	Stephen Frears	StudioCanal; Working Title Films	—N/a
2016	Sky Ladder: The Art of Cai Guo-Qiang	Kevin Macdonald	Netflix	—N/a
2016	The Take (Bastille Day)	James Watkins	StudioCanal; Anonymous Content	—N/a
2016	Queen of Katwe	Mira Nair	Walt Disney Pictures; ESPN Films	—N/a
2017	Earth: One Amazing Day	Richard Dale, Lixin Fan, Peter Webber	BBC Earth Films	Score nominated for an IFMCA Award
2018	Pickpockets	Peter Webber	Netflix	—N/a
2019	Miss Bala	Catherine Hardwicke	Columbia Pictures	—N/a
2019	The Elephant Queen	Victoria Stone & Mark Deeble	Apple TV+	—N/a
2019	Hope Gap	William Nicholson	Curzon Artificial Eye	—N/a
2020	The Big Ugly	Scott Wiper	Vertical Entertainment	—N/a
2020	The 24th	Kevin Willmott	Vertical Entertainment	—N/a
2020	Ronnie's	Oliver Murray	Greenwich Entertainment	—N/a
2021	The Arctic: Our Last Great Wilderness	Myles Connolly and Florian Schulz	Cosmic Picture Distribution	—N/a
2021	Intrusion	Adam Salky	Netflix	—N/a
2023	Mafia Mamma	Catherine Hardwicke	Bleecker Street	—N/a
2026	Brothers Under Fire	Justin Chadwick	Vertical	—N/a

=== Television ===
Year	Title	Studio/Channel	Notes
1997	Killer Net	Channel 4 Television Corporation	with Simon Boswell miniseries
2002	Stan the Man	ITV	6 episode miniseries
2006	Tsunami: The Aftermath	BBC; HBO Films	2 part miniseries
2012	Secret State	Company Pictures; Channel 4	4 episode miniseries
2016	11.22.63	Bad Robot; Warner Bros. Television	Hulu limited series 8 episodes
2016	Roots	History Channel	4 part miniseries
2016	Black Mirror Series 3 Episode 3: Shut Up and Dance	Netflix	-
2018	Next of Kin episodes 1-3	Mammoth Screen; ITV	6 part miniseries, music for episodes 4-6 composed by Peter Bateman
2020	A Suitable Boy	BBC One	6 episode miniseries

== Awards and nominations ==
- Nominated: 2007 BAFTA TV Awards Best Original Television Music - Tsunami: The Aftermath
- Nominated: 2007 European Film Award, European Composer - The Last King of Scotland
- Won: 2009 ASCAP Award for Top Box Office Films - State of Play
- Won: 2011 World Soundtrack Awards, Discovery of the Year - The First Grader, The Rite
- Nominated: 2012 Black Reel Awards, Best Original Score - The First Grader
- Nominated: 2012 Image Awards, Outstanding Soundtrack Album - The First Grader
- Won: 2012 Ivor Novello Awards, Best Original Film Score - The First Grader
- Nominated: 2013 Golden Globe Awards Best Original Score for a Motion Picture - Mandela: Long Walk to Freedom
- Nominated: 2016 Online Film & Television Association Awards, Best Music in a Non-Series - Roots (2016)
- Won: 2016 Hollywood Music In Media Awards, Original Score for a TV Show/Mini Series - Roots (2016)
- Nominated: 2021 Ivor Novello Awards, Best Original Film Score - A Suitable Boy
