= Peter Webber =

British director

- Born: 1960 (age 65–66); United Kingdom
- Education: University of Bristol
- Occupations: Film and television director and producer
- Years active: 1992–present

Peter Webber (born May 1960) is a British film and television director and producer.

== Early life ==
Webber took a one-year Postgraduate Film and TV course at the University of Bristol.

== Career ==
=== Films ===
Webber made his first short film, The Zebra Man (1992), about sideshow performer Horace Ridler starring Minnie Driver.

The 2003 film Girl with a Pearl Earring, starring Scarlett Johansson and Colin Firth, marked Webber's feature film debut. The film has received numerous accolades, including three Academy Award nominations, two Golden Globe nominations, and 10 BAFTA Award nominations.

Dino De Laurentiis tapped Webber to direct the 2007 film Hannibal Rising. Based on Thomas Harris' book of the same name, and starring Gaspard Ulliel, Gong Li and Rhys Ifans, this prequel depicts a young Hannibal Lecter as he gradually becomes a serial killer.

Webber directed the short film Jasim (2009).

Webber directed the 2012 World War II drama Emperor, starring Tommy Lee Jones.

Webber directed the 2018 film Pickpockets.

Webber directed the 2025 science fiction horror film DRAGN.

=== Television ===
He directed Simon Russell Beale as Franz Schubert in The Temptation of Franz Schubert and explored the counter-culture of tunnel-dwelling road protesters in Underground. His 2001 Channel 4 miniseries Men Only stirred controversy for its frank and shocking portrayal of the dark side of male sexuality. It is notable for giving early leads to Stephen Moyer of True Blood and Martin Freeman of The Hobbit.

Webber directed the 2016 ITV miniseries Tutankhamun, starring Sam Neill.

Webber directed the 2019 14-episode series Kingdoms of Fire.

=== Documentary ===
An award-winning documentary director, Webber directed several programmes for Channel 4 about classical music including child prodigies, maestros and composers such as Richard Wagner. He also directed several popular science documentaries about a range of subjects including crash test dummies, deep sea life and phantom limbs.

In 2009, he travelled into the remote Colombian Amazon to film with the Macuna Tribe for a documentary titled The Sand and the Rain.

Webber directed the 2019 documentary Inna de Yard: The Soul of Jamaica.

=== Producer ===
Webber moved to Qatar in 2008 where he took up the post of Creative Director at Qatar National Day for two years. During this time he developed their film programme. While in Qatar he also executive produced several documentary films including Sarajevo Film Festival winner For the Love of Books, which was also the recipient of a Grierson Award in 2012 for Best Historical Documentary.

== Filmography ==
=== Films ===
- The Stretford Wives (2001)
- Girl with a Pearl Earring (2003)
- Hannibal Rising (2007)
- Emperor (2012)
- Earth: One Amazing Day (2017)
- Pickpockets: maestros del robo (2018)
- Inna de Yard: The Soul of Jamaica (2019)
- DRAGN (2025)

=== Television ===
- The Temptation of Franz Schubert (1997)
- Underground (1999)
- Men Only (2001)
- Six Feet Under (2004, TV episode "The Dare")
- Tutankhamun (2016)
- Kingdoms of Fire (2019)
