= Red Riding Hood (2011 film) =

2011 film by Catherine Hardwicke

- Theatrical release poster
- Directed by: Catherine Hardwicke
- Written by: David Leslie Johnson
- Based on: "Little Red Riding Hood" by Charles Perrault and by Brothers Grimm
- Produced by: Leonardo DiCaprio; Jennifer Davisson Killoran; Julie Yorn
- Starring: Amanda Seyfried; Gary Oldman; Billy Burke; Shiloh Fernandez; Max Irons; Julie Christie
- Cinematography: Mandy Walker
- Edited by: Julia Wong; Nancy Richardson
- Music by: Alex Heffes; Brian Reitzell
- Production company: Appian Way Productions
- Distributed by: Warner Bros. Pictures
- Release dates: March 7, 2011 (Hollywood premiere); March 11, 2011 (United States)
- Running time: 100 minutes
- Country: United States
- Language: English
- Budget: $42 million
- Box office: $97.8 million

Red Riding Hood is a 2011 American romantic fantasy horror film directed by Catherine Hardwicke, and produced by Leonardo DiCaprio, from a screenplay by David Leslie Johnson. The film is very loosely based on the folk tale "Little Red Riding Hood" collected by both Charles Perrault under the name Le Petit Chaperon Rouge (Little Red Riding Hood) and several decades later by the Brothers Grimm as Rotkäppchen (Little Red Cap). It stars Amanda Seyfried as the title role, with Gary Oldman, Billy Burke, Shiloh Fernandez, Max Irons, Virginia Madsen, Lukas Haas and Julie Christie in supporting roles.

Red Riding Hood had its world premiere at Hollywood on March 7, 2011, and was theatrically released on March 11, 2011, by Warner Bros. Pictures. The film received negative reviews, and was a box-office success, grossing $98 million worldwide against its $42 million budget.

== Plot ==
Valerie lives with her parents, Cesaire and Suzette, and older sister Lucie in Daggerhorn, a village on the edge of a forest plagued by a Wolf that is also a werewolf. She is in love with her childhood friend Peter, a local woodcutter, but her parents arrange for her to marry Henry, son of the wealthy blacksmith Adrien Lazar. Valerie and Peter plan to elope, only to learn the Wolf has broken its truce not to prey on the townspeople and murdered Lucie.

The preacher Father Auguste calls upon the famous witch hunter Father Solomon for help, but the townspeople decide to venture into the Wolf's lair to kill it. As the village celebrates, Father Solomon declares that the slain animal is a common grey wolf, as the true werewolf would have reverted to human form.

Father Solomon's men isolate Daggerhorn and investigate the villagers to uncover the Wolf's identity. That night, the Wolf attacks, and the townspeople shelter in the church while Valerie and her friend Roxanne search for Roxanne's developmentally disabled brother, Claude. When the two become cornered by the Wolf, Valerie discovers she can understand him, who threatens to kill Roxanne and destroy the village if Valerie does not leave with him. It escapes, vowing to return for her decision.

The next day, Claude is captured and killed by Father Solomon's men, who confuse his agitated state for supposedly practicing black magic. Roxanne reveals that Valerie is able to communicate with the Wolf. Believing Valerie is also a witch, Father Solomon displays her in the town square to lure out the Wolf.

Henry and Peter help Valerie escape. Henry brings her to the church, where the Wolf bites off Father Solomon's hand with silver-coated fingernails. The villagers shield Valerie from the Wolf, who is again forced to flee after burning his right paw on the church's holy ground. Since Father Solomon has been bitten by the Wolf, the Captain promptly kills him.

Valerie dreams that the Wolf is her grandmother, so rushes to her nearby cabin. There she finds her dead and discovers that her father Cesaire is actually the Wolf. He reveals the curse was passed to him by his own father and he intended to leave the village with his children. Cesaire killed Lucie upon finding she could not understand him in wolf form and realizing Suzette had conceived her through an affair with Adrien. He asks Valerie to accept the curse, but she refuses.

Peter arrives and Cesaire bites him and throws him aside, but Peter throws an axe into Cesaire's back, allowing Valerie to kill him. They fill Cesaire's body with rocks and dump him in the lake in order to protect the secret from the villagers. Peter departs, vowing to return when he has learned to control the curse, and Valerie vows to wait for him.

In the next few years, Daggerhorn returns to normal, despite Cesaire's death. The people continue to sacrifice livestock to the werewolf, fearful of its return and not knowing it has been killed. Suzette accepts Cesaire is never coming back, though she remains unaware that Valerie killed him. Henry becomes the next witch hunter, succeeding Father Solomon and becoming a highly honorable man.

Valerie chooses to live in her grandmother's home in the forest on her own, having become disillusioned with living in Daggerhorn. Finally, one night, she hears something in the woods outside her house. She is then greeted by Peter, transformed into a werewolf and in full control of his abilities, when he returns to be with her. In the ending of the alternate cut, when Valerie sees Peter upon his return, she is holding their baby.

== Cast ==
- Amanda Seyfried as Valerie
  - Megan Charpentier as young Valerie
- Virginia Madsen as Suzette, Valerie's mother.
- Billy Burke as Cesaire, Valerie's father.
- Julie Christie as Grandmother.
- Shiloh Fernandez as Peter, childhood friend and love interest of Valerie.
  - DJ Greenburg as young Peter
- Max Irons as Henry Lazar, Valerie's suitor.
- Gary Oldman as Father Solomon, leader of the witch hunters.
- Michael Shanks as Adrien Lazar, Henry's father and former lover of Suzette.
- Christine Willes as Madame Lazar
- Adrian Holmes as Captain
- Michael Hogan as The Reeve
- Lukas Haas as Father Auguste
- Alexandria Maillot as Lucie, Valerie's sister and Suzette's daughter by Adrien.
- Shauna Kain as Roxanne
- Kacey Rohl as Prudence
- Carmen Lavigne as Rose
- Jennifer Halley as Marguerite
- Archie Rice as the voice of The Wolf

== Production ==
Under Appian Way Productions, Leonardo DiCaprio, Michael Ireland, Jennifer Davisson Killoran, Alex Mace, and Julie Yorn produced the film. Early into production, the film was originally titled The Girl with the Red Riding Hood. Due to the fact that Seyfried did not like Fernandez based on a previous encounter at a dinner party, director Catherine Hardwicke had to persuade the actress to give the actor a chance. Principal photography took place in Vancouver from July 21 to September 16, 2010.

== Release ==
The original release date, set for April 22, 2011, was moved to March 11, 2011. Red Riding Hood grossed $14,005,335 in ticket sales over the opening weekend, placing at number #3, behind Battle: Los Angeles and Rango. At the end of its run in 2011, the film grossed $37,662,162 in the United States and Canada, and grossed $51,500,000 internationally for a worldwide total of $89,162,162.

== Reception ==
Red Riding Hood has a 10% approval rating at review aggregator Rotten Tomatoes based on 208 reviews, with an average score of 3.75/10. The site's critical consensus reads, "Amanda Seyfried is magnetic in Red Riding Hood's starring role, but she's let down by her uninspired leading men and a painfully clichéd script." Metacritic calculated a score of 29 out of 100 based on the opinions of 36 critics, indicating "generally unfavorable reviews". Audiences polled by CinemaScore gave the film an average grade of "B−" on an A+ to F scale.

USA Today complimented the production design, but wrote that, "it's a foolish story, marred by a strange blend of overacting and bland, offhand performances." Roger Ebert gave the film one star out of four, stating it is "a movie that cross-pollinates the Twilight formula with a werewolf and a girl who always wears a red-hooded cape, although I don't recall her doing any riding... it has the added inconvenience of being serious about a plot so preposterous, it demands to be filmed by Monty Python."

Mary Pols of Time magazine named it one of the 10 worst films of 2011.

== Marketing ==
The teaser trailer and the poster were released in November 2010, featuring "The Wolf", a new song written exclusively for the film by Swedish act Fever Ray.

The second trailer was released in January 2011, featuring "The Hand That Feeds" by Nine Inch Nails.

The novelization by Sarah Blakley-Cartwright received criticism for not including the story's final, concluding chapter, which instead was only made available for download online following the release of the film.

== Soundtrack ==
1. "Towers of the Void" – Brian Reitzell
2. "Kids" – Brian Reitzell and Alex Heffes
3. "Dead Sister" – Brian Reitzell and Alex Heffes
4. "The Wolf" – Fever Ray
5. "Mt. Grimoor" – Brian Reitzell and Alex Heffes
6. "Tavern Stalker" – Brian Reitzell and Alex Heffes
7. "Grandma’s House" – Brian Reitzell and Alex Heffes
8. "Keep the Streets Empty for Me" – Fever Ray
9. "Wolf Attack" – Brian Reitzell and Alex Heffes
10. "Just a Fragment of You" – Anthony Gonzalez from M83 and Brian Reitzell
11. "The Reveal" – Brian Reitzell and Alex Heffes
12. "Finale" – Brian Reitzell and Alex Heffes
13. "Crystal Visions" – The Big Pink

Some additional songs from the film are not featured on the official soundtrack:

- "Fire Walking" – Anthony Gonzalez and Brian Reitzell
- "Let’s Start an Orchestra" – Ken Andrews and Brian Reitzell
- "Ozu Choral" – Brian Reitzell
- "Piano Study No. 1 (Symphonic)" – Brian Reitzell
