= The First Grader =

2010 film by Justin Chadwick

- Theatrical release poster
- Directed by: Justin Chadwick
- Written by: Ann Peacock
- Produced by: Sam Feuer; Richard Harding; David M. Thompson; Mario Zvan
- Starring: Oliver Litondo; Naomie Harris; Tony Kgoroge
- Cinematography: Rob Hardy
- Edited by: Paul Knight
- Music by: Alex Heffes
- Production companies: Distant Horizon; National Geographic Entertainment; Videovision Entertainment; BBC Films; UK Film Council; Sixth Sense Productions; Origin Pictures; Big Boy Films; Lipsync Productions; Arte France
- Distributed by: Goldcrest Films International; Distant Horizon (United States); National Geographic Entertainment (International)
- Release dates: 4 September 2010 (Telluride); 13 May 2011 (United States); 24 June 2011 (United Kingdom)
- Running time: 103 minutes
- Countries: United Kingdom; United States; Kenya
- Languages: English; Swahili
- Box office: $1.2 million

The First Grader is a 2011 biographical drama film directed by Justin Chadwick. It stars Naomie Harris, Oliver Litondo, and Tony Kgoroge. The film is inspired by the true story of Kimani Maruge, a Kenyan farmer who enrolled in elementary school at the age of 84 following the Kenyan government's announcement of free universal primary education in 2003 by the late Emilio Mwai Kibaki, the third president of the Republic of Kenya.

== Plot ==
In 2003, a disc jockey announces over a Kenyan radio station that the government is offering free primary school education to all natives who can prove citizenship with a birth certificate. Kimani Maruge (Litondo), an 84-year-old villager, hears this and decides to take it upon himself to seek an education. Arriving at his local school, he meets Jane Obinchu (Harris), the principal and teacher. He expresses his desire to learn how to read. Her teaching colleague Alfred (Munyua), ridicules him and demands he leave. Later, Jane informs her husband Charles (Kgoroge) about Maruge. He discourages her in supporting his educational endeavor.

After beginning his initial classes, Maruge is plagued by memories of his service during the Mau Mau Uprising against the British in the 1950s. He begins to hallucinate and becomes confrontational with the students, struggling to continue his academics. Controversy begins to stir over Maruge's education. Soon enough, the story that an elderly man going to school becomes national headlines. Mr. Kipruto (Kunene), a superintendent of the school district, is alerted to the situation and strongly disapproves of Maruge's predicament and suggests that he go to an adult educational facility.

Meeting with the head of the education board to plead Maruge's case, Jane is overruled. It is explained to her that if an exception is made to keep Maruge in the school, others will follow, and many schools will eventually become filled with older people sitting aside children. Maruge is forced to attend an adult learning centre, where he soon finds himself surrounded by people with no motivation or ambition to study. Maruge vows to never go back to the adult institution. Jane later decides to offer him a reprieve, to work as her teaching assistant. As Maruge's story gains publicity and attention, the local press descend on the school, causing friction among the parents. The villagers believe Jane and Maruge are seeking fame and fortune at the expense of the children. Following negative feedback and random acts of violence against the school, Jane soon receives a letter that she is to be transferred to another educational institute a few hundred miles away.

Jane reveals to Maruge that she is relocating, and then commences an emotional goodbye with the children. Following protests and disobedience on part of the students towards their new teacher, Maruge is motivated to travel to Nairobi to appeal himself to the education board. Jane is reinstated at the school, where Maruge and the children are there to welcome her. The film's epilogue displays a series of graphics stating that at age 84, Maruge is the oldest person to start primary school according to the Guinness Book of World Records. Supplementally, he was invited to make a speech before international leaders at the UN in New York regarding the power of education. He inspired a whole new generation of people to go to school for the first time. Maruge later died in 2009.

== Cast ==
- Naomie Harris as Jane Obinchu
- Oliver Litondo as Kimani Maruge
- Alfred Munyua as Alfred
- Tony Kgoroge as Charles Obinchu
- Vusi Kunene as Mr. Kipruto
- Sam Feuer as American Journalist
- Shoki Mogkgapa as Elizabeth
- Agnes Simaloi as Agnes
- Kamau Mbaya as Kamau Chege
- Emily Njoki as Young Maruge's Wife
- Lwanda Jawar as Young Maruge
- Dan 'Churchill' Ndambuki as DJ Masha
- Hannah Wacera as Maruge's Daughter
- John Kimani as Maruge's Baby Son
- Macharia Kamau as DJ's PA
- Abubakar Mwenda as Boie
- Tom Gitau as Old Codger
- Watson Mbirua as Old Codger
- Shadrack Murimi Gachuhi as Old Codger
- Mwenga Matilika as Old Codger
- Kathyline Ndogori as Teacher Katherine
- Israel Matseke-Zulu as David Chege
- Shirleen Wangari as Mother Wanjiku
- Benta Ochieng as Mother Benta
- Peter Emera Pious as Jonas
- Joel Rempesa as Joel
- Peter Marias as Peter
- Eunice Tekero as Village Woman
- Jackie Musimbi as Village Girl
- Susan Sisian as Young Mother
- Kurenda Ole Kureya as Maasai Store Owner
- Nick Reding as Officer Johnson
- Nick Ndichu as Mau Mau Oath Giver
- Paul Mbogo as Mau Mau Leader
- Zingaro Percussions as Mau Mau Warriors
- Jeanette Elsworth as Plantation Owner's Wife
- Kamau Ndungu as John Gambe
- Mary Mbirua as Stall Owner
- Catherine Njiru as Stall Owner
- Mumbi Kaigwa as Education Secretary
- Charles Ouda as Adult School Teacher
- Rachel Jones as BBC Journalist
- Lydia Gitachu as CNN Journalist
- Gilbert K. Lukalia as Mr. Mutahi / Politician
- Melvin Alusa as Mr. Mutahi's Aide
- Irene Kariuki as Mrs. Muthumba
- Rosemary Nyambura as Jacquie (PA to the Chairman)
- Ainea Ojiambo as Education Official
- John Sibi-Okumu as Chairman of Education
- Michael Oyier as Newsreader

== Production ==
=== Filming ===
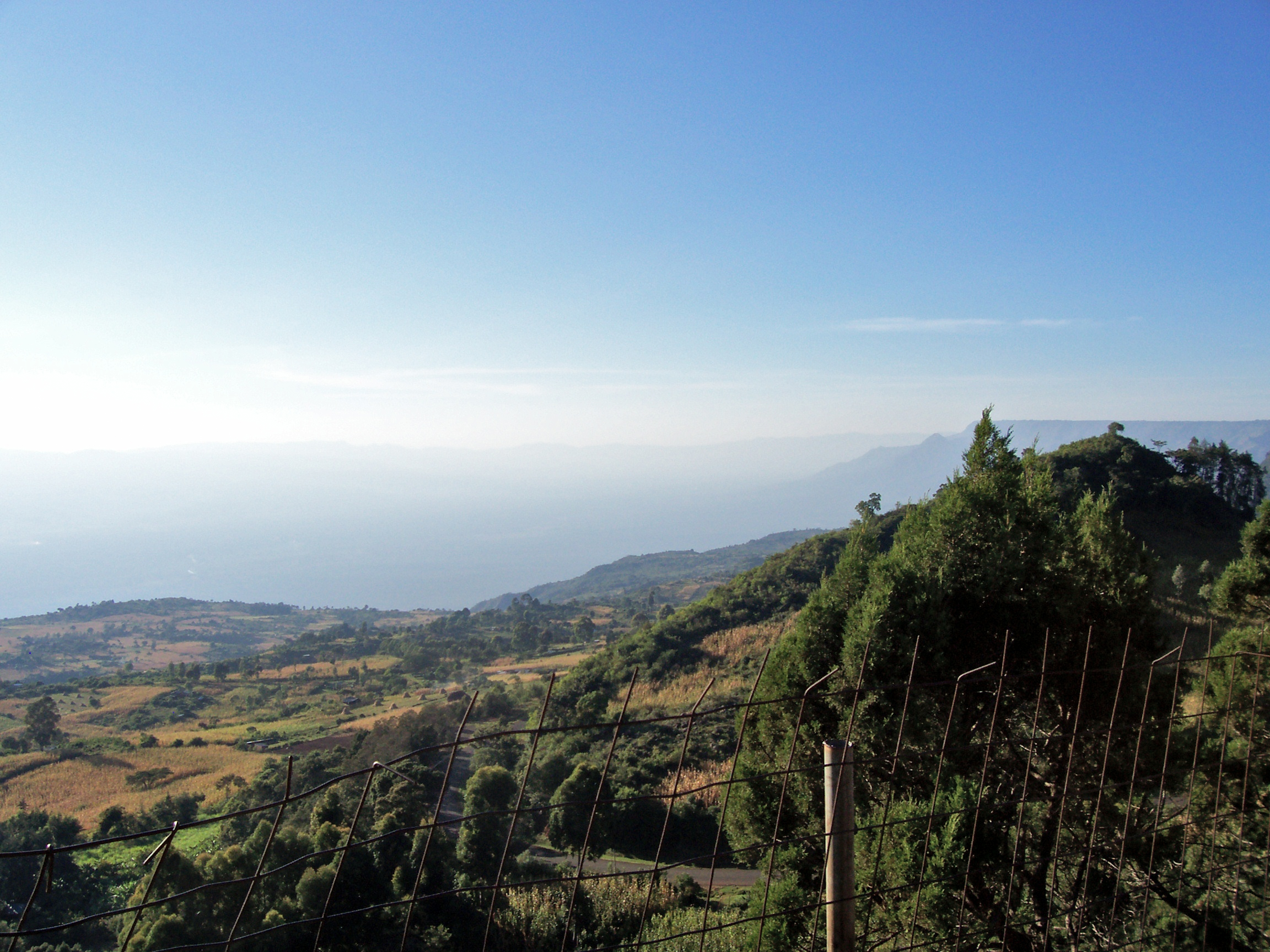
The Great Rift Valley in Kenya, where filming took place.

US based film producer Sam Feuer found the story on the front page of the LA Times and optioned the rights. He, and then, producing partner Richard Harding, partnered with BBC Films and hired Ann Peacock to write the screenplay. The British produced film was shot on location in the Rift Valley in Kenya, despite earlier reports that it would be filmed in South Africa. Director Chadwick conveyed, "We could have shot it in South Africa, but Kenya has this unbelievable, inexplicable energy inherent in the children, and the people we were making the film about".

== Reception ==
=== Critical response ===
Among mainstream critics the film received generally mixed reviews. Rotten Tomatoes gave the film a fresh score of 61% based on reviews from 71 critics, with an average score of 5.6 out of 10. At Metacritic, which assigns a weighted average out of 100 to critics' reviews, The First Grader was given a score of 56 based on 21 reviews.

== Awards and nominations ==
Year	Awarding Organisation	Category	Nominee	Result	Ref
2011	Emden International Film Festival	The Bernhard Wicki Award	The First Grader	Won	
2011	Emden International Film Festival	The DGB Trade Union Award (Audience Choice)	The First Grader	Won	
2011	Satellite Awards	Best Education Film	The first Grader	Won	
2011	Gotham Awards	Audience Award	The First Grader	Nominated	
2012	Image Awards (NAACP)	Outstanding Motion Picture	The First Grader	Nominated	
2012	Image Awards (NAACP)	Outstanding Actor in Motion Picture	Oliver Litondo	Nominated	
2012	Image Awards (NAACP)	Outstanding Independent Motion Picture	The First Grader	Nominated	
2012	Image Awards (NAACP)	Outstanding Writing in a Motion Picture	Ann Peacock	Won	
2012	Image Awards (NAACP)	Outstanding Soundtrack Album	Alex Hefes	Nominated	
2012	Image Awards (NAACP)	Outstanding Motion Picture	The First Grader	Nominated	
2012	Image Awards (NAACP)	Outstanding Independent Motion Picture	The First Grader	Nominated	
2011	Nashville Film Festival	Best Feature	The First Grader	Won	
2011	Palm Beach International Film Festival	Best Feature Film	The First Grader	Won	
2011	Rochester International Film Festival	Best narrative Film	The First Film	Won	
2011	Sedona International Film Festival	Best Feature Film- Director's Choice award	The First Grader	Won	
2011	Sedona International Film Festival	Best Feature Film - Audience Award	The First Grader	Won	
2010	Sedona International Film Festival	Best Feature Film - Audience Award	The First Grader	Won	
2010	Sedona International Film Festival	Best Feature Film- Director's Choice award	The First Grader	Won	
2010	Toronto International Film Festival	People's Choice Award	The First Grader	Nominated	
2011	World Soundtrack Awards	Discovery of The Year	Alex Heffes	Won	
2012	Zanzibar International Film Festival	Best Feature - Ingoma Trophy	The First Grader	Won	
2012	Black Reel Awards	Best Actor	Oliver Litondo	Nominated	
2012	Black Reel Awards	Best Actress	Naomie Harris	Nominated	
2012	Black Reel Awards	Best Original Score	Alex Heffes	Nominated	
2012	Black Reel Awards	Outstanding Foreign Film	The First Grader	Nominated	
2011	Durban International Film Festival	Best Film	The First Grader	Won	
2011	Pan African Film Festival	Narrative Feature Film - Audience Favorite Award	The First Grader	Won	
2011	Black Film Critics Circle Awards	Best Actor	Oliver Litondo	Won	
2012	Ivor Novello Awards	Best Original Film Score	Alex Heffes	Won	
2012	AARP Movies for Grownups Awards	Best Actor	Oliver Litondo	Won	
2011	360 365 Film Festival	Best Feature	The First Grader	Won	

== See also ==
- 2010 in film
- Mau Mau Uprising
