= The Rite (2011 film) =

- Theatrical release poster
- Directed by: Mikael Håfström
- Written by: Michael Petroni
- Based on: The Rite: The Making of a Modern Exorcist by Matt Baglio
- Produced by: Beau Flynn; Tripp Vinson
- Starring: Anthony Hopkins; Colin O'Donoghue; Alice Braga; Ciarán Hinds; Rutger Hauer
- Cinematography: Ben Davis
- Edited by: Peter Boyle
- Music by: Alex Heffes
- Production companies: New Line Cinema; Contrafilm
- Distributed by: Warner Bros. Pictures
- Release dates: January 26, 2011 (Hollywood); January 28, 2011 (United States)
- Running time: 114 minutes
- Countries: United States; Hungary; Italy; United Kingdom
- Languages: English; Italian; Latin
- Budget: $37 million
- Box office: $97.1 million

The Rite is a 2011 supernatural horror film directed by Mikael Håfström and written by Michael Petroni. It is loosely based on Matt Baglio's book The Rite: The Making of a Modern Exorcist, which itself is based on actual events as witnessed and recounted by American then-exorcist-in-training Father Gary Thomas and his experiences of being sent to Rome to be trained and work daily with veteran clergy of the practice.

The film stars Anthony Hopkins, Colin O'Donoghue, Alice Braga, Ciarán Hinds, and Rutger Hauer. Shot in Rome, Budapest, and Blue Island, it was released on January 28, 2011, received generally negative reviews from critics, and grossed $97.1 million worldwide.

== Plot ==
Michael Kovak is the son of a successful funeral home owner and businessman, Istvan. Disillusioned with his job as a mortician, Michael decides to enter a seminary and renounce his vows upon completion, thereby getting a free college degree. Four years later, Michael is being ordained to the rank of deacon at the seminary, after which he writes a letter of resignation to his superior, Father Matthew, citing a lack of faith. Father Matthew, apparently wanting to talk to Michael, attempts to catch up to him on the street. He trips over a curb, causing a cyclist, Sandra, to swerve into the path of an oncoming van, and get critically injured. Seeing Michael's clerical garb, she asks him for absolution before her last breath. The hesitant Michael is unable to refuse; he comforts her and performs a blessing ritual to absolve her of her sins. Seeing how calmly Michael handled the situation, Father Matthew tells Michael that he is called to be a priest despite his unwillingness. He also tells Michael that with the rise in demonic possessions every year, the Church needs more exorcists and says that he has the potential to become one. Father Matthew advises him to go to the Vatican in Rome to attend an exorcism course taught by his friend Father Xavier. Michael agrees after Father Matthew tells him that the Church might convert his scholarship into a student loan that would cost him $100,000 if his resignation is accepted before he takes his vows. If Michael attends the exorcism classes and still wants to leave, then it can be discussed (hinting that he may be free to leave).

In Italy, Michael meets Angelina, also taking the course. He soon learns that she is a reporter who has been asked to cover the course for a newspaper article in the Dominican. Father Xavier notes Michael's skepticism and very tentative faith and asks him to meet a renowned friend, a Welsh Jesuit exorcist named Father Lucas. Michael meets Father Lucas at his home, where he also meets one of the priest's patients: a pregnant sixteen-year-old girl named Rosaria, who is possessed and Lucas is trying to exorcise. It is later revealed that she had been raped and abandoned by her father, which led to her possession. However, Michael remains skeptical, even after witnessing several preternatural events, such as the girl coughing up three long nails and speaking English fluently. She even pointedly reminds Michael of the last patient he anointed and of his loathing for his own father. Angelina requests Michael to relay any information he gets from Father Lucas to her, as the latter has always refused to be interviewed by her, which Michael declines. Rosaria tries to drown herself and is hospitalized. In the hospital, Father Lucas performs another exorcism. Rosaria miscarries; the baby dies from cardiac arrest, and the mother from major hemorrhaging. Disheartened, Father Lucas feels he has failed her. After this Michael decides to confide with Angelina.

After Rosaria's death, Father Lucas begins behaving strangely. Michael and Angelina find him sitting outside his house in the rain. Father Lucas takes them into his house and, knowing himself to be possessed, requests that Michael bring Father Xavier to perform the exorcism. Angelina and Michael try desperately to contact and find Father Xavier, but the latter has gone to Civitavecchia for three days. Michael decides to perform the exorcism himself with Angelina. After constant rebuking by the demon and a long, drawn-out fight, Michael regains his lost faith and is able to force the demon to reveal its name, Baal. He completes the exorcism, saying that he believes the demon exists, and he believes in an all powerful God as well. The demon leaves Father Lucas. Michael bids goodbye to Father Lucas, returning to the United States.

Michael, having decided to become a priest after all, receives a letter that Angelina has published an article on the exorcism. Father Michael then enters a confessional to hear a girl's confession in his church.

== Cast ==
- Anthony Hopkins as Father Lucas Trevant
- Colin O'Donoghue as Michael Kovak
- Alice Braga as Angelina Vargas
- Ciarán Hinds as Father Xavier
- Toby Jones as Father Matthew
- Rutger Hauer as Istvan Kovak
- Marta Gastini as Rosaria
- Maria Grazia Cucinotta as Aunt Andria
- Arianna Veronesi as Francesca
- Andrea Calligari as Vincenzo
- Chris Marquette as Eddie
- Torrey DeVitto as Nina
- Ben Cheetham as Young Michael Kovak
- Marija Karan as Sandra
- Rosa Pianeta as Woman In Exorcism video
- Giampiero Ingrassia as Doctor
- Rosario Tedesco as Police Officer
- Cecilia Dazzi as Nurse
- Attila Bardóczy as Father Xavier's Secretary
- Nadia Kibout as Ethnic Nun
- Anita Pititto as Vatican Nun
- Sándor Baranyai as Concierge
- Fabiola Balestriere as Young Girl
- Anikó Vincze as Katalin Kovac
- Adriano Aragon as Italian Doctor (voice)
- Susan Silo as Lady (and additional voices)
- Peter Arpesella as Doctor (and additional voices)
- Jasper Jacob as Priest
- Nico Toffoli as the Demon (uncredited voice)
- Beatrice Zentai as Woman In Confessional

== Production ==
Mikael Håfström began working on the exorcism thriller in February 2010. Håfström began casting in March for the lead roles of Father Lucas and Michael Kovak, deciding on Anthony Hopkins and Colin O'Donoghue. The film was produced by Beau Flynn and Tripp Vinson (The Exorcism of Emily Rose) under their Contrafilm Studios company.

=== Background ===
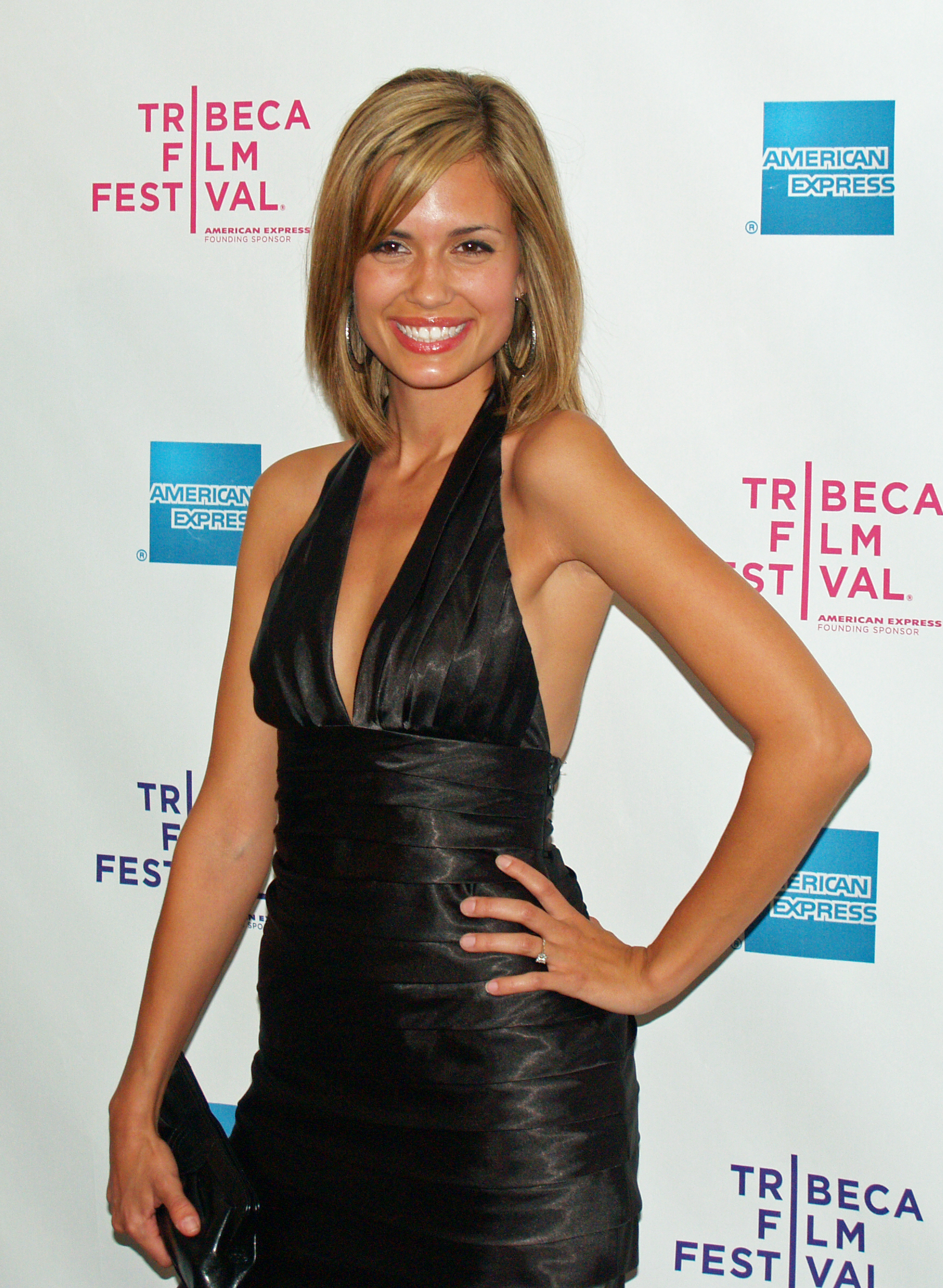
Actress Torrey DeVitto portrayed Nina in the film

The film is based on the book The Rite: The Making of a Modern Exorcist by then Rome-based American journalist Matt Baglio, which was published in 2009 and 2010. To research the book, Baglio participated in a seminar on exorcism by the Vatican-sponsored Pontifical Athenaeum Regina Apostolorum where he met Father Gary Thomas, a parish priest from Sacred Heart Church in Saratoga, California, who was tasked by the local bishop in San Jose, California to become an exorcist for the diocese. Initially skeptical and reluctant, Father Gary becomes an "apprentice" to a Rome-based exorcist and his skepticism is soon replaced by the cold reality of evil and the ways it sometimes takes the form of demonic possession. The book traces Father Gary's life prior to and subsequent to their acquaintance in 2005 which involved Baglio observing over twenty exorcisms performed by Father Gary. Baglio indicates that the experience in writing the book "was just a very spiritual process and in a lot of ways, it helped me reconnect to the Church and understand the value of faith. This isn't something that is silly and prayer, it's very important."

While Baglio was still researching his book, producers Tripp Vinson and Beau Flynn (who had already produced The Exorcism of Emily Rose) learned about Baglio's book proposal and decided to purchase the movie rights. The producers contacted Michael Petroni (who was one of the writers for The Chronicles of Narnia: The Voyage of the Dawn Treader) to write the screenplay. Petroni, a practicing Catholic, coordinated the development of his screenplay with Baglio, who was now writing the book at about the same time.

Håfström was invited to direct the film "intrigued by the fact that he would be working from facts, not just someone's imagination." While the film is focused on demonic possession and exorcism, Håfström also believes that "this story is about a young man finding himself and finding his way." In preparation for the film, Håfström attended some exorcisms in Rome although never being present in the actual room, he could hear what was taking place. Father Gary Thomas served as a consultant on the set of The Rite and indicated that the exorcisms in the film were "very accurate" with some "expected licenses" taken.

According to actor Franco Nero, he filmed a nine-minute monologue which was entirely cut from the final film.

== Release ==
Warner Bros. Pictures released the film on January 28, 2011.

== Reception ==
=== Box office ===
The Rite grossed $33 million in the United States and Canada, and $64.1 million in other territories, for a worldwide total of $97.1 million.

The film made $14.8 million from 2,985 theaters in its opening weekend, beating fellow newcomer The Mechanic and topping the box office. It fell 62% to $5.6 million in its second weekend, finishing sixth, and made $3.3 million in its third weekend, dropping to 11th.

=== Critical response ===
On the review aggregator website Rotten Tomatoes, 22% of 171 critics' reviews are positive, with an average rating of 4.3/10. The website's consensus reads: "Anthony Hopkins is as excellent as ever, but he's no match for The Rite's dawdling pace and lack of chills -- or Colin O'Donoghue's tentative performance in the leading role." Metacritic, which uses a weighted average, assigned the film a score of 33 out of 100, based on 38 critics, indicating "generally unfavorable" reviews. Audiences polled by CinemaScore gave the film an average grade of "B" on an A+ to F scale.

Roger Ebert of the Chicago Sun-Times gave the film three out of four stars and said, "I admire The Rite because while it delivers what I suppose should be called horror, it is atmospheric, its cinematography is eerie and evocative, and the actors enrich it."

=== Response from Catholic Church ===
The film was generally well-received within the Catholic community, although some questioned its classification as "horror". The United States Conference of Catholic Bishops noted: "Though shaky on a few details, director Mikael Håfström's conversion tale resoundingly affirms faith and the value of priestly ministry. Yet the effort to showcase the main character's spiritual journey as an old-fashioned chillfest weakens its ultimate impact."

== See also ==
- Exorcism in the Catholic Church
- The Exorcism of Emily Rose
- The Exorcist
- The Pope's Exorcist
