= Lee Jin-hee (actress) =

South Korean actress (born 1983)

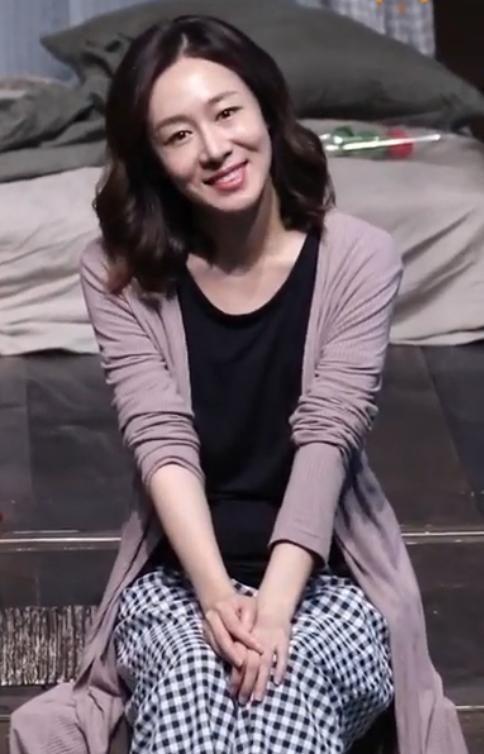
- Lee in 2018
- Born: February 15, 1983 (age 43); Seoul, South Korea
- Education: Department of Theater of Yongin University
- Occupation: Actress
- Years active: 2004–present
- Agent: Alien Company
- Spouse: Ahn Se-ho

Korean name
- Hangul: 이진희
- RR: I Jinhui
- MR: I Chinhŭi

Lee Jin-hee (Korean: 이진희; born February 15, 1983) is a South Korean actress. Debuting in the play Mother in 2004, Lee has worked in variety of acting mediums, such as plays, musicals, movies and television dramas. She is also an actress with good acting reputation in Daehangno.

== Early life ==
Lee Jin-hee was born on February 15, 1983. While growing up, she considered various career paths, including teaching or acting. An opportunity to pursue acting arose when Lee transferred from a humanities major in high school to a theater major at Gyewon Arts High School (계원예술고등학교) in Seongnam, Gyeonggi Province, due to her father's job transfer. After graduating from high school, Lee enrolled in the Department of Theater at Yong In University, located in Samgak-dong, Cheoin District, Yongin, South Korea, where she earned her Bachelor's Degree in Theater.

== Career ==
=== Early career ===
Lee began her career as a member of the Theater Company Yeonhui Dangeori (연희단거리패). In 2004, she debuted in the play Mother, portraying young Il-soon under the guidance of veteran actress Son Sook. This play served as the opening performance for the COEX Art Hall. From 2004 to 2006, Lee actively participated in various productions with the troupe, including Acrobat's First Love and Deceived by Love and Crying for Money.

In 2007, Lee moved to Daehangno, Seoul. That year, she auditioned for the play Agnes of God, a production directed by Yoon Kwang-jin and led by veteran actresses Park Jeong-ja and Son Sook. She did not secure a role, despite it being a dream role for her since high school. Undeterred, she auditioned for Lee Kang-baek's The Cockscomb Flower, directed by Choi Joong-min, and successfully landed a role.

Thanks to the performance, she met director and playwright Jang Yu-jeong. This meeting led her to an opportunity to be in a musical production. She was selected as the main lead Choi Min-hee in the fourth season of Jang Yu-jeong's musical Oh, While You Were Sleeping, which was part of Yeonwoo Stage's repertoire. Soon after, she took on the lead character Ahn So-yi in Jang Yu-jeong's play Melodrama. Lee's performances in her previous works caught the attention of director Yoon Kwang-jin. While she was still performing in Melodrama, he offered Lee the role of Agnes in the play Agnes of God. Lee subsequently portrayed Agnes on stage at the Jayu Small Theater in the Seoul Arts Center, beginning December 8.

From 2008 to 2010, Lee collaborated again with Jang Yu-jeong as part of a special team for the musical Oh, While You Were Sleeping. They embarked on a tour across South Korea during that period. That same year, Lee joined the encore performance of Park Su-jin's play Applause for Juliet, directed by Min Bok-ki. The play, which originally premiered in 2004, received acclaim for its vibrant dialogue and imaginative storytelling. Lee portrayed the character of Seon-jeong (Ophelia), alongside Jo Han-chul as Seok-dong (Hamlet), Min-ho as Romeo, and Bok-soon as Juliet. The play explores a complex web of conflicting love in a contemporary setting that combines elements of Hamlet and Romeo and Juliet.

Lee collaborated with Director Seo Jae-hyung and Playwright Han Ah-reum from Theater Company Run to Death (극단-죽도록 달린다) in the premiere of the play Youth, 18 to 1. She played the role of Natsuka, a Japanese woman in love with Kim Kun-woo, a Korean man planning to assassinate the mayor of Tokyo. The play received positive feedback from the audience, but the performance concluded prematurely due to Lee fracturing her foot, three weeks ahead of schedule. After her recovery, in September, she reprised her role as Ahn So-yi in Jang Yu-jeong's play Melodrama.

In late 2008, Lee collaborated once again with director Seo Jae-hyeong and playwright Han Ah-reum in the encore performance of the play Hoya (好夜). This play was selected as part of the 2008 Seoul Foundation for Arts and Culture's stage performance production support project. Lee portrayed the character of Eo Gwi-in, the king's concubine. The play was performed at the Daehakro Theater until November 30.

In 2009, Lee joined Yoji Sakate's acclaimed omnibus play Attic. It was performed as part of the Sakateyoji Festival at the small theater of the Arko Arts Theater in Daehangno, Seoul. That same year, She reprised her role as Natsuka of the play Youth, 18 to 1.

In April 2010, Lee reunited with director Seo Jae-hyeong and playwright Han Ah-reum to portray Jin-kyung in the play Tournament. Once again, she was paired with Jo Han-chul. The play took place at the LG Arts Center as part of the scheduled performances commemorating the 10th anniversary of the venue's opening.

=== Best Play and career in film and television ===
In 2010, Lee made her cinematic debut with a minor role in Jang Yu-jeong's film Finding Mr. Destiny. Her first leading role in a feature film came in 2013 with 48 Meters (released in 2014), directed by Min Baek-doo. 48 Meters is a human rights film based on a true story about North Koreans risking their lives for freedom by crossing the Yalu River, a 48-meter span known as the "distance between life and death." In the film, Lee portrayed Ryu Hwa-young, a character who lost her parents while attempting to escape from North Korea as a child. She starred alongside Park Hyo-joo, who played the role of broker Park Seon-hee.

Lee again worked with Jang Yu-jeong in an encore performance of the musical Those Days. It was performed at the Daehangno Musical Center Grand Theater from October 21 to January 18, 2015.

That same year, Lee was double-cast with actress Lim Kang-hee for the role of Sylvia in an encore performance of the play The Pride. The story unfolded back and forth between 1958 and the present, focusing on Philip, Oliver, Peter, and Sylvia, characters living in two different eras. The play addressed socially underprivileged groups, represented by sexual minorities. Directed by Kim Dong-yeon, the play ran from August 6 at the Daehakro Soohyun Theatre. South Korean adaptation was written by Ji Yi-seon and translated by Kim Soo-bin and premiered in The 5th Best Plays Festival, (Note: The Best Play Festival or Theater Heated Battle (연극열전) is biennale theater festival with the purpose of motivating and enriching the Korean theater industry.) the Art One Theater in 2014.

In 2016, Lee participated in two production of The 6th Best Plays Festival, Kill Me Now and Hamlet—The Play. In Kill Me Now, Lee played the role of Twyla, the younger sister of Jake and aunt of Joy, who takes care of the two. Kill Me Now is the latest work released in 2013 by Canadian playwright Brad Fraser. During its London performance in 2015, the play received critical acclaim from the British press for its honest and bold approach to difficult topics such as sex, disability, and death. Lee performed dual roles as Ophelia and Gertrude in the play Hamlet—The Play. This was a reinterpretation of Shakespeare's classic Hamlet, directed by Kim Dong-yeon, released to commemorate the 400th anniversary of Shakespeare's death. The play was based on a university performance titled "Hamlet —The Story of a Sad Clown," originally adapted and directed by Kim Dong-yeon in 2001. Writer Ji Seon joined the project and created a revised version of the play after 15 years.

In addition to her theater works, Lee took on several minor roles in television dramas. She appeared in the SBS drama Glorious Day (2014), SBS drama Entertainer (2016) and tvN drama Memory (2016). In 2017, she was cast in a supporting role in the MBC mini-series Two Cops, playing Woo Hye-in, the widow of detective Cho Hang-joon and former partner of detective Cha Dong-tak (played by Jo Jung-suk). In 2018, Lee appeared in another MBC drama A Pledge to God, in a supporting role as Na Hae-jim's mother, Ha Ji-mo. She made a return to SBS dramas in 2019 with the series VIP. She portrayed Kang Ji-young, the head of VIP concierge, described as a bold and outspoken woman unafraid of her manager.

In 2016, Lee was double-cast with Son Ji-yoon in the role of Lily, a patient with echolalia in the Asian Premiere of the play Toc Toc. Derived from the French expression for Obsessive-Compulsive Disorder (Troubles Obsessionnels Compulsifs, TOC), Toc Toc is a comedy about obsessive-compulsive patients. The play was written by Laurent Baffie, a French writer, actor, and television host.

In 2017, Lee performed in both Kill Me Now (Theater Black, Chungmu Arts Center until July 16) and The Pride (Daehangno Art One Theater 2, until July 2).

In 2018, Lee participated in The 7th Best Play Festival, featuring the adaptation of The 100-Year-Old Man Who Climbed Out the Window and Disappeared. The play is based on Jonas Jonasson's bestselling Swedish novel with the same name, which had sold over 10 million copies worldwide since its release in 2009. Lee embraced the challenge of portraying multiple characters within the production, showcasing her versatility. The play involved "character juggling," as five actors onstage seamlessly transformed into various roles, including the centenarian protagonist Allan Karlsson and the individuals he encounters. Lee portrayed characters such as the authoritative police chief "Captain Arunson" and Kim Il Sung, among others. This production marked the first time Lee and Son Ji-yoon shared the stage, as their previous projects together typically involved double-casting where they alternated appearances in the play.

Her brief appearance the KBS drama When the Camellia Blooms as the owner of a tanning salon and a friend of Dong-baek was notable. In episode 8 of the KBS drama Sell Your Haunted House (2021), she made a cameo appearance as the mother of Won-gwi Byul-i, a child ghost. Her appearance in episodes 2 and 9 of tvN drama series Hometown Cha-Cha-Cha (2021) as Hye-jin's mother, left lasting impression to viewers. In 2021, Lee also joined the television drama series Here's My Plan (2021) as Kim Bok-hee, a grandmother caregiver. The drama's screenplay won the Outstanding Work award at the 2020 MBC Drama Screenplay Contest and received high praise from the judges. It aired on MBC TV from May 19 to 27, 2021.

=== Recent theater works ===
In 2019, Lee returned to the stage with the play Turn Around and Leave. This two-hander play is based on the 1998 film A Promise, which starred Park Shin-yang and Jeon Do-yeon. It tells the story of Gong Sang-du, a gangster preparing to surrender after committing murder, who meets his lover Hee-joo for a final time.

In 2020, Lee was double-cast as the character "Woman" in Lungs, alongside Kwak Sun-young. Lungs is a two-hander play consisting of a conversation between a man and a woman, who discuss various topics such as emotions, childbirth, the environment, and the state of the Earth.

In May 2022, it was announced that Lee would join the third production of The 9th Best Plays Festival, featuring the play Touching the Void by David Greig. The play is based on the true story of two British mountaineers, Joe Simpson and Simon Yates, and their struggle for survival. Lee was double-cast with actress Son Ji-yoon in the role of Sara, Joe Simpson's sister. The Korean premiere of the play, directed by Kim Dong-yeon, took place at Art One Theater 2 in Daehangno from July 8 to September 9, 2022.

== Personal life ==
Lee Jin-hee met her husband, fellow actor Ahn Se-ho, while working on the Open Run Musical Oh! While You Were Sleeping in 2007. They collaborated on numerous projects thereafter. Both are represented by the same agency, Alien Company.

== Filmography ==
=== Film ===
Year	Title		Role	Notes	Ref.
Year	English	Korean	Role	Notes	Ref.
2010	Finding Mr. Destiny	김종욱 찾기	Female staff	Cameo	
2011	You're My Pet	너는 펫	Yoo Ah-young		
2011	Mr. Idol	Mr. 아이돌	Lee Jin-hee		
2011	Only You	오직 그대만	Ophthalmologist		
2012	Nameless Gangster: Rules of the Time	범죄와의 전쟁: 나쁜놈들 전성시대	Younger sister 3		
2013	All About My Wife	내 아내의 모든 것	Garden party wife		
2014	48m	48미터	Ryu Hwa-young	Main role	
2014	Sinchon Zombie Comics	신촌좀비만화	Female president		
2016	The Great Actor	대배우	Madame		
2018	Family	식구	Mi-ok		
2020	Stone Skipping	돌멩이	Eun-ji's mother		
2021	Escape from Mogadishu	모가디슈	Won Mi-sook		
2022	Honest Candidate 2	정직한 후보 2	Lee Yeon-mi		

=== Television series ===
Key
†	Denotes television productions that have not yet been released

Television series appearances
Year	Title		Role	Notes	Ref.
Year	English	Korean	Role	Notes	Ref.
2009	HD TV Literature Museum: "Son of Man"	hd tv문학관 - 사람의 아들	Ahjumma		
2014	Glorious Day	기분 좋은 날	Ahjumma		
2016	Entertainer	딴따라	Ahjumma		
2016	Memory	기억	Ahjumma		
2017	Two Cops	투깝스	Woo Hye-in		
2018	A Pledge to God	신과의 약속	Hae Ji-mo		
2019	VIP	VIP	Kang Ji-jiyoung		
2020	When the Camellia Blooms	동백꽃 필 무렵	Geum-ok	cameo (ep.1)	
2021	Sell Your Haunted House	대박부동산	Byul's mom	cameo (ep. 8)	
2021	Here's My Plan	목표가 생겼다	Kim Bok-hee	MBC Short Drama	
2021	Hometown Cha-Cha-Cha	갯마을 차차차	Hye-jin's mom	cameo	
2021	KBS Drama Special: "Abyss"	기억들 해각	Mi-sook		
2021–2022	Bulgasal: Immortal Souls	불가살	Sang Un-mo	Cameo	
2022	Why Her	왜 오수재인가?	Seo Jun-myung's wife		
2024	Flex X Cop	재벌X형사	Joo Hwa-young	Cameo (season 1 episode 4–6)	
2026	Doctor X: Mafia in White	닥터X: 하얀 마피아의 시대	Jo Won-jin		

== Stage ==
=== Musical ===
Year	Title		Role	Theater	Date	Ref.
Year	English	Korean	Role	Theater	Date	Ref.
2007	Oh! While You were Sleeping	오 당신이 잠든사이	Choi Min-hee	JTN Art Hall 4	Jan 6 – July 22	
2008–2010	Oh! While You were Sleeping	오 당신이 잠든사이	Choi Min-hee	JTN Art Hall 4	November 4, 2008–February 28, 2010	
2014–2015	Those Days	그날들	Librarian at the Blue House library	Daehangno Musical Center Grand Theater	Oct 21 – January 18, 2015	
2015	Those Days	그날들	Librarian at the Blue House library	Seongnam Art Center Opera House	March 21–22	
2015	Those Days	그날들	Librarian at the Blue House library	Incheon Culture and Arts Center Grand Performance Hall	Feb 7–8	
2015	Those Days	그날들	Librarian at the Blue House library	Daegu Keimyung Art Center	April 4–5	
2015	Those Days	그날들	Librarian at the Blue House library	Jeju Art Center	May 30–31	
2016	Those Days	그날들	Librarian at the Blue House library	Chungmu Art Center Grand Theater	Aug 25 – Nov 3	
2016	Those Days	그날들	Librarian at the Blue House library	Daegu Keimyung Art Center	Nov 12–13	
2016	Those Days	그날들	Librarian at the Blue House library	Centum City Sohyang Theater Shinhan Card Hall Busan	Dec 2–4	
2016	Those Days	그날들	Librarian at the Blue House library	Gyeonggi Arts Center Grand Theater Suwon	Dec 10–11	
2016	Those Days	그날들	Librarian at the Blue House library	Guri Art Hall Cosmos Grand Theater	Dec 16–17	
2016	Those Days	그날들	Librarian at the Blue House library	GS Caltex Yeulmaru Grand Theater Yeosu	Dec 23–25	
2017	Those Days	그날들	Librarian at the Blue House library	Seongnam Art Center Opera House	Jan 21–22	
2017	Those Days	그날들	Librarian at the Blue House library	Seoul Arts Center Opera Theater	Feb 7 – March 5	
2018–2019	Those Days	그날들	Librarian at the Blue House library	Centum City Sohyang Theater Shinhan Card Hall Busan	Dec 23–30	
2018–2019	Those Days	그날들	Librarian at the Blue House library	Daejeon Arts Center Art Hall	Jan 5–6	
2018–2019	Those Days	그날들	Librarian at the Blue House library	Blue Square Shinhan Card Hall Busan	Feb 22 – May 6	
2018–2019	Those Days	그날들	Librarian at the Blue House library	Gyeongsangnam-do Culture and Arts Center Grand Performance Hall Guri	June 7–8	
2023	Those Days	그날들	Librarian at the Blue House library	Seoul Arts Center	July 12 to September 3	

=== Theater ===
List of stage play(s)
Year	Title		Role	Theater	Date	Ref.
Year	English	Korean	Role	Theater	Date	Ref.
2004	Deceived by Love and Crying for Money	사랑에 속도 돈에 울고	Hong-do	—		
2004	Acrobat's First Love	곡예사의 첫사랑	Seon-ju	National Theater Sky Theater	Aug 10–29	
2004	Son Sook's Mother	손숙의 어머니	Il-soon (young) et al.	COEX Art Hall	Sep 10 – Oct 2	
2006	Joseon Coalition Scandal Hoya	조선 연정 스캔들 호야	Gwi-in	Miryang Theater Village	July 21 – Aug 1	
2007	The Cockscomb Flower	맨드라미꽃	Joo-hye	Daehangno Black Box Theater	Jan 12–28	
2007	Melodrama	멜로드라마	Ahn So-yi	Daehak-ro Cultural Space Ida 2 Hall	Sep 8 – Nov 4	
2007	Agnes of God	신의 아그네	Agnes	Seoul Arts Center Jayu Small Theater	Dec 8–30	
2008	Applause for Julie	줄리에게 박수를	Seon-jeong (Ophelia)	Doosan Art Center Space 111	March 8 – May 5	
2008	Youth, 18 to 1: Doosan Art Center Creator Development Program 2	청춘, 18대 1: 두산아트센터 창작자 육성 프로그램 2	Natsuka	Doosan Art Center Space 111	July 12 – Aug 31	
2008	Melodrama	멜로드라마	Ahn So-yi	Daehak-ro T.O.M. Hall 2	Sep 5 – Nov 2	
2008	Joseon Coalition Scandal Hoya	조선 연정 스캔들 호야	Gwi-in	Daehakro Theater	Nov 14–30	
2009	Youth, 18 to 1	청춘, 18대 1	Natsuka	Doosan Art Center Space111	Feb 24 – March 15	
2009	Sakateyoji Festival - Attic	사카테요지 페스티벌 - 다락방	Female	Arko Arts Theater Small Theater	June 8–28	
2010	Tournament	토너먼트		LG Arts Center	April 20–25	
2010	Road to Santiago	산티아고 가는 길	Kite	Yeonwoo Small Theater (Dahak-ro)	Nov 19 – Dec 5	
2012	Scorched Love	그을린 사랑	Female	Myeongdong Arts Theater	June 5 – July 1	
2013	Full Line	만선 자유연극시리즈 1	Female	Seoul Arts Center Jayu Small Theater	May 3–15	
2014	SAC CUBE 2014 - Mephisto	SAC CUBE 2014 - 메피스토	Gretchen	Seoul Arts Center CJ Towol Theater	April 4–19	
2014	The Height of The Multiple	배수의 고도	Shoko Ando	Doosan Art Center Space 111	June 10 – July 5	
2015	The Caucasian Chalk Circle	코카서스의 백묵원	Female	Sogang University Mary Hall Grand Theater	April 24 – May 3	
2015	The Pride	프라이드	Sylvia	Yes 24 Stage 3	Aug 8 – Nov 1	
2016	Theatrical Battle 6 - Kill Me Now	연극열전6 - 킬 미 나우	Twila	Chungmu Art Center Medium Theater Black	May 1 – July 3	
2016	Theatrical Battle 6 - Hamlet the Play	연극열전6 - 세 번째 작품 "햄릿 - 더 플레이"	Ophelia & Gertrude	Chungmu Art Center Medium Theater Black	Aug 2 – Oct 16	
2016–2017	Theatrical Battle 6 - Toc Toc	연극열전6 - 톡톡	Lily	Daehak-ro T.O.M. Hall 2	Oct 27 – January 30, 2017	
2017	The Pride	프라이드	Sylvia	Art One Theater Hall 2	March 21 – July 2	
2017	Kill Me Now	킬 미 나우	Twila	Chungmu Art Center Medium Theater Black	April 25 – July 16	
2017–2018	Toc Toc	톡톡	Lily	Daehak-ro T.O.M. Hall 2	Oct 20 – January 28, 2018	
2018	Theatre 7 - The 100-year-old man who jumped out of the window and ran away	연극열전7 - 창문 넘어 도망친 100세 노인연극열전	Alan	Daehak-ro Jayu Theater	June 12 – Sep 2	
2018	Turn Around and Leave	돌아서서 떠나라	Chae Hee-joo	Bricks Theater (Old, Content Ground)	July 12 – Oct 6	
2018–2019	Bunker Trilogy	벙커 트릴로지	soldier 4	Hongik University Daehangno Art Center Small Theater	December 11, 2018–February 24, 2019	
2019	Turn Around and Leave	돌아서서 떠나라	Chae Hee-joo	Bricks Theater (Old, Content Ground)	Oct 9 – Nov 11	
2020	Theatrical Battle 8 - Lungs	연극열전8 - 렁스	W	Art One Theater Hall 2	March 9 – July 5	
2021	Lungs	렁스	W	Art One Theater Hall 2	June 26 – September 5	
2021	Lungs	렁스	W	Sarasae Theater in Aram Nuri, Goyang	December 11–12	
2022	Theatrical Battle 9 - Touching The Void	연극열전9_3rd — 터칭 더 보이드	Sara	Art One Theater Hall 2	July 8 – Sep 18	
2023	Bread	빵야		LG Art Centre Seoul U+ Stage	January 32–February 26	
2023	Bread	빵야		Online	May 2	
2024	Closer	클로저	Anna	Plus Theater	April 23 to July 14	

== Awards and nominations ==
List of Award(s) and Nomination(s)
Year	Award ceremony	Category	Nominee / Work	Result	Ref.
2016	The Interpark Golden Ticket Awards (Note: The Golden Ticket Awards (골든티켓어워즈) is an awards ceremony that selects works and people who have shown the best ticket power by performance genre during the year. Since 2005, Interpark has held an awards ceremony by adding up ticket sales, ranking scores, and online voting for each year at the end of the year.)	Best Actress in a Play	Turn Around and Leave	Nominated	12th
2017	The Interpark Golden Ticket Awards	Best Actress in a Play	The Pride	Nominated	13th
2018	The Interpark Golden Ticket Awards	Best Actress in a Play	Bunker Trilogy	Nominated	14th
2022–2023	The Interpark Golden Ticket Awards	Best Actress in a Play	Touching the Void	Nominated	17th
