= Shin Sung-min =

South Korean actor (born 1985)

- Born: Seo Sung-min; October 31, 1985 (age 40); South Korea
- Education: Kyung Hee University (Department of Theatre and Film)
- Occupation: Actor
- Years active: 1998–present
- Agent: Goodman Story
- Spouse: Jo In (m. 2025)

Korean name
- Hangul: 서성민
- RR: Seo Seongmin
- MR: Sŏ Sŏngmin

Stage name
- Hangul: 신성민
- RR: Sin Seongmin
- MR: Sin Sŏngmin

Seo Sung-min (Korean: 서성민; born October 31, 1985), better known by the stage name Shin Sung-min (신성민), is a South Korean actor known for his work in musicals, theater, and television.

In 2018, he ventured into screen acting with a minor role as a driver in the JTBC drama Life, and went on to play supporting roles in the SBS drama Your Honor as Park Jae-hyung and the KBS2 drama Matrimonial Chaos as Baek Chan-jin. In 2020, he appeared in the MBC drama The Game: Towards Zero as Yoon Kang-jae.

== Career ==
In 2010, during his senior year in college, Shin Seong-min auditioned for the musical Grease at the recommendation of his classmate Lee Dong-ha. He landed his first role on stage as Sonny, a part that had been vacant for just a week. However, this didn't feel like an official debut for him, as the circumstances were somewhat serendipitous. Although it was a valuable learning experience, Shin realized his shortcomings as a musical actor at the time.

Just as Shin was beginning to question his fit in the world of musicals, the production of Oh! While You Were Sleeping captivated him. He described it as a "revelation," saying "I couldn't believe a musical could blend dance, song, and intense drama so seamlessly!" Filled with excitement, he auditioned and was cast as Dr. Lee, finding a sense of pride in his stage performance. "It was a production that underscored the significance of the stage. It prompted a shift in my perspective and reignited my passion for musicals."

Shin's career began to take off after that, as he appeared in a series of successful productions. In 2012, he was cast as the lead character Saddam in the musical Pungwolju, which allowed him to showcase his acting depth and maturity. He later took on challenging roles in productions like Finding Kim Jong-wook, The Goddess is Watching, and Thrill Me, demonstrating his versatility and growth as a performer.

In 2013, Shin expanded his acting career beyond musicals and into plays. He played the role of Hans in the 10th Anniversary performance of Kim Dong-yeon's play Fantasy Fairy Tale. Shin shared the role of Hans with Kim Ho-jin and Kim Bo-geun in this special anniversary production. Shin's casting as one of the actors playing Hans showcases his involvement in this long-running and acclaimed play. The 10th anniversary performance of the play 'Fantasy Fairy Tale' performed at the main theater of Daehakro Arts Theater from December 6 until 15.

Shin said, "How much it touches my heart is always the criterion for choosing a work," both emphasized the deep power contained in the script.

The play Kill Me Now, which premiered in 2016 through Theatrics 6, performed again in 2017 with the original cast and some new additions. The play, written by Brad Fraser, explores sensitive topics like disability and euthanasia through the lens of an individual's life and family. In this production, the role of Joy played by two actors - Shin and Yoon Na-moo. Shin's involvement in this play represents his continued growth as an actor, branching out from his musical theater background into the realm of dramatic plays. His portrayal of the role of Joy will be a key part of this re-staged production of "Kill Me Now."

In 2017, Shin signed a contract with L&N Company.

In 2019, Shin reunited with Kim Dong-yeon in musical Sideureus. He was triple-cast in role Kepler with Jeong Wook-jin and Shin Joo-hyeop.

After finishing Sideureus, Shin was offered role in the historical musical Annals of King Gyeongjong. This historical role, portraying the character Gyeongjong, was an interesting new challenge for Shin, as he had never done a period piece before. Shin has been focused on developing his acting abilities, and he sees the historical drama as a chance to expand his skills, particularly in terms of specialized speaking styles. He has been captivated by the theatrical elements and visual beauty of the production. Taking on these unfamiliar roles has pushed Shin out of his comfort zone, but he is embracing the opportunity to grow as an actor.

In 2021, Shin made his comeback to theatre in January 2021 in Jang Jin's two-hander play Ice, in which he played Detective Lee Jong-ryeol trying to inculpate a young man in a murder case. The play performed at S Theater, Sejong Center for the Performing Arts. Despite the challenges faced by the performing arts industry due to the COVID-19 pandemic, the play continued to draw audiences. On May 16, 2021, Shin reprised his role as Detective Lee Jong-ryeol, opposite veteran actor Jung Woong-in, in special encore play Ice, as second performance of "2021 Play Ten Thousand Won Series", at Seongnam Arts Center.

Shin was back to meet musical audience as role visitor in Midnight: Actor Musician.

Shin made a comeback to the theater in May 2022, participating in the third installment of The 9th Best Plays Festival, (Note: The Best Play Festival or Theater Heated Battle (연극열전) is a biennial theater festival hosted by The Best Plays Inc. The establishment of The Best Plays Inc. in 2007 was a result of the resounding success of The 1st Best Plays Festival in 2004. The festival, originally initiated by Dongsoong Art Center Theatre Company, signaled a paradigm shift for Korean theater by showcasing young directors and popular stars. The festival's goals include producing outstanding Korean plays as part of our repertoire, supporting new plays and playwrights, and introducing remarkable plays from around the world with the purpose of motivating and enriching the Korean theater industry.) Touching the Void by David Greig. It is based on the true story of the survival of two British mountain climbers, Joe Simpson and Simon Yates. Shin was triple casts with Kim Seon-ho and Lee Hwi-jong for the role of Joe Simpson. The Korean premiere, directed by Kim Dong-yeon, was performed at Art One Theater 2 in Daehangno from July September 8 to 18, 2022.

In 2024, Shin signed an exclusive contract with Goodman Story.

== Personal life ==
Shin and Jo In were getting married on May 12, 2025, in a small ceremony with only family present.

== Filmography ==
=== Television ===
Year	Title	Role	Note	Ref.
2018	Life	Driver	Debut in minor role (JTBC Drama)	
2018	Your Honor	Park Jae-hyung	Supporting role (SBS Drama)	
2018	Matrimonial Chaos	Baek Chan-jin	Supporting role (KBS2 Drama)	
2020	The Game: Towards Zero	Yoon Kang-jae	Supporting role (MBC Drama)	

== Stage ==
=== Concert ===
Concert play performances
Year	Title		Role	Theater	Date	Ref.
Year	English	Korean	Role	Theater	Date	Ref.
2014	Musical Story Show 10th Anniversary with Lee Seok-jun	뮤지컬 이야기쇼 이석준과 함께 10주년	Special Appearance		May 26	
2014	Gloomy Day Concert	글루미데이 콘서트	Guest	Yes24 Stage 1	August 4, 2014	
2014	Musical Talk Concert Who Am I 16	뮤지컬토크콘서트 Who Am I 16	Guest	Olympus Hall	September 25, 2014	
2015	Gloomy's Praise Day Concert	Gloomy사의찬미Day	Guest	Yes24 Stage 1	August 3, 2015	
2016	2016 Legendary Concert	2016 전설의 콘써트with 집들이	Guest	TOM Theater 1	January 7, 2016 - January 10, 2016	
2017	Thanks Concert	감사 콘서트	Guest	TOM Theater 1	February 1, 2017 - February 5, 2017	
2019	Puberty Concert -1st Reunion	사춘기 콘서트	Lui	Seoul Christian University Performing Arts Center SKON2	May 27, 2019	
2020	Space	공간	Special Appearance	Seoul Kyung Hee University Performing Arts Center SKON2	July 22, 2020 - July 26, 2020	
2022	Lee Bum-jae Piano Concert <The Warmth of Warmth>	이범재 피아노 콘서트	Military	Perigee Hall	November 21, 2022 - December 5, 2022	
2023	ISHOW WEEK	이쇼 위크	Guest		November 12	

=== Musical ===
Musical play performances
Year	Title		Role	Theater	Date	Ref.
Year	English	Korean	Role	Theater	Date	Ref.
2010	Grease	그리스	Sonny			
2010	Oh! While You Were Sleeping	오! 당신이 잠든 사이	Dr. Lee	JTN Arts Hall 2	April 30, 2010 - April 8, 2012	
2012	Pungwolju	풍월주	Saddam	Plus Theater (formerly Culture Space N YOU)	May 4, 2012 - August 2, 2012	
2012	Finding Kim Jong-wook	김종욱 찾기	Kim Jong-wook & First Love	CGV Shinhan Card Art Hall (formerly CGV Pop Art Hall)	November 7, 2012 - January 6, 2013	
2013	Pungwolju	풍월주	Saddam	Dongsung Arts Center Dongsung Hall	November 9, 2013 - February 16, 2014	
2013	Thrill Me	쓰릴 미	Me	The STAGE	May 17, 2013 - October 6, 2013	
2013	The Goddess is Watching	여신님이 보고 계셔	Ryu Soon-ho	Chungmu Arts Center Small Theater Blue	January 15, 2013 - March 10, 2013	
2014	Gloomy Day	글루미데이	Office worker	Yes24 Stage 1	February 28, 2014 - April 27, 2014	
2014	Thrill Me	쓰릴 미	He and I	Uniplex 2	August 8, 2014 - October 26, 2014	
2014–2015	Thrill Me	쓰릴 미	He and I	Lifeway Hall, Building 2, Daemyung Culture Factory	December 10, 2014 - March 1, 2015	
2015	Gloomy Day	Gloomy사의찬미Day	Office worker	Yes24 Stage 1	August 3, 2015	
2015	Adolescence	사춘기	Yeong-min	Chungmu Arts Center Small Theater Black	November 21, 2014 - February 15, 2015	
2019	Sidereus	시데레우스	Kepler	Chungmu Arts Center Small Theater Black	April 17, 2019 - June 30, 2019	
2019	Annals of King Gyeongjong	경종수정실록	Prince Yeonning	TOM Theater 1	October 27, 2019 - January 12, 2020	
2020	Midnight	미드나잇	Visitor	Yes24 Stage 3	April 11, 2020 - June 28, 2020	
2021	Midnight	미드나잇	Visitor	TOM Theater 1	March 2, 2021 - May 30, 2021	
2021	Maybe Happy Ending	어쩌면 해피엔딩	Military	Yes24 Stage	June 22, 2021 - September 5, 2021	
2021	Annals of King Gyeongjong	경종수정실록	Prince Yeonning	Art One Theatre 1	September 5, 2021 - November 21, 2021	
2021	Maybe Happy Ending Live	어쩌면 해피엔딩 라이브	Oliver	Online	November 15, 2021 - November 29, 2021	
2021–2022	Gone Tomorrow	곤 투모로우	Han Jeonghun	Hongik University Daehangno Arts Center Main Theater	December 4, 2021 - February 27, 2022	
2022	Western Story	웨스턴 스토리	Wyatt Erp	Interpark Uniplex	March 4, 2022 - May 22, 2022	
2022	Gwangju	광주	Park Han-soo	Seoul Arts Center CJ Towol Theatre	April 15, 2022 - May 1, 2022	
2022	Gwangju	광주	Park Han-soo	Gwangju Biennale Exhibition Hall	May 14, 2022 - May 15, 2022	
2022	Gwangju	광주	Park Han-soo	Sejong Center for the Performing Arts	September 17, 2022 - September 18, 2022	
2022–2023	If Then	이프덴	Josh	Hongik University Daehangno Arts Center Main Theater	December 8, 2022 - February 26, 2023	
2023	The Red Book	레드북	Brown	Hongik University Daehangno Arts Center Main Theater	March 14, 2023 - May 28, 2023	
2023	Gone Tomorrow	곤 투모로우	Han Jeonghun	Kwanglim Art Center BBCH Hall	August 10, 2023 - October 22, 2023	
2023	Showman	쇼맨	Nebula	National Jeongdong Theatre	September 15, 2023 - November 12, 2023	
2023–2024	Il Tenore	일 테노레	Lee Su-han	Seoul Arts Center CJ Towol Theatre	December 19, 2023 - February 25, 2024	
2024	Il Tenore	일 테노레	Lee Su-han	Blue Square Shinhan Card Hall	March 29, 2024 - May 19, 2024	
2024	Classic	클래식	Jun-ha	CJ Azit Daehangno	July 22 and 23	

=== Theater ===
Theater play performances of Shin
Year	Title		Role	Venue	Date	Ref.
Year	English	Korean	Role	Venue	Date	Ref.
2013	Fantasy Fairy Tale	환상동화	Hans	Art One Theater 3	March 1, 2013 - May 26, 2013	
2013	Fantasy Fairy Tale	환상동화	Hans	Daehangno Arts Theater Main Theater	December 6, 2013 - December 15, 2013	
2015	The Best Play 6 - Army on the Tree	연극열전6 - 나무 위의 군대	Private	Seoul Arts Center Open Theater	December 19, 2015 - February 28, 2016	
2016	Capone Trilogy	카포네 트릴로지	Young Man	Hongik University Daehangno Arts Center Small Theater	July 5, 2016 - September 18, 2016	
2016–2017	Bunker Trilogy	벙커 트릴로지	Soldier 2	Hongik University Daehangno Arts Center Small Theater	December 6, 2016 - February 19, 2017	
2017	Judo Boy	유도소년	Min-wook	Yes24 Stage 3	March 4, 2017 - May 14, 2017	
2017	Kill Me Now	킬 미 나우	Joy	Chungmu Arts Center Small Theater Black	April 25, 2017 - July 16, 2017	
2018	Bunker Trilogy	벙커 트릴로지	Soldier 2	Hongik University Daehangno Arts Center Small Theater	December 11, 2018 - February 24, 2019	
2019	The Picture of Dorian Gray	도리안 그레이의 초상	Eugene	Interpark Uniplex	September 6, 2019 - November 10, 2019	
2020	Pride and Prejudice	오만과 편견	A2	Yes24 Stage 3	September 19, 2020 - November 29, 2020	
2021	Ice	얼음	Detective 2 Lee Jong-ryeol	Sejong Center S Theater	January 8, 2021 - March 21, 2021	
2021	Pride and Prejudice	오만과 편견	A2	Goyang Oulim Nuri Byeolmorae Theater	April 24, 2021 - April 25, 2021	
2021	Ice	얼음	Detective 2	Seongnam Arts Center Ensemble Theater	May 14, 2021 - May 16, 2021	
2022	Touching the Void	터칭 더 보이드	Joe	Art One Theatre 2	July 8, 2022 - September 18, 2022	
2024	Self-reliance Diary	자립일기	—	Dongsoong Stage Small TheaterTheater	July 6–7	
