= Son Ji-yoon =

South Korean actor (born 1983)

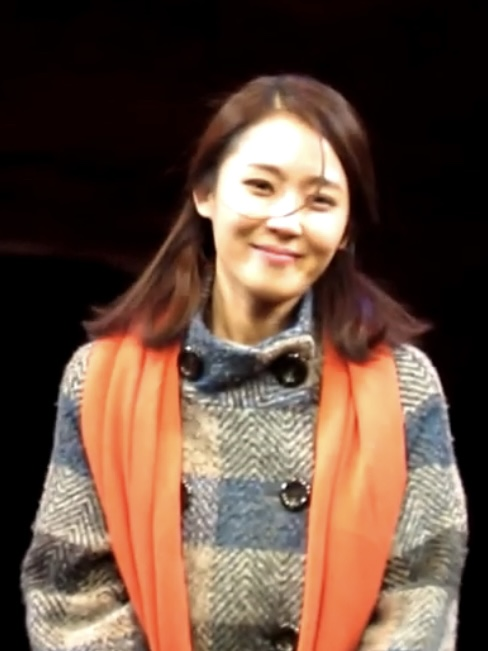
- Son in 2013
- Born: Son Su-jeong (손수정); February 18, 1983 (age 43); Seoul, South Korea
- Education: Bachelor Degree of Theater
- Occupation: Actress
- Years active: 2007–present
- Agent: Big Boss Entertainment
- Spouse: Sung Tae-joon (m. 2013)

Korean name
- Hangul: 손지윤
- RR: Son Jiyun
- MR: Son Chiyun

Former name
- Hangul: 손수정
- RR: Son Sujeong
- MR: Son Sujŏng

Son Ji-yoon (Korean: 손지윤; born February 18, 1983), born Son Su-jeong, is a South Korean actress. She made her debut in the play Sea Fog in 2007. She primarily focusing on theater plays and some musicals in her portfolio. Starting from 2017, Son began taking on minor roles in films and television dramas.

Son's prominence as an actress in Daehangno is evident through her two nominations and one award as Best Supporting Actress at the StageTalk Audience's Choice Awards (SACA). She was nominated for Best Supporting Actress at SACA in 2016 for her roles in Gloria and Toc Toc. Son received another nomination at SACA in 2018 for Best Supporting Actress in the play The Helmet. She won the SACA Best Supporting Actress award in 2019 for her role as Sylvia in the play The Pride.

== Early years and education ==
Son Ji-yoon, born Son Su-jeong on February 18, 1983, in Seoul. She attended an all-girls high school. Known for her talkative nature, her friends encouraged her to enroll in a theater and film department. Taking their advice to heart, she prepared for three months and successfully passed the entrance exam.

During her studies, Son attended her first play, Our Town, and was captivated by the experience of performing on stage, wearing costumes, and portraying another character. From that moment, she earnestly aspired to become an actress. Although she was not always a diligent student and often missed classes, Son consistently attended theater workshop sessions and dedicated her vacations to working on performances, spending the majority of her time in academic and theatrical settings. This experience solidified her desire to pursue a career as a theater actress.

== Career ==
=== Early career ===
A year after graduating, Son joined the Yeonwoo Theater Company. (Note: Yeonwoo Stage (연우무대를), which means 'playing friend', started as a small group on February 5, 1977, and is Korea's representative theater company that has led the revitalization of creative plays in the Korean theater world. From the days of Sinchon to the present in Hyehwa-dong, Yeonwoo Stage has been working hard to realize the complete stage of novel creative works.) Within six months, she debuted as a theater actress in the 2007 play Haemoo (also known as Sea Fog).

In 2008, Son was cast as Louise Hamilton in the play Loving You, a Korean adaptation of Ray Cooney and Gene Stone's Why Not Stay for Breakfast. Produced by Papa Productions, its Korean premiere ran at the Happy Theater in Daehangno from July 11 to August 31. This marked her first leading role, performed under director Lee Hyun-gyu alongside veteran actor Hong Sung-duk.

In 2009, Son joined the cast of Gil Sambongdeum as Maeng-hwa. This work was a collaboration between writer Kim Min-jung and director Ahn Kyung-mo, who had previously worked together on the 2007 play Haemoo. The play was produced by Yeonwoo Theater Company and Namsan Arts Center as part of the Namsan Arts Center's 2009 Season Program.

In late 2009, Son co-starred alongside Min Jun-ho in the romantic comedy play A Dramatic Night. She portrayed Si-hoo, while Min Jun-ho played Jeong-hoon. The play explored the subtle psychological changes between its male and female leads, focusing on a one-night stand. The Yeonwoo Theater Company presented this performance, which was written by Hwang Yun-jeong and selected for the 2009 New Year's Literary Arts Festival. The play was directed by Lee Jae-jun, who had won both Best Director and Best Picture at the 2007 Miryang Summer Performing Arts Festival's Young Director's Home Awards. A Dramatic Night premiered at Yeonwoo Theater in Daehangno, running from December 16, 2009, to January 17, 2010.

In 2010, Son auditioned for the play Rooftop House Cat, an adaptation of a web novel previously made into an MBC drama series of the same name. She was triple-cast as Nam Jeong-eun, the female lead, alongside Hwang Bo-ra and Kim Yeo-jin, in the play's first season. The play was directed by Kim Tae-hyung, with Sung Tae-joon playing opposite Son as Lee Kyung-Min. Also in 2010, Son reunited with Sung Tae-joon for an encore performance of the play A Dramatic Night. Sung was double-cast as Jeong-hoon, a role previously shared with Min Jun-ho in the premiere. Son reprised her role as Si-hoo, sharing it with Yoon Jeong-sun.

In 2011, Son again collaborated with Min Jun-ho, who served as director for the play If With You. Written by Japanese playwright Koki Mitani, If With You (2011) was part of the 'Best Plays' Repertoire'. Son played the supporting role of Koiso Fujimi, the youngest sister of the Koiso family. The comedy centers on the love story between a 70-year-old gentleman and a 28-year-old lady. Its episodes unfold through lies that entangle the characters. This performance had an encore run in Gangnam following its initial presentation in Daehangno.

=== Musical theatre works ===
In 2012, Son debuted as a musical actress in a supporting role in the musical Rude Miss Young-ae. This creative musical, produced by CJ E&M after two years of preparation, was based on the long-running tvN drama series Rude Miss Young-ae. It also served as the final work of the late playwright Ahn Hyeon-jeong. Son reprised her role in two revival productions in 2013.

In 2014, Son joined the musical production of Two Weddings and a Funeral, which was an adaptation of the film of the same name. Playwright Cho Min-ju was in charge in writing the adaptation. It was directed by Kim Tae-hyung. The story centered on Hyo-jin, a lesbian, who enters into a marriage of convenience with Min-soo, a gay general hospital doctor, to adopt a child. Son and actress Cha Su-yeon shared the role of Hyo-jin, while Jung Dong-hwa and Park Seong-hoon shared Min-soo's role.

=== Theater Ganda ===
In 2013, Son reunited with Min Jun-ho for the premiere of his play Me and Grandpa. The play had a reading performance at the Namsan Drama Festival on February 21, 2013. Son shared the role of Jun-hee's grandmother with Jeong Seon-ah, who had participated in the reading performance alongside Jin Seon-gyu (as grandfather), Oh Eui-sik (as Jun-hee), and Lee Seok (as writer). The cast for the premiere included Oh Yong-lee (as grandfather), Hong Woo-jin (as Jun-hee), and Yang Kyung-won (as writer). It ran from July 11 to August 4 at the Daehangno Information Center.

In the end of the same year, Son was invited as one of representative actress of Daehak-ro, in 'Ganda GO', a project by the Ganda theater company, as part of their 10th-anniversary celebration. The first work presented was Almost Maine by John Cariani. Following Almost, Maine, the play Me and Grandpa was selected as the second work for 'Ganda GO'. It ran from February 7, 2014, at Art One Theater 3 in Daehak-ro, Dongsung-dong, Jongno District, Seoul. Son reprised her role, performing both the grandmother and multiple other characters.

=== Working with Kim Tae-hyung/No Name ===
In 2013, Son collaborated once again with Director Kim Tae-hyun in play The Age of Love (2013), which was an adaptation of Hisashi Nozawa's best-selling Japanese novel. She shared the leading female role of Haru, a sports center instructor, with actresses Hwang In-young and Shim Eun-jin.

In 2014, Son had her first collaboration with the Noname Theater Company (Note: Noname Theater Company is a theater company founded in 2010 by Musical Haven, a performance production company well known for musical Thrill Me. Noname Theater Company is an organization that produces and performs plays focusing on contemporary English and American plays. The theater company Noname Theater Company, which consists of a production team and a creative team, selects good works to present high-quality performances, and ultimately aims to develop creative performances.) for the Korean premiere of Fight of Cocks written by a young British playwright Mike Bartlett. The play explores the weighty subject of "subjectivity and choice" through the character of John, who must make a decision between a man and a woman due to gender identity confusion. The play garnered attention during its UK premiere in 2009 for its cast, including Ben Whishaw. It won the Lawrence Olivier Award in 2010, and was performed off-Broadway in New York in 2012. In the Korean production, actor Park Eun-seok was cast as John and Son Ji-yoon appeared as W, John's new lover of the opposite sex. The other cast members included Kim Jun-won and Seon Jong-nam. The play ran at Doosan Art Center Space 111 in Seoul from July 11 to August 3, 2014, and received a warm response.

She collaborated with the NoName Theater Company for their sixth production, the Korean premiere of the play Metamorphoses (2015). The work was reconstructed by the renowned American playwright Mary Zimmerman, based on the epic poem "Metamorphoses" by the ancient Roman poet Ovid, which delves into Greek and Roman mythology. The play received major accolades such as the Tony Awards and the Drama Desk Awards in 2022. Directed by Byun Jeong-Ju, the Korean adaptation premiered at the Little Theater of the Seoul Arts Center.

In 2016, Son reunited with Director Kim Tae-hyun for the Korean premiere of the play Gloria, the work of the playwright Branden Jacobs-Jenkins. The play had been nominated for the 2016 Pulitzer Prize and was co-produced by the Noname Theater Company and Dosan Art Center. Son portrayed the female lead, Kendra, opposite actor Won Won-jo as Rorin. The other cast members included Oh Jung-taek as Miles and Gong Ji-ji as Annie. Son's portrayal of Gloria earned her a nomination for Best Theater Actress at the 2016 SACA award.

In 2016, Son joined The 6th Best Plays Festival. She was double cast with actress Lee Jin-hee in the role of Lily, a patient with echolalia in Asian Premiere of play Toc Toc. Derived from the English expression of OCD (Troubles Obsessionnels Compulsifs, TOC), Toc Toc is a riotous comedy about obsessive-compulsive patients. The play was written by Laurent Baffie, a famous French writer, actor, and TV show host.

In 2017, Son reprised her role as W in the encore performance of Fight of Cocks alongside fellow actor Seon Jong-nam, who played F in the original premiere. Lee Myung-haeng and Lee Tae-goo joined the production as new cast members. During the same year, Son also returned for the reenactment of Gloria in 2017, which was performed at Art One Theater 3 from July 14 to August 13.

In 2018, Lee participated in The 7th Best Play Festival. She acted in the adaptation of The 100-Year-Old Man Who Climbed Out the Window and Disappeared. The play is based on Jonas Jonasson's bestselling Swedish novel with the same name, which has sold over 10 million copies worldwide since its release in 2009. Son challenged herself of portraying multiple characters. The ensemble also included Lee Jin-hee, Seo Hyeon-cheol, Oh Yong, Jang Yi-joo, Yang So-min, Kim Do-bin, Ju Min-jin, Kwon Dong-ho, and Lee Hyung-hoon. The play involved "character juggling" as five actors onstage seamlessly transformed into various roles, including the centenarian protagonist Alan and the individuals he encounters. Son portrayed characters such as elephant, a gang boss, a director, a guard, also 'Allan 3'. This production marked the first time Son and Lee Jin-hee shared a stage. In their previous projects together, They usually engaged in double casting, alternating their appearances in the play.

In 2018, Son participated in the 4th encore performance of Capone Trilogy at the Hongik University Daehak-ro Art Center. She shared the role of Lady with actress Kim Ji-hyun and Choi Yu-ha. The other cast members included Lee Seok-jun, Kim Jong-tae, and Kim Joo-hyun, who played the role of Oldman. The role of Young-man was shared by Kim Do-bin, Kang Jung-woo, and Yoon Na-mu. Capone Trilogy is based on the original work of Jamie Wilkes, a writer who has gained popularity in British literature through works like Bunker Trilogy and Frontier Trilogy.

=== Recent works ===
In 2019, Son shared the role of Sylvia with actress Shin Jeong-won in the 4th Korean encore performance of the play The Pride. Directed by Kim Dong-yeon, the play explores the experiences of social underprivileged groups, particularly sexual minorities, spanning different eras from 1958 to the present. The production took place at Art One Theater 2 in Daehangno from May 25 to August 25. The Pride is the debut work of Greek-British author Alexi Kaye Campbell, which premiered in 2008 at the Royal Court Theatre Upstairs and received critical acclaim. The South Korean adaptation, written by Ji Yi-seon and translated by Kim Soo-bin, premiered at The 5th Best Plays Festival (Note: Best Play Festival or Theater Heated Battle (연극열전) is biennale theater festival with the purpose of motivating and enriching the Korean theater industry.) at Art One Theater in 2014.

In 2020, Son Ji-yoon portrayed the dual roles of Daisy and Claire in Wife, a play by British playwright Samuel Adamson. The production, presented by the Seoul Metropolitan Theater Company, featured a talented ensemble cast including Lee Joo-young, Oh Yong, Baek Seok-gwang, Jung-hwan, Woo Beom-jin, and Song Gwang-il. Directed by Shin Yoo-chung, the play explores the growth of women and evolving perspectives on sexual minorities. It begins in the last scene of Henrik Ibsen's A Doll's House and spans four eras from 1959 to 2042. The encore performance of Wife was staged at the S Theater, Sejong Center for the Performing Arts from July 30 to August 2, 2020. Son reprised the role from August 8 to 23 at Daehakro Arts Theater Grand Theater.

In 2021, Son joined korean production of Kunio Shimizu's play The Dressing Room (Gakuya). Son and actress Woo Jung-won shared role of C. C when she was alive portrays Nina, which is a character who constantly memorizes lines in the dressing room and maintains a state of tension.

In May 2022, it was announced that Son would be joining the third production of The 9th Best Plays Festival. The play is titled Touching the Void by David Greig. and is based on the true story of the survival of two British mountain climbers, Joe Simpson and Simon Yates. Joe Simpson and Simon Yates. Son was double casts with actress Lee Jin-hee for role Sara, Joe Simpson's sister. The Korean premiere was directed by Kim Dong-yeon, one of the most notable directors in the Korean performance industry. It was performed at Art One Theater 2 in Daehangno from July 8 to September 9, 2022.

Son was cast in the role of Treat in Lyle Kessler's play Orphans, alongside Choi Yu-ha, Park Jeong-bok, and Choi Seok-jin. The gender-blind casting play opened on November 29, 2022, and ran at Art One Theatre 1 in Daehak-ro until February 26 of the following year.

== Personal life ==
On November 24, 2013, Son married actor Sung Tae-jun. Their relationship began in 2010 after she met her future husband in the 2010 plays Rooftop House Cat and Dramatic Night, where they both played as a couple.

== Filmography ==
=== Film ===
List of film(s)
Year	Title		Role	Ref.
Year	English	Korean	Role	Ref.
2017	Method	메소드	Theater Audience	
2018	The Princess and the Matchmaker	궁합	Songhwa Palace Court Lady	
2019	Like The First Drink	첫잔처럼	Seo Ji-hye	
2021	Double Patty	더블패티	Son Ji-yoon	

=== Television ===
List of television drama(s)
Year	Title		Role	Note	Ref.
Year	English	Korean	Role	Note	Ref.
2018	Ms. Hammurabi	미스 함무라비	Lee Myung-soo's wife	Guest appearance	
2019	Stranger 2	비밀의 숲 2	Seo Dong-jae's office manager	Guest appearance	
2020	Missing: The Other Side	미씽: 그들이 있었다	Ha-neul's Mother	Guest appearance (Ep. 1–2)	
2020	Traps	트랩	Autopsy Doctor	Guest appearance	
2022–2023	The First Responders	소방서 옆 경찰서	Yoon Hong	Season 1–2	
2023	Miraculous Brothers	기적의 형제	Lee Myung-seok's colleague	Editor-in-chief of the publishing company	
2025	Resident Playbook	언젠가는 슬기로울 전공의생활	Kong Gi-seon		
2025	Heroes Next Door	UDT: 우리 동네 특공대	Hwang Mi-kyung		

== Stage ==
=== Musical ===
List of musical(s)
Year	Title		Role	Theater	Date	Ref.
Year	English	Korean	Role	Theater	Date	Ref.
2012–2013	Rude Miss Young-ae	막돼먹은 영애씨	Sa-jang (Young-ae's best friend)	KT&G Sangsang Madang Daechi Art Hall	11.20 – 01.13	
2013	Rude Miss Young-ae	막돼먹은 영애씨	Sa-jang (Young-ae's best friend)	Seosan Cultural Center Grand Performance Hall	03.28–29	
2013	Rude Miss Young-ae	막돼먹은 영애씨	Sa-jang (Young-ae's best friend)	CGV Shinhan Card Art Hall (formerly CGV Pop Art Hall)	06.06 – 07.14	
2014	Two Weddings and a Funeral	두결한장두 번의 결혼식과 한 번의 장례식	Hyo-jin	Yes 24 Stage 2 (DCF Daemyung Cultural Factory Building 2 Life Hall)	09.27 – 11.30	

=== Theater ===
List of stage play(s)
Year	Title		Role	Theater	Date	Ref.
Year	English	Korean	Role	Theater	Date	Ref.
2007	Sea Fog (Haemoo)	해무	Hong-mae	Yeonwoo Small Theater	06.05–22	
2007	Sea Fog (Haemoo)	해무	Hong-mae	Yeonwoo Small Theater	10.12 – 11.04	
2008	They Dream	그들, 꿈을 그리다	Gertrude	Samseong-dong Insan Art Hall (formerly Robin Art Hall)	03.16 – 04.08	
2008	Loving You	러빙유	Louise Hamilton	Happy Theater	Jul 11 – Aug 31	
2009	Sea Fog (Haemoo)	해무	Hong-mae	Seoul Art Center Jiyu Small Theater	05.23–31	
2009	Gil Sambong	길삼봉뎐	Maehyang	Namsan Arts Center	10.27–31	
2009–2010	Dramatic Night	극적인 하룻밤	Shi-hoo	Yeonwoo Small Theater	12.16 – 01.17	
2010	Rooftop House Cat	옥탑방 고양이 - 틴틴홀	Nam Jeong-eun	Tintin Hall Daehakro	04.06 – 5.30	
2010	If I Am With You	너와 함께라면	Koisho Fujimi	COEX Art Hall	04.22 – 01.01	
2010	Dramatic Night	극적인 하룻밤	Shi-hoo	Yeonwoo Small Theater	12.08 – 02.27	
2011	Dramatic Night	극적인 하룻밤	Shi-hoo	Art One Theater Hall 2	07.16 – 05.28	
2011	If I Am With You	너와 함께라면	Koisho Fujimi	Gyeonggi Arts Center Small Theater Suwon	10.22–23	
2011	Sea Fog (Haemoo)	해무	Hong-mae	Daehak-ro Art Theater Grand Theater	11.04–20	
2013	Me and Grandfather	나와 할아버지 - 고양	Grandmother	Daehak-ro Information Theater	07.11 – 08.04	
2013	Age of Love	두결한장	Haru	Daehak-ro Jayu Theater	10.05 – 12.29	
2013	Almost Maine	올모스트 메인	Hope	JTN Art Hall 4	11.11 – 01.19	
2014	Me and Grandfather	나와 할아버지 - 고양	Grandmother	Art One Theater Hall 3	Feb 2 – April 20	
2014	Fight of Cocks	수탉들의 싸움_COCK	W	Doosan Art Center Space111	Jul 11 – Aug 3	
2015	Metamorphoses	변신이야기	Female	Daehak-ro Jayu Theater	04.28 – 05.17	
2015	Metamorphoses	변신이야기	Female	Ansan Arts Center Dalmaji Theater	06.19–20	
2015	Me and Grandfather	나와 할아버지 - 고양	Grandmother	Busan KKN Theater	09.10–20	
2016	Gloria	글로리아	Kendra Jenna	Doosan Art Center Space111	Jul 26 – Aug 28	
2016–2017	Theatrical Heated Battle 6 — Toc Toc	연극열전6 - 톡톡	Lily	Daehak-ro T.O.M. Hall 2	Oct 27 – Jan 30	
2016–2017	The Helmets	더 헬멧	Helmet Soldier B	Art One Theater Hall 3	Dec 19 – Mar 4	
2017	Fight of Cocks	수탉들의 싸움_COCK	W	Art One Theater Hall 3	Mar 10 – Apr 9	
2017	Gloria	글로리아	Kendra Jenna	Art One Theater Hall 3	Jul 14 – Aug 13	
2018	The Capone Trilogy	카포네 트릴로지	Lady	Hongik University Daehangno Art Center Small Theater	Mar 20 – Jun 17	
2018	Theatrical Heated Battle 7 — The 100-year-old man who jumped out of the window and ran away	연극열전7 - 창문 넘어 도망친 100세 노인연극열전	Alan	Daehak-ro Jayu Theater	Jun 12 – Sep 2	
2018	Of Mice and Men	생쥐와 인간	Mrs. Curley	Daehak-ro T.O.M. Hall 2	Jul 24 – Oct 14	
2019	The Pride	프라이드	Sylvia	Art One Theater Hall 2	May 25 – Aug 25	
2020	Wife	와이프	Daisy	Sejong Center of Performing Art S Theater	Jul 30 – Aug 2	
2020	Wife	와이프	Daisy	Art One Theater Hall 2	July 8 – Sep 18	
2020	Wife	와이프	Daisy	Daehak-ro Art Theater Grand Theater	Aug 8–20	
2021	Dressing Room	분장실	C	Daehakro Jayu Theater	Aug 7 – Sep 12	
2022	Theatrical Battle 9 - Touching The Void	연극열전9_3rd — 터칭 더 보이드	Sara	Art One Theater Hall 2	July 8 – Sep 18	
2022–2023	Orphans	오펀스	Treat	Art One Theatre 1	Nov 29 – Feb 26	

== Awards and nominations ==
Award(s) and Nomination(s) received by Son Ji-yoon
Award ceremony		Year	Category	Work	Result	Ref.
13th	Interpark Golden Ticket Awards (Note: The Golden Ticket Awards (골든티켓어워즈) is an awards ceremony that selects works and people who have shown the best ticket power by performance genre during the year. Since 2005, Interpark has held an awards ceremony by adding up ticket sales, ranking scores, and online voting for each year at the end of the year.)	2017	Best Actress in a Play	The Helmet	Nominated	
15th	Interpark Golden Ticket Awards	2019	Best Actress in a Play	Capone Trilogy	Nominated	
17th	Interpark Golden Ticket Awards	2023	Best Actress in a Play	Touching The Void, Orphan	Nominated	
Stage Talk Audience's Choice Awards (SACA) (Note: StageTalk Audience's Choice Awards (SACA) is theater and musical award festival that decides the winner based on pure votes from fans of the performance.)		2016	Best Actress Theater	Gloria, Tok Tok	Nominated	
Stage Talk Audience's Choice Awards (SACA)		2018	Best Supporting Actress Theater	The Helmet	Nominated	
Stage Talk Audience's Choice Awards (SACA)		2019	Best Supporting Actress Theater	The Pride	Won	
2023 SBS Drama Awards		2023	Best Supporting Actress in a Miniseries Genre/Fantasy Drama	The First Responders	Won	
