= Touching the Void =

Touching the Void may refer to:

- Touching the Void (book), a 1988 book by Joe Simpson
  - Touching the Void (film), a 2003 film based on the book
  - Touching the Void (play), a 2018 play based on the book
