= Kevin Macdonald (director) =

British film director (born 1967)

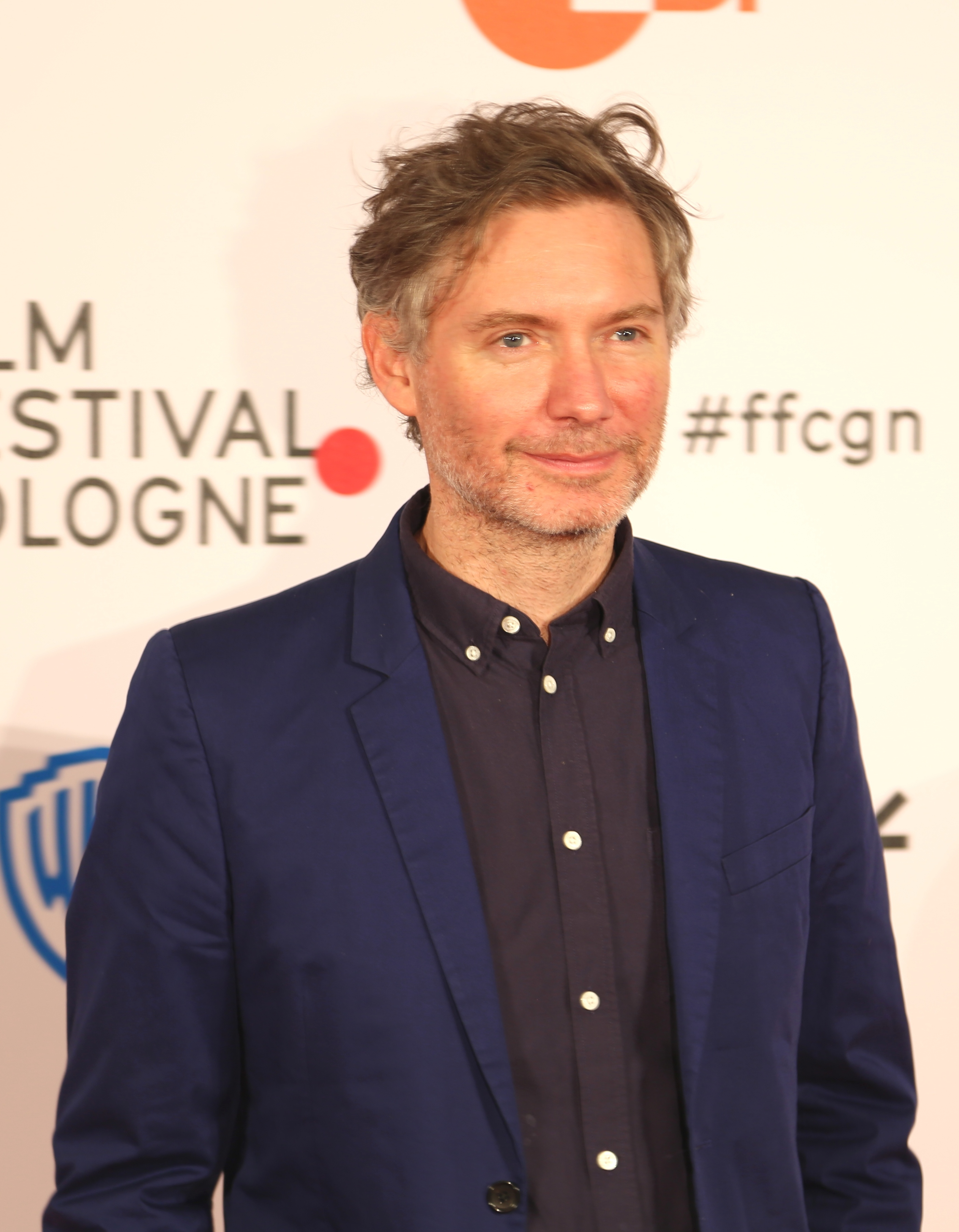
- Macdonald at the Film Festival Cologne 2017
- Born: Kevin Glyn Buchanan Macdonald; 28 October 1967 (age 59); Glasgow, Scotland
- Occupations: Film director, producer, screenwriter
- Years active: 1994–present
- Spouse: Tatiana Lund (m. 1999)
- Children: 3
- Relatives: Andrew Macdonald (brother); Emeric Pressburger (grandfather)

Kevin Macdonald (born 28 October 1967) is a Scottish film director. His films include One Day in September (1999), a documentary about the 1972 murder of 11 Israeli athletes, which won him the Academy Award for Best Documentary Feature, the climbing documentary Touching the Void (2003), the drama The Last King of Scotland (2006), the political thriller State of Play (2009), the Bob Marley documentary Marley (2012), the post-apocalyptic drama How I Live Now (2013), the thriller Black Sea (2014), the Whitney Houston documentary Whitney (2018), and the legal drama film The Mauritanian (2021).

== Early life ==
Macdonald was born in Glasgow, Scotland. His maternal grandparents were the Hungarian-born British Jewish filmmaker Emeric Pressburger and English screenwriter and actress Wendy Orme. He was brought up in Gartocharn, Dunbartonshire and attended the local primary school for the first five years of his education, He was educated at Glenalmond College, and St Anne's College, Oxford. His brother Andrew Macdonald is a film producer.

== Career ==
Macdonald began his career with a biography of his grandfather, The Life and Death of a Screenwriter (1994), which he turned into the documentary The Making of an Englishman (1995).

After making a series of biographical documentaries, Macdonald directed One Day in September (1999), about the murder of Israeli athletes at the 1972 Munich Olympics. Possibly the most striking feature of this film was the lengthy interview with Jamal Al-Gashey, the last known survivor among the Munich terrorists (it has been suggested recently in Aaron Klein's book Striking Back that another, Mohammed Safady, might also still be alive). Macdonald found Al-Gashey through intermediaries, and was able to convince him that the film would only be truly authentic if Al-Gashey gave his side of the story. Convinced that Israeli authorities were still hunting him (he had been in hiding ever since being ransomed for a hijacked aeroplane less than two months after the Munich massacre), Al-Gashey agreed to the interview only on the condition that he would be disguised, his face would be shown only in shadow or blurred out, and that the interview would be conducted by a person and in a place of Al-Gashey's choosing (which turned out to be Amman, Jordan), although Al-Gashey agreed that Macdonald could be present. Since the interview was conducted entirely in Arabic (even though Al-Gashey was known to be fluent in English, having been interviewed in the language in 1972), and Al-Gashey (through paranoia or annoyance) frequently stormed out of the interview room, Macdonald did not know if he had anything usable until he returned to London and hired an Arabic translator. The film won an Oscar for Best Documentary.

His next film was Touching the Void, a documentary about two British climbers, Joe Simpson and Simon Yates, who in 1985 made the first successful, albeit near-fatal, ascent of the West Face of the mountain Siula Grande, a major peak in the Andes in Peru. The film won the Alexander Korda Award for Best British Film at the 57th British Academy Film Awards – coincidentally, it was Korda who had given Macdonald's grandfather his first job when he had arrived in Britain in 1935.

In 2006, Macdonald made his feature film debut with The Last King of Scotland, a fictionalized drama depicting the dictatorship of Ugandan President Idi Amin, adapted from the 1998 novel of the same name. Forest Whitaker received widespread acclaim for his performance in the film and won multiple acting awards including that year's Academy Award for Best Actor.

He has also directed a number of television commercials with RSA Films who represent him for all his TV commercial work worldwide.

Macdonald directed the 2009 film adaptation of the BBC television drama State of Play, starring Russell Crowe. He then directed The Eagle (2011), an adaptation of Rosemary Sutcliff's adventure novel The Eagle of the Ninth, about a young Roman officer attempting to recover the lost Roman eagle standard of his father's legion in Caledonia. Bobby Fischer Goes to War, his next project, is a film about the 1972 World Chess Championship in Reykjavík, Iceland, in which Bobby Fischer took on the entire Soviet chess establishment.

Macdonald directed Life in a Day, produced by Ridley Scott, a documentary created from crowd-sourced footage filmed by thousands of people from around the world about their life on the same day, 24 July 2010, and posted on YouTube. The film premiered at the 2011 Sundance Film Festival and simultaneously streamed live on YouTube.

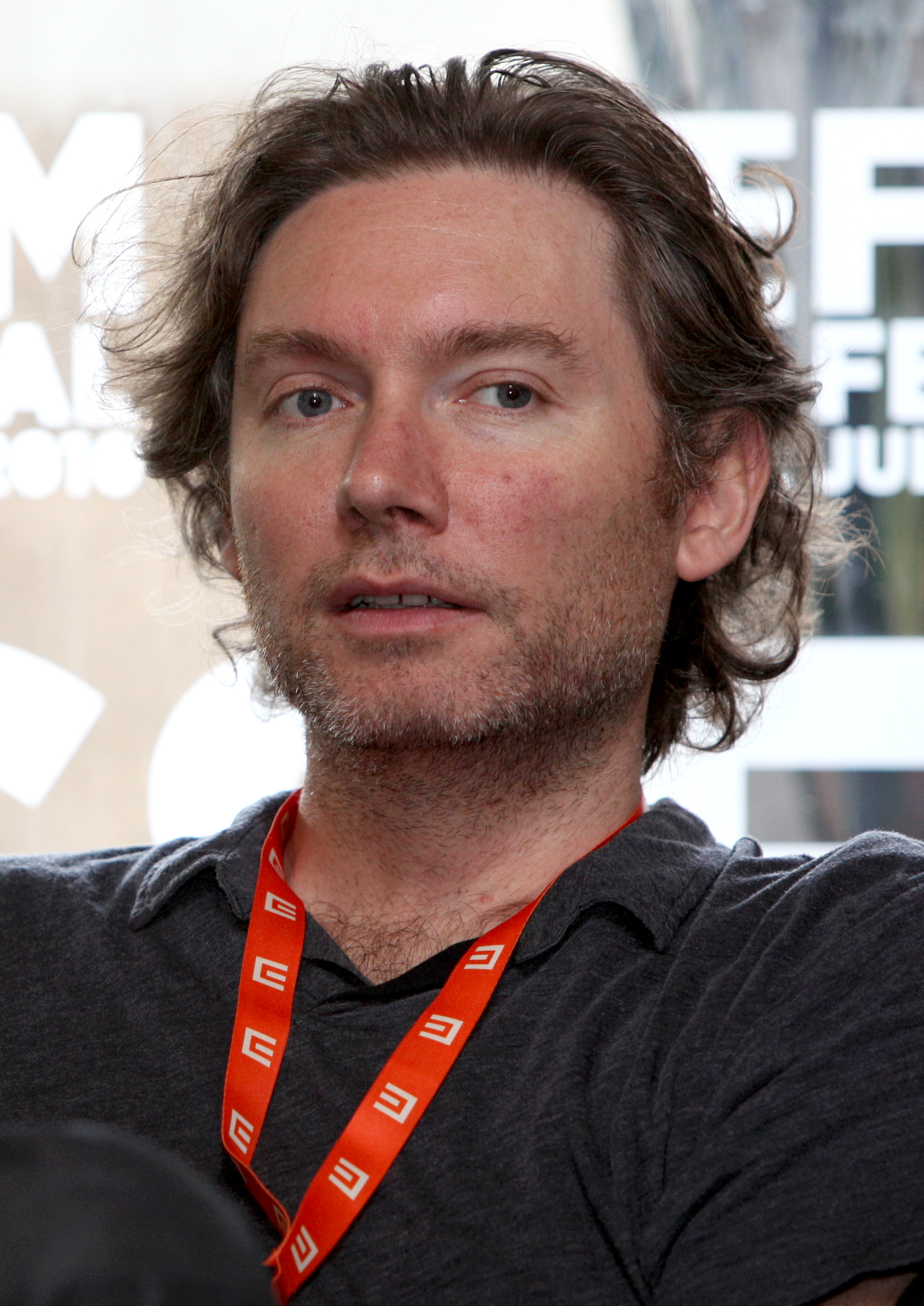
Macdonald in 2010

In 2018 Macdonald directed Whitney, a documentary about the life and death of Whitney Houston. It was the first documentary about Houston to be officially authorised by her estate, and included never-before-seen footage and interviews with her friends, family, and collaborators, like Clive Davis. Macdonald stated, "The story that is never told about Whitney is just how brilliant she was as an artist; by many measures she had the greatest voice of the last 50 years. She changed the way pop music was sung – bringing it back full circle to its blues and gospel roots. She was also completely unique in being a black pop star who transcended her race globally with her work sold in countries where black artists don't sell." The film won Best Documentary Feature at the 2018 Edinburgh International Film Festival.

In 2021, Macdonald directed The Mauritanian, a legal drama starring Tahar Rahim and Jodie Foster, based on the true story of Mohamedou Ould Slahi, a Mauritanian man who was held for fourteen years (2002 to 2016) without charge at Guantanamo Bay, a United States military prison. The film received mixed to positive reviews, with critics praising the direction, cinematography, and performances of the cast, but criticising its screenplay. At the 78th Golden Globe Awards the film received two nominations in the film category: Best Actor for Rahim, and Best Supporting Actress, which was won by Foster. At the 74th British Academy Film Awards the film received five nominations, including nomination for Best Film.

His project George Blake, produced by Femke Wolting, which will focus on the story of George Blake, a Dutch-born MI6 agent turned Soviet spy, won the "Seriesmakers" development prize at the 2024 Series Mania festival.

Macdonald directed the 2026 action thriller film The Runner, starring Gal Gadot. The film was released on Amazon Prime Video to overwhelmingly negative reviews.

== Personal life ==
In 1999, he married Tatiana Lund, with whom he has three sons. He lives in North London. After Brexit, Macdonald obtained Hungarian citizenship through his relation to his maternal grandfather.

== Filmography ==
=== Documentary works ===
Film

Year	Title	Director	Producer	Writer	Notes
1996	Chaplin's Goliath	Yes	No	Yes	
1997	The Moving World of George Rickey	Yes	No	No	
1998	Donald Cammell: The Ultimate Performance	Yes	Yes	No	Co-directed with Chris Rodley
1999	One Day in September	Yes	No	No	
2000	A Brief History of Errol Morris	Yes	No	No	
2003	Touching the Void	Yes	No	No	
2007	My Enemy's Enemy	Yes	Yes	Yes	
2011	Life in a Day	Yes	No	No	
2012	Marley	Yes	No	No	
2013	Christmas in a Day	Yes	No	No	Co-directed with Ilona Kacieja
2016	Sky Ladder: The Art of Cai Guo-Qiang	Yes	No	No	
2018	Whitney	Yes	No	Yes	
2018	Return to Podor	Yes	No	No	
2021	Life in a Day 2020	Yes	Yes	No	
2023	High & Low – John Galliano	Yes	Yes	No	
2024	Klitschko: More Than a Fight	Yes	Executive	No	Co-directed with Edgar Dubrovskiy
2024	One to One: John & Yoko	Yes	Yes	No	Co-directed with Sam Rice-Edwards

Short film

Year	Title	Director	Executive Producer	Notes
1998	Kindertransport	Yes	Yes	Co-directed with Fran Robertson
2023	Last Song from Kabul	Yes	No	Co-directed with Ruhi Hamid

Direct-to-video

- Touching the Void: Return to Siula Grande (2004)
- Shallow Grave: Digging Your Own Grave (2009)

TV movies

Year	Title	Notes
1995	The Making of an Englishman	Also writer
1997	Howard Hawks: American Artist	
2000	Humphrey Jennings: The Man Who Listened to Britain	
2001	Being Mick	Also cinematographer
2021	2020: The Story of Us	
2021	It Takes a Flood...	Co-directed with David Charap

=== Narrative works ===
Film

Year	Title	Notes
2006	The Last King of Scotland	
2009	State of Play	
2011	The Eagle	
2013	How I Live Now	
2014	Black Sea	Also producer
2021	The Mauritanian	
2026	The Runner	

Television

Year	Title	Director	Executive Producer	Notes
2016	11.22.63	Yes	Yes	Episode "The Rabbit Hole"
2017	Oasis	Yes	Yes	TV movie

== Bibliography ==
- Emeric Pressburger: The Life and Death of a Screenwriter by Kevin Macdonald. London: Faber and Faber, 1994. ISBN (Paperback ISBN 0-571-17829-4).
- Imagining Reality: The Faber Book of the Documentary by Kevin Macdonald and Mark Cousins. London: Faber and Faber, 1996. ISBN 0-571-17723-9.
- Imagining Reality: The Faber Book of the Documentary: Second Edition by Kevin Macdonald and Mark Cousins. London: Faber and Faber, 1996. ISBN 0-571-22514-4.
- Aitken, Ian (2006). Encyclopedia of the Documentary Film. Vol. 2. Routledge. ISBN 978-0-415-97638-1.
