= Simon Yates =

Simon Yates is the name of:

- Simon Yates (mountaineer) (born 1963), English mountaineer
- Simon Yates (golfer) (born 1970), Scottish golfer
- Simon Yates (cyclist) (born 1992), English cyclist
