= Touching the Void (book) =

1988 book by Joe Simpson

- First edition
- Author: Joe Simpson
- Language: English
- Genre: Non-fiction
- Publisher: Jonathan Cape
- Publication date: 1988

Touching the Void is a 1988 book by Joe Simpson, recounting his and Simon Yates's near fatal descent after climbing the 6,344-metre (20,814 ft) peak Siula Grande in the Peruvian Andes. It has sold over a million copies and has been translated into over 20 languages.

== Summary ==
In 1985, Simpson and Yates reached the peak of Siula Grande, a major mountain in the Cordillera Huayhuash in the Peruvian Andes via the previously unclimbed West Face. They began descending via the peak's North Ridge which the pair found unexpectedly challenging with Yates falling through a cornice down the face they had just climbed but he was held by the rope which prevented him falling 4,500 ft (1,400 m) to his death. Because the difficult terrain and the poor weather conditions prevented rapid progress with the descent, the pair had to spend a night in a snow hole on the ridge. During the night they had eaten the last of their food and used the last of fuel for their stove to melt ice and snow for drinking water. Continuing the descent the following morning Simpson fell from an ice cliff and landed awkwardly, breaking his right leg and crushing his tibia into his knee joint. With bad weather closing in and daylight fading, they needed to descend quickly to the glacier, about 3,000 feet (900 m) below.

Yates proceeded to lower Simpson off the North Ridge using their two 150-foot (46 m) ropes tied together to make one 300-foot (91 m) rope, controlling the speed at which he lowered Simpson using a belay plate. This methodology meant that each lower had to proceed in three stages: two to descend each rope length, and one to negotiate the join between them. The steep open snow and ice slope to be descended did not have any belay points or other anchors from which Yates could secure himself to lower his companion so they created a stance by excavating a shallow cavity/seat where Yates could brace himself to take the strain of Simpson's weight on the rope and control the descent. Simpson was lowered 150 feet until the knot in the rope came up against the belay plate, at which point he had to take his weight off the rope by standing on his uninjured leg. This gave Yates enough slack to unclip the rope and rethread it back through the lowering device with the knot on the other side, following which he lowered Simpson a further 150 feet. Then when Simpson had made himself secure, Yates would downclimb to Simpson's position and the pair then created another stance from which the procedure could be repeated. The system worked; Yates lowered Simpson approximately 3,000 feet (910 m) by this method and the pair felt they were regaining control of the situation estimating that they had almost descended to the relative safety of the glacier. With storm conditions worsening and darkness upon them, Yates continued lowering Simpson for what he estimated would be the last or penultimate time. The slope that Simpson was being lowered down became gradually steeper and eventually he went over the edge of a cliff and was hanging free with his whole weight on the rope. Because Yates was sitting higher up the mountain, he could not see nor hear Simpson to fully assess the situation; he could only feel that Simpson had all his weight on the rope. Simpson attempted to ascend the rope using Prusik loops. However, because his hands were badly frostbitten, he struggled to tie the knots properly and accidentally dropped one of the two loops required to ascend the rope.

The pair were both in mortal danger. Simpson could not climb up the rope, Yates could not pull him back up, they could not communicate and, although they could not know this, the cliff was too high for Simpson to be lowered down. They remained in this position for some time (Yates estimates in excess of one and a half hours), until it was obvious to Yates that his unbelayed stance, merely a seat dug into the near vertical snow slope without any fixed anchors, was gradually collapsing as he began to be pulled downwards in 'small jerky steps'. Yates knew he was about to be pulled from the cliff and that he would fall the 150 ft he was above Simpson plus some unknown additional distance to the glacier below and concluded he needed to cut the rope in order to prevent a fall that would almost certainly kill him. Yates cut the rope not knowing how far Simpson was from the base of the cliff; Simpson plummeted down the cliff and into a deep crevasse. Exhausted and suffering from hypothermia and frostbite, Yates dug himself a snow cave to wait out the storm. The next morning in clear weather, Yates carried on descending the mountain by himself. When he reached the glacier he could see from below the position in which Simpson had been hanging and observed the large crevasse immediately underneath. Yates realized the situation that Simpson had been in and that he must have fallen into the crevasse when the rope was cut. He then approached the edge of the crevasse calling out to Simpson by name and, hearing no reply, Yates concluded that Simpson had been killed by the fall into the crevasse and so continued down the mountain alone.

Simpson, however, was still alive. He had survived the fall of more than 200 feet (61 meters) and had landed on a small ledge inside the crevasse. When he regained consciousness, he discovered that the rope had been cut and concluded that Yates had probably survived but would presume that he was dead. He therefore had to save himself but he found it impossible to climb up to the entrance of the crevasse, because of the overhanging ice and his broken leg. Therefore, his only choice was to abseil deeper into the crevasse and hope that there was another way out. After lowering himself, Simpson found himself on a snow bridge which he crossed to get on to a steep snow slope which he climbed to get back onto the glacier.

In a fortunate coincidence, although Yates had no choice as to where in the rope's 300-foot (91 m) length he made the cut (it happened to be in the middle) it left each climber a sufficient length of rope to extricate themselves from their overnight positions. Yates had enough rope to abseil to safety from his snow hole and Simpson had enough rope to get to a point in the crevasse where he could climb out.

From there, Simpson spent three days without food and with almost no water, crawling and hopping five miles (8 km) back to their base camp. This involved navigating the glacier (which was scattered with more crevasses) and the moraines below. Exhausted and delirious, he reached base camp only a few hours before Yates and Richard Hawking (the third member of the group, a non-climber) intended to leave the base camp and return to civilization.

Simpson's survival is regarded by mountaineers as amongst the most remarkable instances of survival against the odds.

== Awards ==
The book won the 1989 Boardman Tasker Prize for Mountain Literature and the 1989 NCR Book Award.

== Adaptations ==
In 2003, fifteen years after it was first published, the book was turned into a documentary film of the same name, directed by Kevin MacDonald. The film won the Alexander Korda Award for Best British Film at the 2003 BAFTA Awards and was featured at the 2004 Sundance Film Festival. In 2014, the book was being used in the English literature AQA GCSE course nationally in England.

A stage adaptation by David Greig premiered at the Bristol Old Vic in September 2018. The production toured for a year before running at the Duke of York's Theatre in London's West End from November 2019 until February 2020.
