= Touching the Void (film) =

2003 British film by Kevin Macdonald

- Region 2 DVD cover
- Directed by: Kevin Macdonald
- Produced by: John Smithson
- Starring: Brendan Mackey; Nicholas Aaron; Ollie Ryall
- Cinematography: Mike Eley
- Edited by: Justine Wright
- Music by: Alex Heffes
- Production companies: FilmFour; UK Film Council; Channel 4 PBS; Darlow Smithson Productions
- Distributed by: IFC Films (United States); FilmFour Distributors; Pathé Distribution (United Kingdom)
- Release dates: 5 September 2003 (TIFF); 12 December 2003
- Running time: 106 minutes
- Countries: United Kingdom; United States
- Language: English
- Budget: £2 million
- Box office: $13.8 million

Touching the Void is a 2003 survival documentary film directed by Kevin Macdonald and starring Brendan Mackey, Nicholas Aaron, and Ollie Ryall. The plot concerns Joe Simpson and Simon Yates' near-fatal descent after making the first successful ascent of the West Face of Siula Grande in the Cordillera Huayhuash in the Peruvian Andes, in 1985. It is based on Simpson's 1988 book of the same name.

Critically acclaimed, Touching the Void was listed in PBS's "100 Greatest Documentaries of All Time". The Guardian described it as "the most successful documentary in British cinema history".

== Summary ==
In 1985, Joe Simpson and Simon Yates, both experienced mountaineers, successfully ascended the previously unclimbed West Face of Siula Grande in Peru. After leaving the summit their descent by way of the North Ridge proves unexpectedly difficult in, at times, stormy weather conditions. Shortly after the pair leave the summit, Yates falls through a cornice and plummets down the 4,500 ft (1,400 m) face they had just climbed, but his fall is arrested by their climbing ropes. After a bivouac high on the peak, the pair continue their descent the following morning, but then Simpson falls whilst climbing down an ice cliff on the ridge and suffers a badly broken leg during an awkward landing. The pair commence a self-rescue with Yates lowering Simpson with ropes down a steep, 3,000 ft (910 m), snow and ice slope while the weather deteriorates into a fierce storm. The total length of rope the pair have is 300 ft (91 m), so the lowering process has to be undertaken in a series of repeat manoeuvres. The pair had almost reached the relative safety of the glacier when Yates inadvertently lowers Simpson over the edge of a large cliff, leaving him suspended on the rope in mid-air. Yates arrests his partner's fall, but cannot see the predicament he is in, nor hear him over the howling wind.

Unable to pull Simpson back up the cliff and gradually losing traction in the loose snow, Yates realizes, after about an hour and a half, that he is gradually being pulled from his unbelayed stance and will eventually fall in excess of 150 feet to his almost certain death. Yates decides that the only option available to him to avoid being pulled from the cliff is to cut the rope connecting him with Simpson. After surviving a sub-zero and stormy night on the mountain, Yates completed his descent to the surface of the glacier, but cannot find his partner, and concludes that Simpson must have fallen to the large crevasse at the base of the cliff. He inspects the opening of the crevasse the best he can without falling in himself and calls out to try and communicate with Simpson. Receiving no response, Yates concludes Simpson must be dead. He returns to the base camp alone, where he stays to recuperate from his ordeal.

Simpson, however, survived the fall and is now trapped in the large crevasse. He manages to lower himself further into the dark abyss and finds an exit leading to the surface of the glacier. He then spends three days crawling and hopping back to base camp across the glacier and moraines, despite his broken leg, frostbite, and severe dehydration. Exhausted and delirious, Simpson reaches camp only a few hours before Yates and Richard Hawking (a non-climber who was the third member of the expedition) intend to leave and return to civilization.

The main docudrama ends when Simpson reaches base camp to find Yates and Hawking still in residence and his safety is then assured. The DVD contains two additional documentary features. What Happened Next documents what happened after Simpson reached base camp and how he was evacuated to a hospital in Lima by his two companions and his subsequent return to England. Return to Siula Grande documents the making of the film in 2002 and the thoughts and reactions of Simpson, Yates, and Hawking when they return to the scene of their epic adventure.

== Production ==
The film stars Brendan Mackey as Joe Simpson, Nicholas Aaron as Simon Yates, and Ollie Ryall as Richard Hawking, and combines dramatizations together with interviews with Simpson, Yates, and Hawking. Simpson and Yates doubled as their younger selves for long-distance shots of the snow-fluted couloirs of Siula Grande. The film was directed by Kevin Macdonald.

When they collaborated on the making of the film in 2002, Simpson and Yates had hardly seen one another for 10 years.

== Response ==
During the making of the film, the director and producers invited Yates and Simpson to return to Siula Grande in 2002 for the first time since the events of 1985. Simpson, despite finding the return emotionally difficult and experiencing post-traumatic stress syndrome on his return, eventually said that he was happy with the film and its portrayal of the events. Yates, on the other hand, reported having no unresolved issues relating to his and Simpson's adventure in 1985 nor to returning to Siula Grande to make the film, and decided to have nothing further to do with the production of the film once he had returned to England.

According to the film's end notes, Yates received criticism from some members of the mountaineering community in Britain for cutting the rope on his partner during the descent. However, according to interviews with Yates, the climbing community (including Simpson) has largely always sided with him on that matter, and he accused the film of being selectively edited and one-sided. Simpson has stated that his initial motivation in commencing the writing of the book was to set out the facts of the adventure in response to what he saw as unfair criticism of Yates.

The film received largely positive reviews. On the review aggregator website Rotten Tomatoes, 93% of 135 critics' reviews are positive, with an average rating of 7.30/10. The website's consensus reads: "Gripping even though the outcome is known." Metacritic, which uses a weighted average, assigned the film a score of 82 out of 100, based on 34 critics, indicating "universal acclaim".

=== Awards ===
Touching the Void won Alexander Korda Award for Best British Film at the 57th British Academy Film Awards.

Peter Knegt at Indiewire called it one of the "10 incredible documentaries that weren't nominated for an Oscar".

The BBC1's Film 2011 included Brendan Mackey's performance as Joe Simpson in their "Top Five Actors" who "Should Have Won an Oscar", along with Ingrid Bergman (for Casablanca), Anthony Perkins (for Psycho), Ralph Fiennes (for Schindler's List) and Jeff Bridges (for The Big Lebowski).

== Box office ==
The film was released in theaters on 23 January 2004 and grossed $96,973 in the opening weekend. It went on to gross $4,593,598 in America and $9,292,204 from foreign markets for a worldwide total of $13,885,802 after 20 weeks.

== Music ==
Original music for the film was scored by Alex Heffes. The climbers reach the summit to the climax of Thomas Tallis's Spem in alium. During one of Simpson's many deliriums, he experiences a very strong reminiscence of a Boney M song he hated thoroughly, "Brown Girl in the Ring"; at one point thinking "Bloody hell, I'm going to die to Boney M".
