= Sky Ladder: The Art of Cai Guo-Qiang =

2016 documentary film

- Directed by: Kevin Macdonald
- Starring: Ian Buruma; Guo-Qiang Cai; Wen-You Cai
- Distributed by: Netflix
- Release date: October 14, 2016
- Running time: 76 minutes
- Country: United States
- Languages: English, Mandarin

Sky Ladder: The Art of Cai Guo-Qiang is a 2016 documentary film directed by Kevin Macdonald about the life and work of Cai Guo-Qiang known for his artwork with the help of gunpowder. The film was released by Netflix on October 14, 2016.

== Premise ==
The story is told both through Cai Guo-Qiang's own words, as well as family, friends and observers of his craft, spanning from the artist's childhood in Mao's China just starting out, all the way to present day highly-publicized public art performances on a global scale.

== Cast ==
- Ian Buruma
- Guo-Qiang Cai
- Wen-You Cai
- Wenhao Cai
- Ben Davis
- Jeffrey Deitch
- Phil Grucci
- Thomas Krens
- Tatsumi Masatoshi
- Orville Schell
- Jennifer Wen Ma
- Hong Hong Wu
- Yimou Zhang
