= Snow cornice =

Overhanging edge of snow

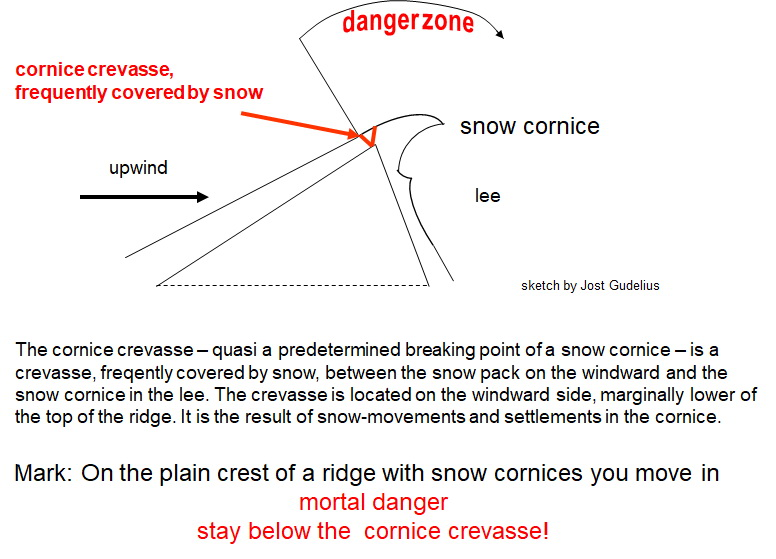
Danger zone on a cornice

A snow cornice or simply cornice (from the Italian cornice meaning "ledge") is an overhanging edge of snow on a ridge or the crest of a mountain and along the sides of gullies.

== Formation ==
A snow cornice forms by wind blowing snow over sharp terrain breaks (e.g. the crest of the mountain) where it attaches and builds out horizontally. This build-up is most common on the steeper and leeward sides of mountains. Cornices are extremely dangerous and travelling above or below them should be avoided.

When a cornice collapses, it breaks in from the cornice to the top of the peak; even being on the snow on top of rock exposes the alpinist to hazard in this situation. The best practice in mountaineering is to stay far enough back from the edge so as not to be able to see the drop, as an approximate metric of exposure.

In avalanche safety, cornices are a high avalanche danger as they often break and trigger larger avalanches that permeate several snow layers. Cornices are particularly vulnerable to collapse during periods of high solar irradiance.

== Gallery ==
Snow cornices
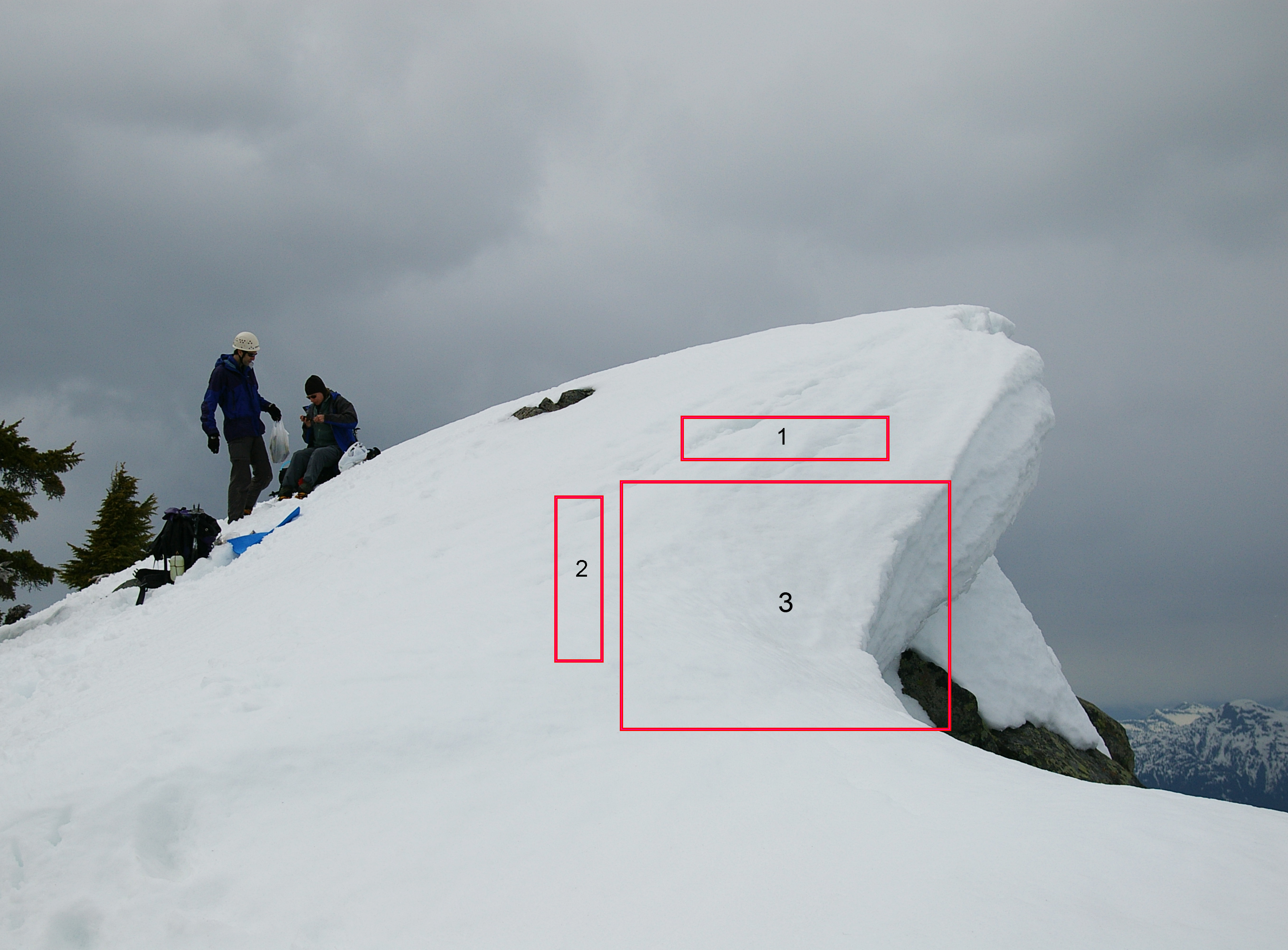
A cornice of snow about to fall. Cracks in the snow are visible in area (1). Area (3) fell soon after this picture was taken, leaving area (2) as the new edge.

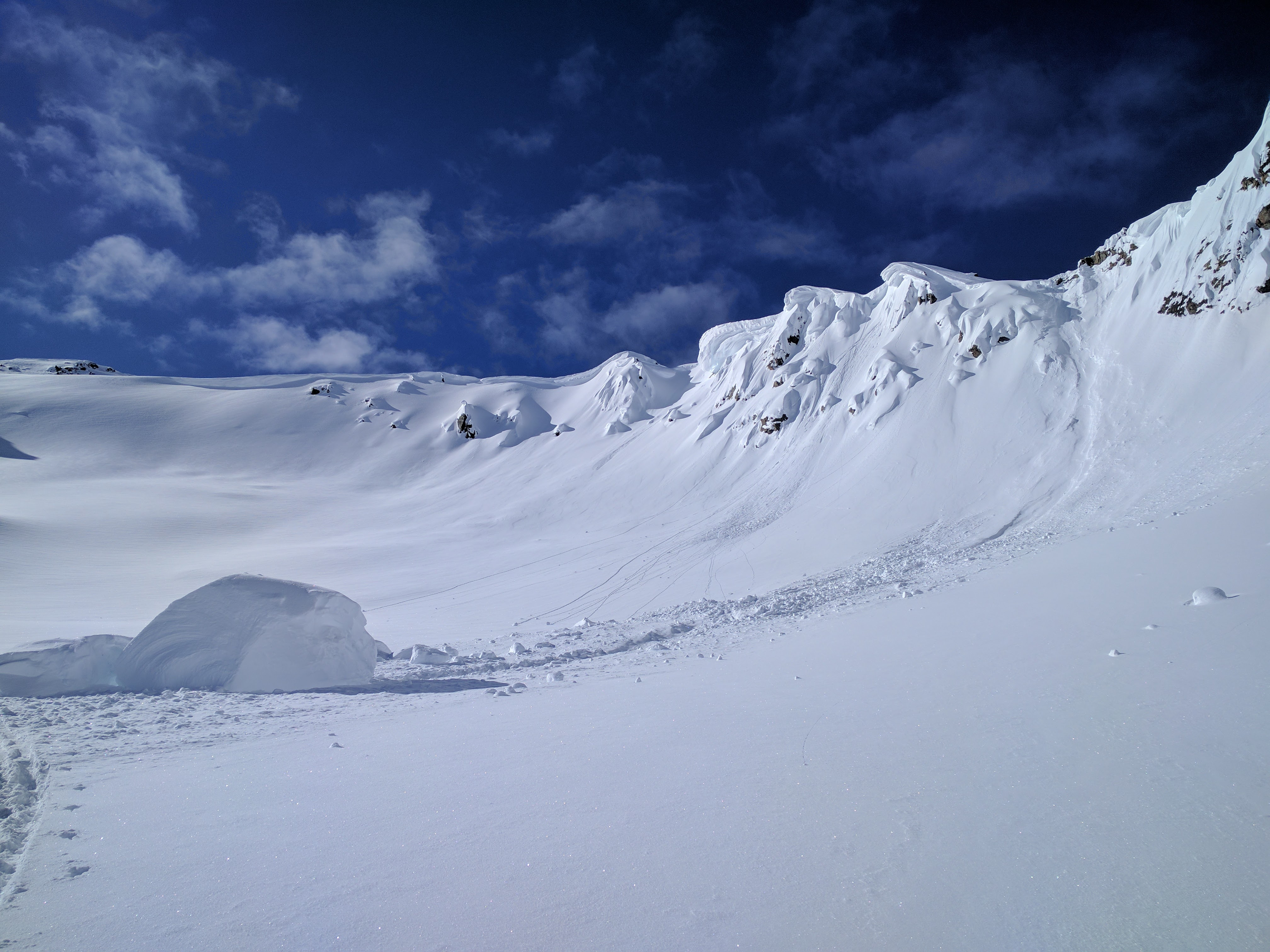
A piece of snow cornice which has fallen off a ridge in early spring

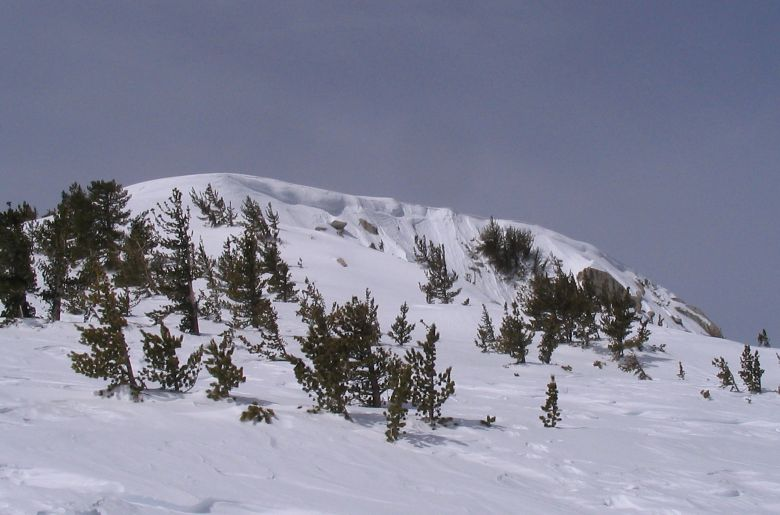
The summit of San Jacinto Peak covered by a cornice formed by wind-blown snow

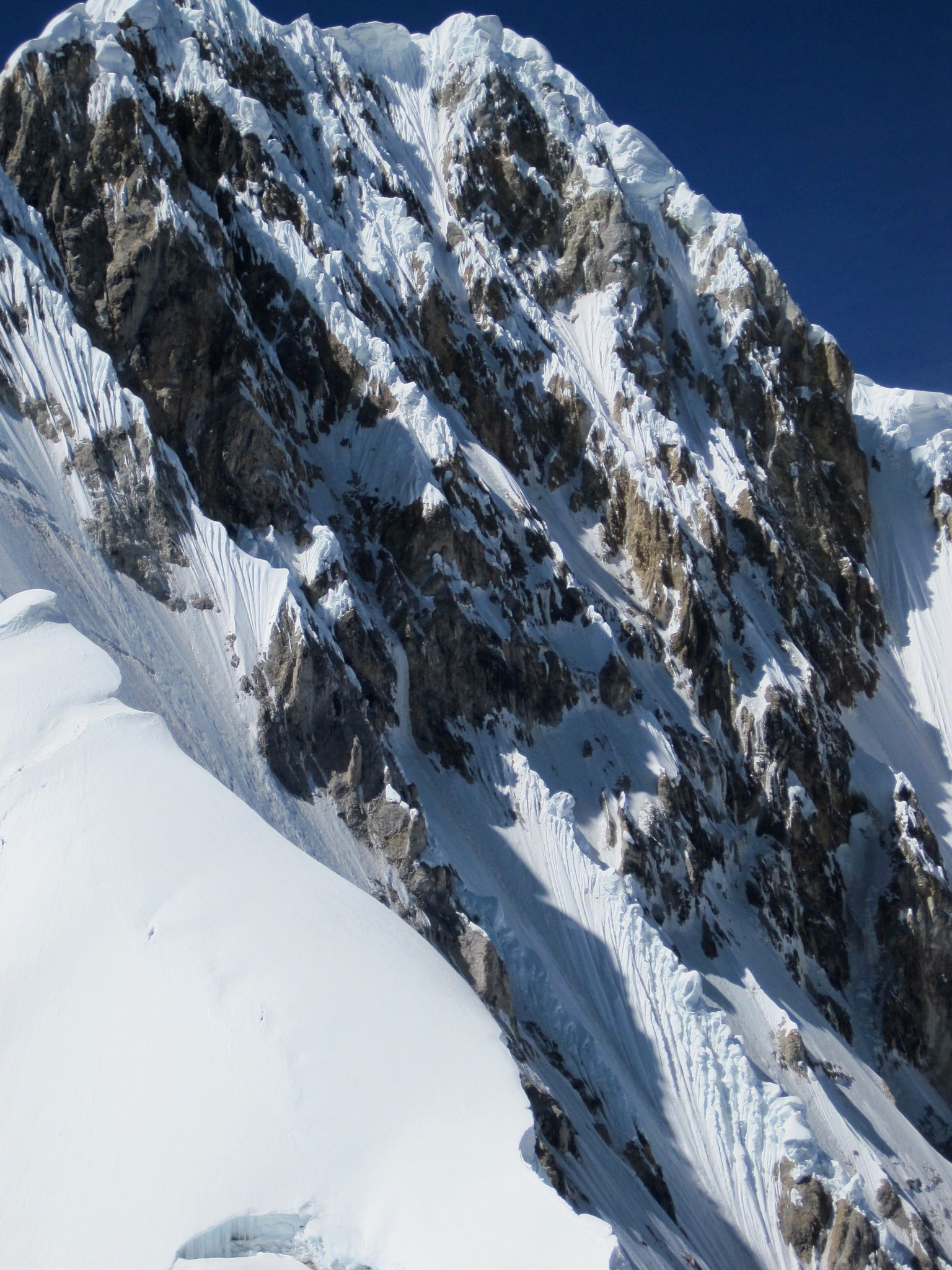
Massive snow cornices line the summit ridge of Siula Grande, and are a characteristic feature of this peak.

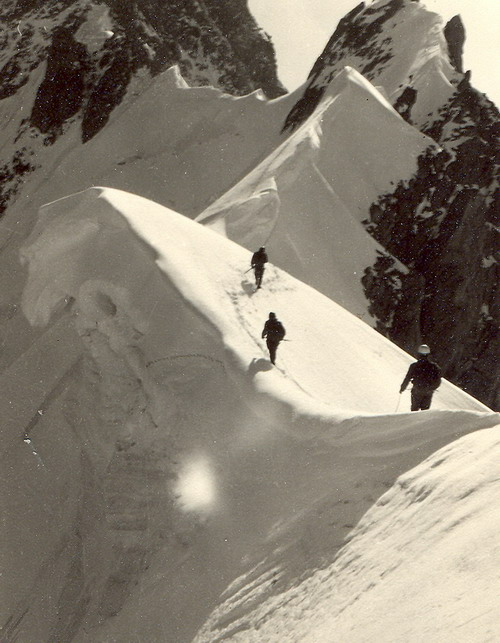
Alternating cornices on the Rochefort-Crest in the Mont Blanc area in the Alps—always overhanging above the steeper face of the crest

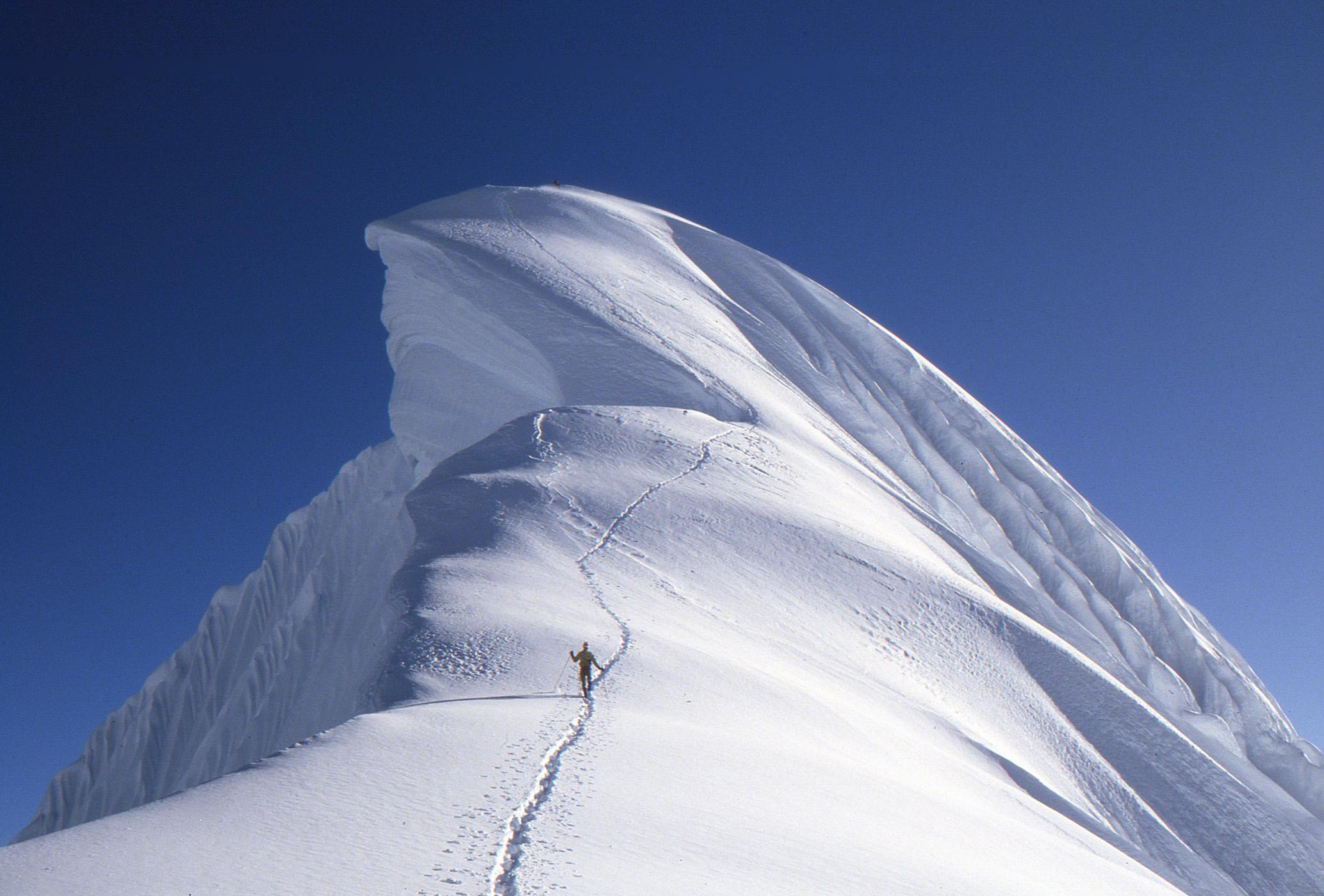
Giant cornice on top of the Chopicalqui at 6,345 m (20,817 ft) in the Andes in Peru

== See also ==
- List of climbing topics
- Sastrugi
