= Samgak-dong =

Neighbourhood in Seoul, South Korea

- Interactive map of Samgak-dong
- Country: South Korea

Korean name
- Hangul: 삼각동
- Hanja: 三角洞
- RR: Samgak-dong
- MR: Samgak-tong

Samgak-dong (Korean: 삼각동) is a legal dong (neighbourhood) of Jung District, Seoul, South Korea. It is administered by its administrative dong, Myeong-dong.

== See also ==
- Administrative divisions of South Korea
