= Siula Grande =

Mountain in the Peruvian Andes

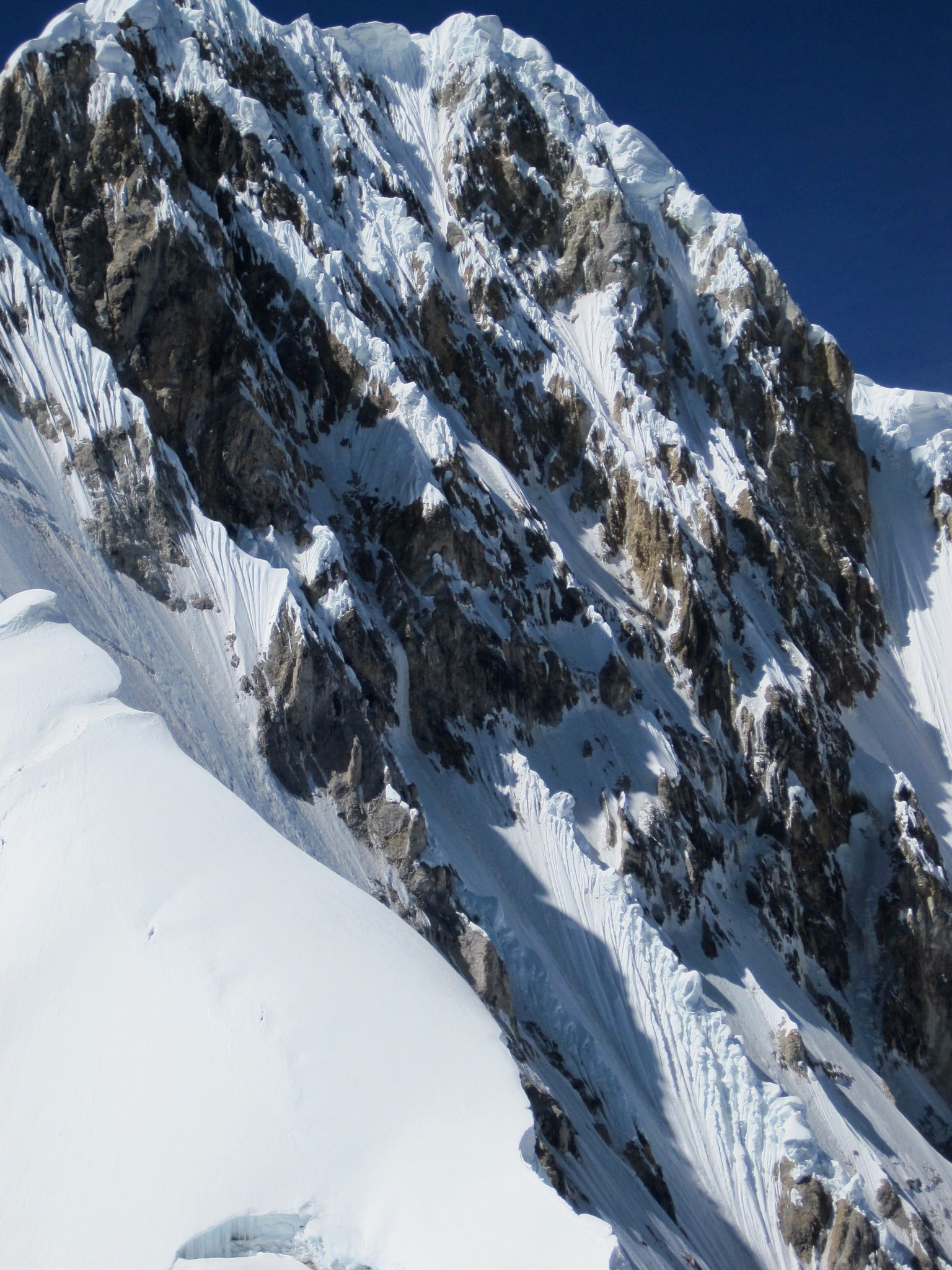
- The west face of Siula Grande taken from the col with Yerupaja.

Highest point
- Elevation: 6,344 m (20,814 ft)
- Prominence: 688 m (2,257 ft)
- Listing: Mountains in Peru
- Coordinates: 10°17′S 76°53′W

Geography
- Location within Peru
- Location: Peru
- Parent range: Andes, Huayhuash

Climbing
- First ascent: August 1, 1936
- Easiest route: glacier/snow/ice climb

Siula Grande is a mountain in the Huayhuash mountain range in the Peruvian Andes. It is 6,344 metres (20,814 ft) high and has a subpeak, Siula Chico, 6,260 m (20,540 ft) high.

== Touching the Void ascent ==
In 1985, Siula Grande was climbed by Joe Simpson and Simon Yates. Although they ascended the West face, and thereby became the first to reach the summit by that route, they chose to descend the North Ridge, the route of the first ascent and descent in 1936. This was made almost impossible by severe weather which caused Simpson to fall and severely break his leg. All subsequent west face climbers have avoided the ridge and rappelled down the face.

Simpson and Yates's ascent was described in Simpson's book Touching the Void. The book was made into a film of the same title in 2003 and a play in 2018.

== First ascents list ==
This is a partial list of first ascents by new routes made.

- 28 July 1936 North Ridge by Arnold Awerzger and Erwin Schneider from Austria.
- 21 June 1966 fourth ascent, by Obster, Schulz and Manfred Sturm via the North ridge en route to Siula Chico
- 1983 West Face to North ridge, after retreating from the direct West face due to rockfall hazard. 2 bivies. David Fish Fulton and Scott Flavelle
- 1985 West Face by Joe Simpson and Simon Yates
- 16 June 1999 Avoiding the Touch by Mark Price and Carlos Buhler. Their route followed the Yates/Simpson ascent until approximately the middle of the face, at which point they climbed a narrow, technical gully above the initial ice face and then surmounted a short wall up and left into the ice gully that led directly to the main summit (total of 24 pitches).
- 13 July 2001 "Southern Discomfort", south face by Michel van der Spek, Jay Burbee, and Jeremy Frimer
- 17 July 2001 Noches de "Juerga", west face
- 3 July 2002 Northeast Face, Los Rapidos by Slovenes Marjan Kovač and Pavle Kozjek

== Siula Chico ==
Siula Chico is a subpeak about 6,260 m (20,540 ft) high separated from Siula Grande by an approximately 6,000-metre (20,000 ft) col. Mountaineers considered that the easiest route to its summit was via Siula Grande's summit and it was so climbed by Manfred Sturm's 1966 expedition. Spanish alpinists Jordi Corominas and Oriol Baro made the first ascent of Chico's west face, and second ascent of the peak, in May 2007.

== Glaciers ==
According to some researchers the glaciers between Siula Grande and Yerupaja show a broad increase in the number, size and frequency of crevasses, and bergschrunds. As a result, climbing routes used in the 1970s are today considered impracticable.
