= David Greig (dramatist) =

Scottish playwright and theatre director

- Born: 1969 (age 56–57); Edinburgh, Scotland
- Education: Bristol University
- Occupations: Playwright, theatre director
- Years active: 1994–present
- Children: 2
- Awards: Carol Tambor Best of Edinburgh Award

David Greig (born 1969) is a Scottish playwright and theatre director. His work has been performed at many of the major theatres in Britain, including the Traverse Theatre, Royal Court Theatre, Royal National Theatre, Royal Lyceum Theatre and the Royal Shakespeare Company, and been produced around the world.

== Early life and education ==
Greig was born in Edinburgh in 1969, and was brought up in Nigeria until he was 11, when the family returned to Scotland.

He studied at Bristol University, where he shared a flat with Sarah Kane.

== Career ==
After university, in 1993 he co-founded a drama collective with fellow students Graham Eatough and Nick Powell called Suspect Culture, based in Glasgow. Their work was highly influenced by European theatre. Greig would go on to write the texts for almost all of their shows until 2004, including Timeless (1997), Mainstream (1999), Candide 2000 (2000), Casanova (2001), Lament (2002), and 8000m (2004).

His stand-alone plays, from Stalinland (1992), began to be picked up by major theatres; the Traverse produced Europe (1995), The Architect (1996, made into a film of the same title in 2006), Outlying Islands (2002), Damascus (2007) and Midsummer (a play with songs by Gordon McIntyre, 2008). Paines Plough produced The Cosmonaut's Last Message To The Woman He Once Loved In The Former Soviet Union (1999) and Pyrenees (2005). The RSC commissioned and produced Victoria (2000) and The American Pilot (2005). His sequel to Macbeth, Dunsinane (2010) was premiered at the Hampstead Theatre by the Royal Shakespeare Company. The Speculator (1999) and San Diego (2003) were commissioned by the Edinburgh International Festival. When the National Theatre of Scotland was formed in 2006, Greig served as its first Dramaturg and also wrote an adaptation of Euripides' The Bacchae for them. His adaptation of Alasdair Gray's novel Lanark opened at the Lyceum Theatre as part of the Edinburgh International Festival in 2015. In 2006, he joined the board of the Traverse Theatre.

Greig produced around 50 plays, texts, adaptations, translations, and libretti in the first two decades of his career. Dr Korczak's Example (2004) is a play for young people and Danny 306 + Me 4 Ever (1999) is for puppets. He has produced adaptations of Tintin in Tibet (2005) for the Barbican, London, and Charlie and the Chocolate Factory (2013) for the Theatre Royal, Drury Lane. The Strange Undoing of Prudencia Hart (2011) for the National Theatre of Scotland was designed to be toured to and performed in pubs; partnering with Punchdrunk, it played an extended run from November 2016 to April 2017 at the Heath restaurant in the McKittrick Hotel, home of the similarly immersive theatrical experience Sleep No More in New York City. He has provided English-language versions of foreign plays, including Camus's Caligula (2003), and Strindberg's Creditors (2008). In 2013, he wrote The Events, in which different local choirs perform the musical numbers every night. Lyn Gardner, in The Guardian, chose this as her best piece of theatre in 2013. With local politician Sarah Beattie-Smith of the Scottish Green Party, Greig curated the political discussion show Two Minute Manifesto which toured Scotland in 2015. In 2018 it was announced that he would adapt the classic film Local Hero for the stage, with music by Mark Knopfler. The production opened at Edinburgh's Royal Lyceum Theatre in March 2019. Its 2020 transfer to the Old Vic in London was postponed due to the COVID-19 pandemic in the UK.

Greig took over from Mark Thomson as artistic director of Edinburgh's Royal Lyceum Theatre in 2016. He stepped down at the end of the 2024/2025 season, and was succeeded by James Brining in April 2025. He adapted Aeschylus' The Suppliant Women for the Lyceum in October 2016. The 2019 opening of Greig's first original new play in six years, Adventures With The Painted People, at the Pitlochry Festival Theatre was cancelled due to the COVID-19 pandemic. The play was subsequently adapted for radio and later staged at Pitlochry Festival Theatre in 2021.

== Themes ==
Although there is significant variety in Greig's work, some persistent concerns and motifs are visible. A yearning for connection between characters despite enormous personal, social, cultural and political distances between them; international and global links, represented through travel, desire, fantasies of other cultures; and great value placed on imagination, creativity, and wonder.

== Awards ==
Greig has won the Carol Tambor Best of Edinburgh Award twice; for Midsummer (2012) and The Events (2013). In March 2018 it was announced that Royal Lyceum Theatre productions were shortlisted for awards in 12 categories at the Critics' Awards for Theatre in Scotland.

== Personal life ==
Greig has intervened in public and political debates, such as over Creative Scotland in 2012 and advocating for Scottish independence in the run-up to the Scottish Independence Referendum in 2014.

== Selected list of plays ==
=== Original plays ===
- Europe (1994)
- One Way Street (1995)
- The Architect (1996)
- Caledonia dreaming (1997)
- The Cosmonaut's Last Message to the Woman he once Loved in the Former Soviet Union (1999)
- The Speculator (1999)
- Danny 306 + Me (4Ever) (1999)
- Victoria (2000)
- The Swannsong (2000)
- Dr Korczak’s Example (2001)
- Casanova (2001)
- Outlying Islands (2002)
- San Diego (2003)
- American Pilot (2005)
- Pyrenees (2005)
- Yellow Moon: the Ballad of Leila and Lee (2006)
- Damascus (2007)
- Midsummer (2008)
- Dunsinane (2010)
- The Monster in the Hall (2010)
- The Strange Undoing of Prudencia Hart (2011)
- The Letter of Last Resort (2012)
- The Events (2013)
- Adventures With The Painted People (2020)
- Two Sisters (2024)

=== Translations and adaptations ===
- Battle of Will (2002), Laurent Gaudé
- Caligula (2003), Albert Camus
- Oedipus the visionary (2005), Sophocles
- The Bacchae (2007), Euripides,
- Creditors (2008), August Strindberg
- Peter Pan (2010), adaptation of JM Barrie's original fairy tale
- Charlie and the Chocolate Factory (2013), from the story by Roald Dahl
- Lanark: A Life in Three Acts (2015), from the novel by Alasdair Gray
- The Suppliant Women (2016), Aeschylus
- Touching the Void (2018), adaption of Touching the Void
- Solaris (2019), adaption of Solaris
- Local Hero (2019), adaption of Local Hero
- One Day (2026), adaption of One Day

== Novels ==
- Columba's Bones (2023; published in the United States as The Book of I in 2025)
