= Touching the Void (play) =

2018 play by David Grieg based on the 1988 book

- Original language: English
- Written by: David Greig
- Subject: Survival
- Setting: 1985, Peruvian Andes

Premiere
- Date: 18 September 2018
- Place: Bristol Old Vic

Touching the Void is a play written by David Greig, based on the book of the same name by Joe Simpson. It made its world premiere at the Bristol Old Vic in September 2018, before embarking on a short UK and international tour. The play centres on the true story of Joe Simpson and Simon Yates, climb of the 6,344-metre west face of the Siula Grande in the Peruvian Andes in 1985.

== Production history ==
Touching the Void has been adapted for the stage by David Greig, based on the 1988 book of the same name by Joe Simpson. The book was previously adapted into a docudrama survival film in 2003. On 8 November 2017, it was announced the play would receive its world premiere the following year and would begin previews at the Bristol Old Vic on 8 September 2018, with an official opening night on 18 September, booking for a limited period until 6 October. The production marked the reopening of the venue following refurbishment.

The play is directed by the Artistic Director of Bristol Old Vic Tom Morris, with movement direction by Sasha Milavic Davies, design by Ti Green, lighting design by Chris Davey and composition and sound design by Jon Nicholls. Following its premiere production Touching the Void embarked on a tour to the Royal Lyceum Theatre, Edinburgh and Royal & Derngate, Northampton with whom it was a coproduction. Following its opening night in Bristol it was announced the play would also tour to Hong Kong City Hall, Hong Kong, Perth Theatre, Perth and Eden Court Theatre, Inverness. A typical performance runs two hours and forty minutes, including one interval of 30 mins.

Following completion of the tour Touching the Void transferred to the Duke of York's Theatre in London's West End for a limited run, running from 9 November 2019 until 29 February 2020.

The script of Touching the Void was published by Faber and Faber on 6 September 2018.

Following the closure of the theatre due to the COVID-19 pandemic, the play will be revived at the Bristol Old Vic from 26 to 29 May 2021, where performances will be presented live to both a socially distanced audience as well as broadcast online.

== Synopsis ==
The play is set in 1985, on Siula Grande in the Peruvian Andes. It follows Joe Simpson and Simon Yates as they climb the west face of the Siula Grande, becoming the first climbers to reach the summit using the west face. Descending down the north ridge tragedy struck as Simpson slipped down an ice cliff, breaking his right leg. With Simpson incapacitated Yates lowered Simpson off the North Ridge by tying two 150-foot lengths of rope together to make one rope. With worsening conditions, frost bite and complications with the knots Yates inadvertently lowered Simpson off a cliff and Simpson accidentally dropped one of the cords required to ascend the rope.

Simpson could not climb up the rope, Yates could not pull him back up, the cliff was too high for Simpson to be lowered down, and they could not communicate. Yates had to make the hard decision to cut the rope in order to save his own life. Yates cut the rope, plummeting Simpson down the cliff into a deep crevasse. Exhausted and suffering from hypothermia, Yates dug himself a snow cave to wait out the storm. Assuming Simpson was dead Yates carried on descending the mountain by himself.

Simpson, however, was still alive. He had survived the 150-foot fall despite his broken leg and had landed on a small ledge inside the crevasse. When Simpson regained consciousness, he discovered that the rope had been cut and realized that Yates would presume that he was dead. He therefore had to save himself. It was impossible for Simpson to climb up to the entrance of the crevasse, therefore his only choice was to lower himself deeper into the crevasse and hope that there was another way out. After lowering himself, Simpson found another small entrance and climbed back onto the glacier via a steep snow slope.

In all Simpson spent three days without food and with almost no water, crawling and hopping five miles back to their base camp. Exhausted and almost completely delirious, he reached base camp only a few hours before Yates intended to leave the base camp and return to civilisation.

== Principal roles and original cast ==
Character	Bristol 2018	2018 tour	West End 2019	Bristol & broadcast 2021
Joe Simpson	Josh Williams	Josh Williams	Josh Williams	Josh Williams
Simon Yates	Edward Hayter	Edward Hayter	Angus Yellowlees	Angus Yellowlees
Richard	Patrick McNamee	Patrick McNamee	Patrick McNamee	Patrick McNamee
Sarah	Fiona Hampton	Fiona Hampton	Fiona Hampton	Fiona Hampton
