= Joe Simpson (mountaineer) =

British mountaineer and author

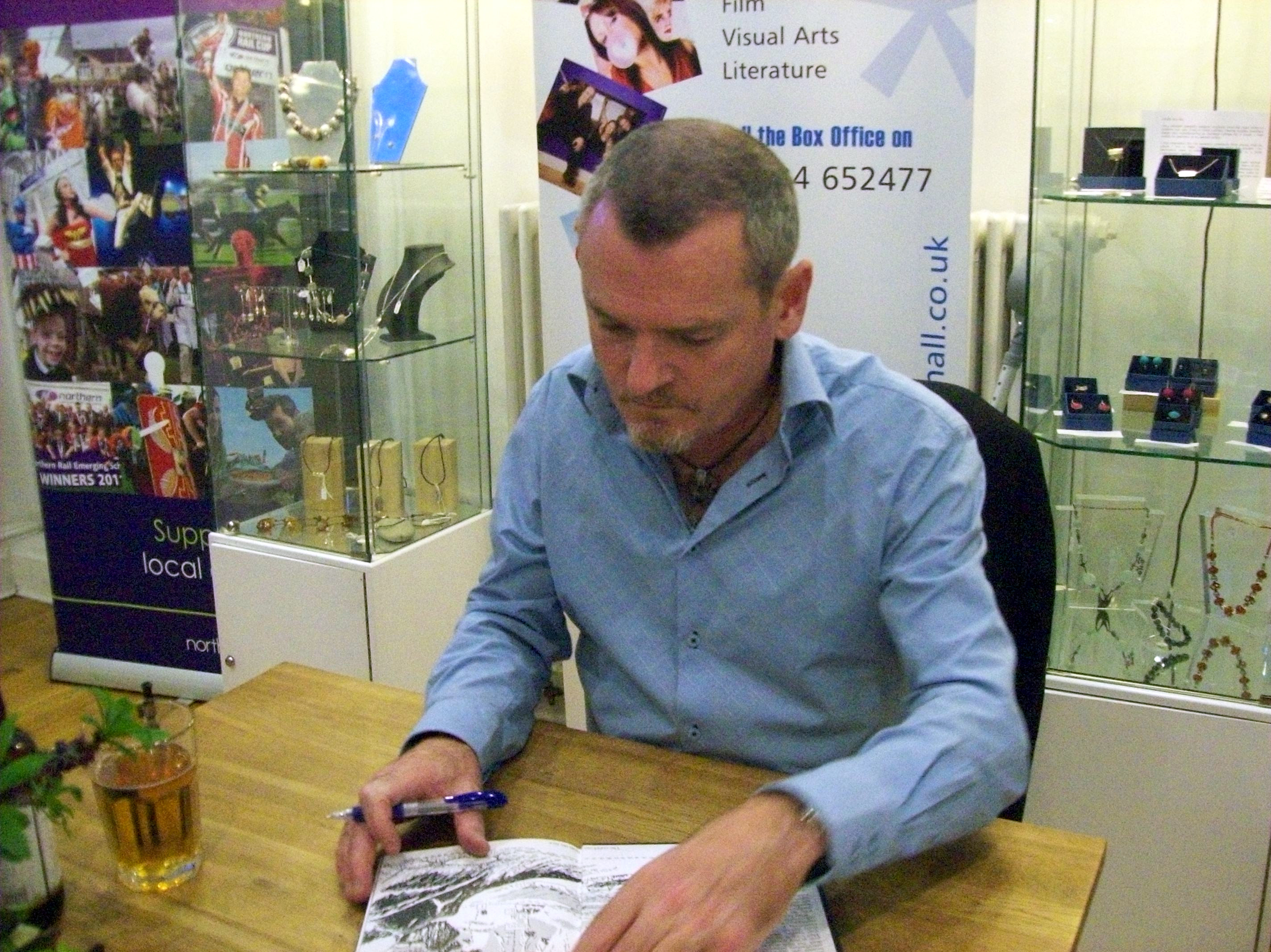
- Simpson in 2013

Personal information
- Born: 13 August 1960 (age 65) Kuala Lumpur, Malaysia

Joe Simpson (born 13 August 1960) is a British mountaineer, author, and motivational speaker. While climbing in Peru in 1985, he suffered severe injuries and was assumed dead by his climbing companion Simon Yates after falling into a crevasse, but he survived and managed to crawl back to his base camp. He described the ordeal in his 1988 book Touching the Void, which has been adapted into a 2003 documentary film and a 2018 stage play, both of the same name.

== Early life ==
Simpson was born on 13 August 1960 to a Scottish father and an Irish mother, in Kuala Lumpur, Malaysia, where his father was stationed with the British Army. From the age of 8, Simpson travelled between schools in Britain and various countries where his father was stationed. Simpson began rock climbing after being introduced to the sport at Peak Scar on the Hambleton Hills in north-eastern Yorkshire by a teacher at Ampleforth College. He was 14 when he read The White Spider by Heinrich Harrer, about the first ascent of the North Face of the Eiger by Harrer with Anderl Heckmair, Fritz Kasparek, and Ludwig Vörg in 1938. Despite the inherent dangers of mountaineering described in the book, this reading sparked a passion for the mountains in Simpson.

== Climbing career ==
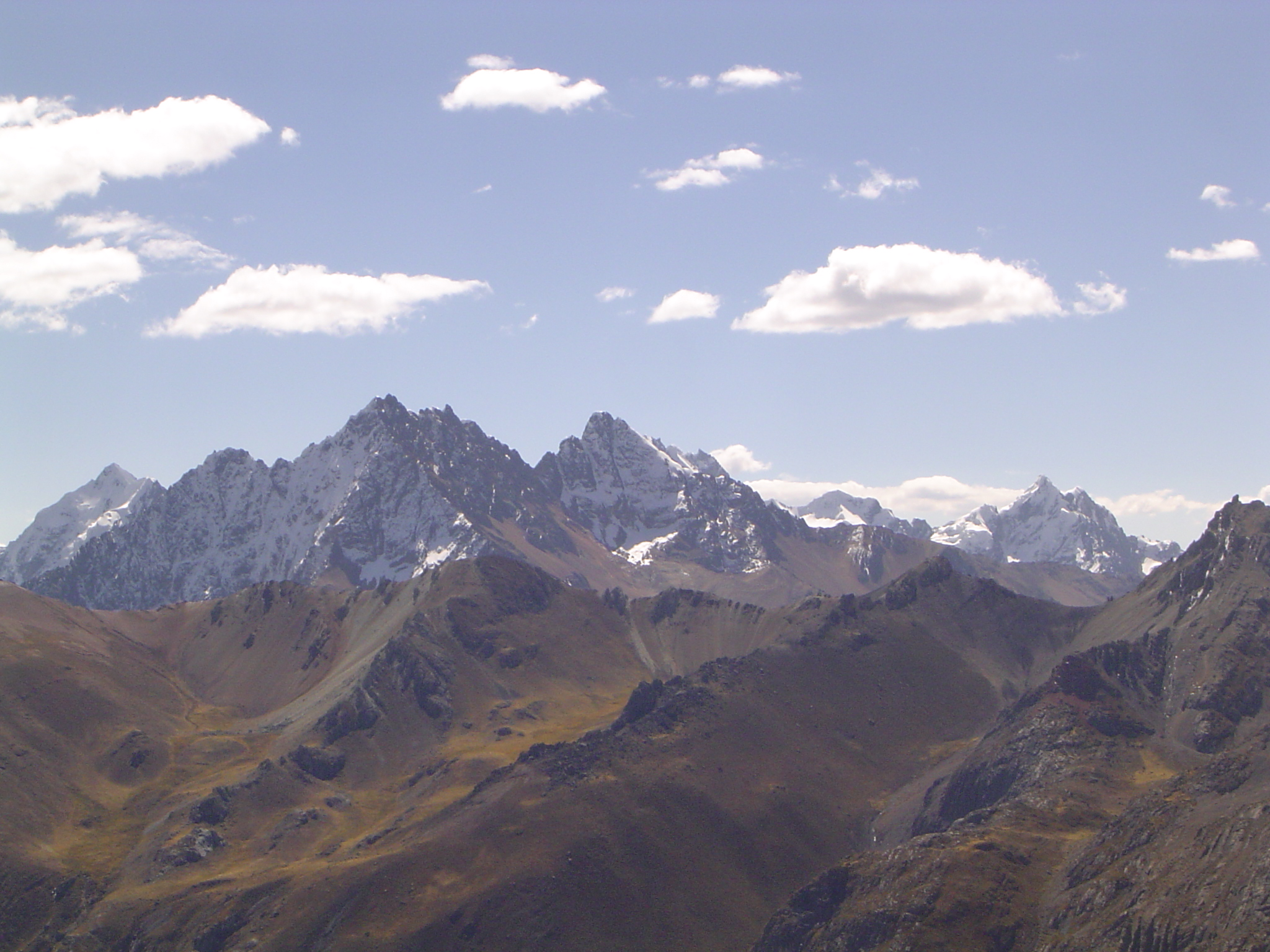
Cordillera Huayhuash

In 1985, Simpson and his climbing partner Simon Yates made a first ascent of the previously unclimbed west face of Siula Grande (6,344 m) in the Cordillera Huayhuash of the Peruvian Andes. On the descent, Simpson broke his right leg in a fall. Yates attempted to rescue Simpson by roping the pair together, with Yates lowering Simpson as far down the mountain as their rope would allow, before descending himself, and repeating the process. However, as weather conditions deteriorated and visibility diminished, he unknowingly lowered Simpson over a cliff edge. Simpson could not climb up the rope, and it was impossible for Yates to pull him up due to his own precarious position. To avoid being pulled off the mountain himself, Yates was forced to cut the rope. Simpson, however, succeeded in rescuing himself and survived.

Simpson published an article about the Siula Grande ordeal in the climbing press shortly afterwards, and later wrote the best-selling book Touching the Void. The book has been translated into 23 languages and has sold almost two million copies worldwide. Simpson wrote further about the Siula Grande expedition in his book This Game of Ghosts as did Yates in his book Against the Wall. A film based on the book was released in 2003. It takes the form of a docudrama with climbing sequences filmed in the European Alps and the Peruvian Andes together with interviews with Simpson, Yates and the third member of the expedition Richard Hawking (a non-climber)

Simpson underwent six surgical operations as a result of the leg injuries sustained on Siula Grande. Doctors told him he would never climb again and that he would have trouble walking for the rest of his life. In 1987, however, he returned to mountain climbing.

== Later activities ==
His later non-fiction books describe other expeditions and his changing feeling towards extreme mountaineering brought on by the many deaths that surround the pursuit. A bad fall broke Simpson's left ankle while climbing with Mal Duff in 1991 on Pachermo in Nepal, and is described in his third book This Game of Ghosts. Simpson also made six unsuccessful attempts on the North Face of the Eiger from 2000 to 2003 with his regular climbing partner Ray Delaney, all of which had to be aborted due to bad weather. One of his books, The Beckoning Silence, was made into a documentary shown on Channel 4 in October 2007. The book won the 2003 National Outdoor Book Award (Outdoor Literature category).

== Bibliography ==
Except as noted, all works are non-fiction.

- Touching the Void (Jonathan Cape), 1988
- The Water People (fiction) (Jonathan Cape), 1992
- This Game of Ghosts (Jonathan Cape), 1993
- Storms of Silence (Jonathan Cape), 1996
- Dark Shadows Falling (Jonathan Cape), 1996
- The Beckoning Silence (Jonathan Cape), 2001
- The Sound of Gravity (fiction) (Jonathan Cape), 2011
- Walking the Wrong Side of the Grass (fiction) (DirectAuthors.com), 2018

== See also ==
- List of climbers
