= Simon Yates (mountaineer) =

English mountaineer

Simon Yates (born 1963) is an English mountaineer. In 1985, he and Joe Simpson made the first ascent of the west face of Siula Grande in the Huayhuash mountain range in the Peruvian Andes. After Simpson fell and badly broke his leg on the descent, Yates lowered him gradually down the mountain with ropes, but in extreme weather conditions, Simpson fell over a cliff edge. Yates was forced to cut the rope attaching him to Simpson to avoid being pulled over as well. Simpson survived, and recounted the story in the book Touching the Void, which was later adapted into a film.

== Career ==
Together with Simpson, Yates climbed Siula Grande (6,344 metres; 20,814 ft) in 1985, via the hitherto unconquered West Face. The climb was difficult and was accomplished in, at times, challenging blizzard weather conditions. The climbers commenced their descent via the peak's North Ridge which proved to be more difficult than they had anticipated. Shortly after the pair left the summit Yates fell through a cornice and started plummeting down the 4,500 ft (1,400 m) face they had just climbed but his fall was arrested by their climbing ropes. After a bivouac high on the peak, the pair continued their descent the following morning but then Simpson fell from an ice cliff on the North Ridge of the mountain, breaking his right leg and heel. To continue the descent, Yates then used their two ropes tied together (total length 300 ft (91 m)) to lower Simpson down the mountain in stages in deteriorating weather conditions. Yates lowered Simpson 3,000 ft (910 m) by this method and felt they were regaining control of the situation despite a worsening storm.

However, although the pair had almost descended to the relative safety of the glacier, Simpson went over an unseen cliff edge as he was being lowered, which meant that he was hanging free with only Yates's hold on the rope to prevent him falling. Simpson was unable to get his weight off the rope and Yates could not lower him any further. The two climbers were stuck in this situation for a considerable time (Yates estimated in excess of an hour and a half) during which time the weight of Simpson on the rope was pulling Yates from his unbelayed stance, 150 ft (46 m) above Simpson and an unknown additional distance above the glacier. To avoid being pulled off the mountain to almost certain death, Yates cut the rope. Simpson fell approximately 50 ft (15 m) to the entrance to a crevasse and a further distance onto a ledge within the crevasse. Yates dug a snowhole in the slope behind his stance and spent the rest of the night there. The following morning Yates completed his descent to the glacier and being unable to find Simpson he concluded his companion must have been killed, he returned to base camp that day. However, Simpson survived the fall and managed to climb and crawl out of the crevasse and reached base camp four days later.

Yates's rescue efforts contributed significantly to saving Simpson's life despite his decision, near the end of rescue, that he needed to cut their climbing rope to prevent a fatal fall. Yates initially received some criticism for cutting the rope from some not in possession of the full facts relating to his rescue of Simpson. Simpson has always vehemently defended Yates's actions, saying he would have done it himself had the roles been reversed and that his initial motivation for writing Touching the Void was to set out the full circumstances in response to ill-informed criticism of Yates.

Yates commented that after he moved away from Sheffield he had 'hardly seen Joe (Simpson) for nine years' until they went to Peru to film some scenes for the Touching the Void documentary.

Immediately after return from the Siula Grande climb, Yates went to the European Alps and climbed the North Face of the Eiger partnered by John Silvester. Subsequently, he has participated in many expeditions including those that made the first ascents of Laila Peak and Nemeka in Pakistan and several expeditions to the Cordillera Darwin in Chile. In 2007 Yates acted as a guide to two Icelandic climbers in a successful attempt to climb Ama Dablam (6,812 metres/22,349 ft) in the Khumbu region of Nepal to the south of the Mount Everest massif and a film of the expedition was made: Ama Dablam: Beyond the Void. In July 2009, Yates successfully led a group of four clients to the summit of Lenin Peak (7134 m). In September 2010, Yates planned to return to the Cordillera Huayhuash 25 years after his climb with Simpson, to lead a group of trekkers to the base camp of Siula Grande and to the viewpoint over Cerro Bella Vista, from where the path along which Simpson crawled to safety can be seen.

Yates has authored three autobiographical books about mountaineering. The first, Against the Wall, is about an expedition to climb a new route on the Central Torres del Paine in Chilean Patagonia and was short-listed for the Boardman Tasker Prize for Mountain Literature. The book details how that particular climb led to Yates re-evaluating the priorities in his life as a climber. The Flame of Adventure describes a series of climbing expeditions around the world. His most recent book, The Wild Within, describes expeditions to the Cordillera Darwin in Tierra del Fuego, the Wrangell St-Elias ranges on the Alaska-Yukon border, and eastern Greenland.

== Personal life ==
Yates was born in Croft, Leicestershire, England and educated at Lutterworth Grammar School. In the 1980s he moved to Sheffield to complete a degree in biochemistry at the University of Sheffield. After graduation Yates concentrated on mountaineering and did rope access work to support himself financially.

Yates lives in Cumbria with his wife and their two children. His wife and children have accompanied him on some of his later expeditions.

== See also ==
- List of climbers, alpinists and mountaineers
