= Mercy Murugi =

Kenyan film producer

- Born: Kenya
- Education: Bachelor of Science International Business Administration
- Alma mater: United States International University
- Occupations: Film producer; Production manager
- Years active: 2005–present
- Known for: Kibera Kid; Togetherness Supreme; Stranded with Cash Peters
- Height: 5 ft (152 cm)
- Honours: Top 40 under 40 Women in Kenya (2012)

Mercy Murugi (born 19 September 1983) is a notable Kenyan film, TV producer and creative project manager who has worked on a number of local and international projects including Worse Than War, Stranded with Cash Peters. She has worked with National Geographic, Discovery Channel, BBC, among other global production houses and TV channels.

== Education ==
Murugi attended Limuru Girls' School, where she obtained her Kenya Certificate of Secondary Education (KCSE) and participated in extracurricular activities including drama and student leadership.

She later enrolled at Wantech Computer College, where she earned a diploma in information technology. Between 2003 and 2004, she attended the Andrew Crawford Media Training School, receiving a Diploma in Television and Radio Production.

Murugi subsequently pursued further studies at United States International University Africa, where she studied International Business Administration.

== Career ==
Murugi began her career in film production in the mid-2000s, working on both local and international projects. One of her earliest roles was as a production manager on the television series Stranded with Cash Peters, where she contributed to location-based storytelling across Africa.

She later worked as a production coordinator on the short film Kibera Kid (2006), which gained international recognition and highlighted social issues in Nairobi’s informal settlements. During this period, she was involved in several international productions, including Degrassi: Doing What Matters and the documentary Worse Than War (2008), where she served as production manager.

Murugi gained further recognition for her role as production manager on the award-winning Kenyan feature film From a Whisper (2008), which received critical acclaim for its portrayal of the 1998 U.S. embassy bombing in Nairobi.

In 2010, she served as a producer on Togetherness Supreme, a film directed by Nathan Collett that explored ethnic tensions in Kenya following the 2007–2008 post-election violence. The film received multiple international awards, including recognition at the Africa Movie Academy Awards and the Santa Barbara International Film Festival.

Murugi has also collaborated with major international broadcasters and organizations, including the National Geographic Society, BBC, and Discovery Channel, working in various production capacities. Her work spans documentaries, television series, and feature films, often focusing on African narratives and social impact storytelling. In addition to her production work, she is the co-founder of the Kibera Film School, an initiative under the Hot Sun Foundation that provides training and mentorship to young filmmakers from underserved communities.Through this initiative, she has played a key role in nurturing emerging talent in Kenya’s film industry.

Her later work includes producing projects such as Brave Girl Rising (2019), a documentary focused on girls’ education, and Earthbound: Nzambi Matee (2023), which highlights environmental innovation in Kenya.

== Filmography ==
=== Film and television ===
| Year | Project | Role | Notes | Ref. |
|---|---|---|---|---|
| 2005–2006 | Stranded with Cash Peters | Production manager | TV series (segments) | |
| 2006 | Kibera Kid | Production coordinator | Short film | |
| 2007 | Afrika, mon amour | Production coordinator | TV mini-series (3 episodes) | |
| 2007 | Hunter Hunted | Production assistant | TV series (1 episode) | |
| 2007 | Degrassi: Doing What Matters | Production manager | TV movie | |
| 2008 | Worse Than War | Production manager | Documentary (overseas) | |
| 2008 | From a Whisper | Production manager | Feature film | |
| 2010 | Togetherness Supreme | Producer | Feature film | |
| 2012 | First | Unit producer | Kenyan unit | |
| 2013 | Girl Rising | Production manager | Documentary (Kenya) | |
| 2015 | Miss Nobody | Producer | Short film | |
| 2019 | Brave Girl Rising | Kenya producer | Short film | |
| 2023 | Earthbound: Nzambi Matee | Producer | Documentary | |
