= Cinema of Kenya =

The cinema of Kenya refers to the film industry of Kenya. Although a very small industry by western comparison, Kenya has produced or been a location for film since the early 1950s when Men Against the Sun was filmed in 1952. Although, in the United States, jungle epics that were set in the country were shot in Hollywood as early as the 1940s.

== History ==
Origins of Kenyan cinema dates around 1936 with the Bantu Education Cinema Experiment of 1935 was a colonial initiative in South Africa aimed at using films as a tool for education and social control among Black South Africans. The experiment was part of the broader Bantu Education policy, which sought to segregate and control the education of Black Africans under apartheid rule. Dr. W.H. Notcutt's arrival in Tanganyika (present-day Tanzania) in 1936 marked a significant development in the colonial administration's efforts to utilize films for education and propaganda purposes.

As the Director of the Bantu Education Department in South Africa, Notcutt brought his expertise and experience to Tanganyika, where he spearheaded the production of educational films aimed at the local population. These films were part of broader colonial initiatives to influence and control indigenous communities, disseminating government propaganda and promoting colonial ideologies. Notcutt's involvement in Tanganyika underscores the widespread use of cinema as a tool of colonial governance across various parts of Africa during the early 20th century. By using multiple languages, the colonial authorities aimed to reach a broader audience and convey their messages more effectively across different ethnic communities in Tanganyika. Thus the birth of Kenyan cinema began as he produced films in Kikuyu, Luo and Swahili etc. Films include Post Office Savings, Bank, Tax and Progress. others were directed towards colonial settler famers such as Coffee Under Banana Shade. He also produced one African folklore film The Hear and the Leopard.

Notcutt realized local personnel can be trained to make cinema production much cheaper, Notcutt's film production in Tanganyika involved the training and employment of local African individuals, although they may have been limited to roles such as assistants, technicians, or actors in minor or stereotypical roles. The extent of their involvement and the opportunities provided for training and African participation in filmmaking 1936 films were produced and cut by Africans from start to finish.

1939 was the year the British set up Colonial film unit with the East African Branch In Kenya. The Colonial Film Unit (CFU) in Nairobi was an entity established during the colonial era in Kenya, then known as British East Africa. The CFU was part of the British colonial administration's efforts to produce films for various purposes, including propaganda, education, and documentation of colonial activities.

The primary goal of the Colonial Film Unit in Nairobi was to create films that promoted British colonial interests and ideologies, while also serving as a tool for social control and cultural assimilation among the indigenous population. These films often depicted colonial narratives that portrayed British rule in a positive light and reinforced stereotypes about African societies and cultures.

While the specific films produced by the Colonial Film Unit in Nairobi may vary, they typically included documentaries, educational films, and propaganda pieces that highlighted various aspects of colonial life, such as agriculture, infrastructure development, missionary work, and the activities of colonial administrators. In 1955 the Colonial Film Unit changed to Oversee Film and Television Center.

After Kenya gained independence from the United Kingdom on 12 December 1963, the end of British colonial rule and the transition to an independent Kenyan film industry. However, the legacy of the Colonial Film Unit in Nairobi continues to be studied as part of the broader history of colonialism and media representation in Africa.

== Kenyan cinema ==
Rather than featured films with fictional content, Kenya has mostly produced documentary films often relating the conditions of the people and poverty in the main cities of Kenya. Feature films before 2000 include The Battle of the Sacred Tree (1995) by Wanjiru Kinyanjui which won several awards (OCIC and the Black Filmmakers Hall of Fame award in the US), 'Saikati' (1992) and 'Saikati Enkabaani' (1998) by Anne Mungai, The Married Bachelor (1997) by Ingolo wa Keya. Kolor Mask (1985) by Sao Gamba is considered the first Kenyan feature film based on a Kenyan student who returns home from England with a white woman as his wife.

Since 2000 feature films on DV technology production have increased in the country. Director Judy Kibinge produced several trailblazing fiction films in the 2000s including Dangerous Affair (2002), Project Daddy (2004), and Something Necessary (2013). They include Money & the Cross by Njeri Karago, Babu's Babies by Christine Bala, Naliaka is Going by Albert Wandago, The Price of a Daughter and Behind Closed Doors by Jane Murago-Munene, The Green Card by Brutus Sirucha, Malooned by Bob Nyanja, The Great Betrayal by Ingolo wa Keya, All Girls Together by Cajetan Boy, Help by Robert Bresson and From a Whisper by Wanuri Kahiu, and Jitu Films movies: Mob Doc, R2 Security, Zeinabu Rudi Nyumbani, Chasing Moses, Selfish, Me, My Wife and Her Guru, Grave Yard and Through Hell; and The Hammer by Cezmiq Cast, and the banned horror film Otto the Bloodbath.

Numerous short fictions are also on the increase such as The Baisikol (1997) by Ingolo wa Keya, Ras Star by Wanuri Kahiu, Subira (2007) by Kenya-based Indian film director Ravneet Sippy Chadha, Life in D Major by Angelo Kinyua, and Extracts of Me by William Owusu.

Other low-budget independent filmmakers using digital technology to shoot their films and sell them locally on DVD and VCD format have spawned the Riverwood Industry. Though it originally takes its name from River-road, the busy street where music tapes and electronics are sold, Riverwood is fast capturing the attention of the mainstream TV stations and pan-African broadcasters. Mburu Kimani's The Race earned an award at the inaugural Kalasha Awards (Kenya's TV and Film Awards) for "Best Riverwood Film". Other films in this genre include Simiyu Barasa's Toto Millionaire (2007), and numerous other vernacular films like Kihenjo and Machangi.

Films such as 2006's I Want to Be a Pilot relates an emotional tale of a young boy living in poverty in Nairobi who has dreams and aspirations of becoming an airline pilot and being set free from his life of hardship.

In 2007 Vivid features, a big Kenyan Media house, decided to diversify from their traditional services and venture into local feature film production. During this time Vivid managed to produce 24 Kenyan feature films under the name of Jitu Films with different directors such as Alexandros Konstantaras, Evelyn Kahungu and Hawa Essuman. Jitu tried to help to create a dependable market for Kenyan films by helping developing a cinema going and a DVD buying culture for local Kenyan films as well as reaching other audiences outside Africa. To beat piracy Jitu has their original DVDs on sale only for under a dollar in all big Supermarkets and shops . The DVDs are original high standard quality with extra menus with other film trailers, etc. In 2010 Jitu Film's Otto: the Blood Bath earned its reputation not only by being the first Kenyan Horror movie being banned the last years by the Kenyan Censorship Board as "Too horrific even to an adult" but by winning the first prize as the Best East African Film in the last edition of the Rwanda Film Festival.

Film such as 2010's Togetherness Supreme, a fictional feature film by Nathan Collett have received national and international attention for revealing some of issues affecting Kenyan society. Togetherness Supreme tells the story of Kamau, an artist, who uses his talent to promote change in Kibera, and is a story of love, conflict, and ultimately, of reconciliation.

Kibera Kid directed by Kenya-based director Nathan Collett is a short twelve-minute film which covers themes of crime and poverty in the slums of Kibera, Nairobi and also morality as the young protagonist must make a choice between living with a gang of thieves or living a life free of crime. The story is fictional but the circumstances and reality depicted are not. The film received seven international awards and received attention at various film festivals worldwide including the Berlin Film Festival and it was accoladed with a Student Emmy in Hollywood. It has been profiled by BBC, Reuters, Al Jazeera English and many others. Other than this directors such as Collett have shot other short films such as The Oath, a 2005 historical short set in the 1950s during the Mau Mau uprising under the British colonialism in Kenya. It portrays the struggle between two brothers on opposite sides of the conflict. Many of the actors used in the film were descendants of Kenyan freedom fighters.

Whilst the number of films shot in the country has increased in recent years, the country lacks the financial resources and investment needed to produce larger scale feature films and employ professional actors. It is far behind other African film producers such as South Africa and Egypt who have been producing feature films since the early twentieth century.

=== Government promotion of film making ===
The Kenyan government has made a conscious effort to develop Kenyan cinema as an industry, and in 2005 the government helped establish the Kenya Film Commission (KFC) which came into operation in mid-2006. The Kenya Film Commission aims to promote the industry not only within the country but to raise international awareness and interest from potential investors. The commission falls under the Ministry of Information and Communication that is headed by Samuel Poghisio. It supports the Kenyan film industry by providing facilities for screenings and filming and organising various workshops to educate local film-makers seeking to enter film production. It is also responsible for advising on licensing and immigration; as well as facilitate the filming process for film makers. The commission is also establishing a database that will list film directors, producers, agents, local talent, stakeholders and service providers to raise the profile of the Kenyan film industry.

In 2012 the Ministry of Education introduced film production in schools, colleges and universities drama festival. This project coordinated by Dr. Simon Peter Otieno of the department of Literature, University of Nairobi saw schools, colleges and universities attempt film-making in the festival. In 2012 the films Conflicted Successions by the Kenya Institute of Mass Communication, Time by Elimu Academy, A Time to Cry by Chogoria Girls' High School, Benji by Lions Primary School, Flashback by Karima Girls' high school, The First Drop by Kayole One Primary School, A Story is Told by Nyagatugu Boys' High School, Angel by Kakamega High School, The Contest by Kenya High School, Anne-Brittah by Bulimbo Girls' High School, Dreams of Tomorrow by OLM Mugoiri Girls' High School, Last Friday at Ten by Gitwe Girls' High School and Pressure Points by Menengai High School were major highlights. Being the first year of the festival the quality of productions was surprisingly high. A few of the presentations were experimental and lacked the technical quality.

2013 saw what would be arguably the second Science Fiction story in Kenya after Pumzi (2010). This was a film titled Messenger by Rwathia Girls' High School that presented a story of an alien that steals the identity of a form one student. Other highlights in the secondary school category included A Rose for Salome by Chogoria Girls' High School, The Red Rose by Nyagatugu Boys' High School, A Letter to Auntie by TumuTumu Girls' High School, Sins and Scenes by Our Lady of Mercy Mugoiri Girls' high School, Black Rose by St. Annes Secondary School Lioki, The Portrait by Kangubiri Girls' High School, Tumours of Bitterness by Othaya Boys' High School and Kosa La Mwisho by Kajembe High School.

The primary school category saw the screening of Words by Elimu Academy. In the colleges and universities category the film to mention was Remember the Name by the Kenya Institute of Mass Communication, Love Taken to a Mysterious Place by United States International University, The Twist by Mount Kenya University,

Let's Play Pretend by Moi University. In a bid to promote participation in this new genre in the drama and film festival, the Ministry of Education introduced genres like documentary, cinematic poetry, screen-narrative, screen-dance and adverts. In 2013 many Early Childhood institutions participated in the screen poetry category. The screen-dance was presented by Kangubiri Girls' High School, Kayole One Primary School and Nkamathi Primary School.

The interest developed in learning institutions was very high with the number of film/video productions going up yearly. The productions though experimental in many respects have attained the professional quality. In 2014 there were 16 entries in the annual Kalasha Film and Television awards which were rated very well by the judges but the schools and students were never awarded appropriately because of a shortage of enough funds for the event. Some of the themes have been bold and very enterprising, including successful venture into sci-fi. A list of quality films featured between 2013 and 2014 is as in the table wiki table 1 on the right side of this page:

In 2014 the secondary school category was won by Kangubiri Girls' High School with the film titled Bury My Bones But Keep My Words (A story about a girl who was warned by her mother not to take free gifts as she headed out to high school but who encounters a gift she cannot resist; of attaining supernatural powers). The Universities films had United States International University and the University of Nairobi winning top awards. The University of Nairobi produced a film titled The Epitaph (A story about a traumatised girl who is in campus but who cannot forget that she lost her brother in a violent students' strike in high school in which she participated unwillingly).

The primary schools were led by Elimu Academy that won top honours with their film Maya which was a true story featuring how several pupils of a school died on the road due to neglect by the school administration. Nairobi Primary School had a very well done documentary on the school. St. Eugene's Primary School from western Kenya also presented another winning documentary titled Future Between the Rocks featuring how the pupils in the school face challenges of poverty by making the difficult choice of either going to school or going to break rock in a nearby quarry to get money for their poor families. Kayole One Primary School produced an interesting screen dance titled Mutuku about a child who is enticed to drugs but who comes back to his senses and returns to excel in school.

In 2015 the institutions that featured broadcast quality films/videos were as in the table wiki table 2 on the right side of this page:

Many institutions participated in 2015 in the festival that was held in Nakuru town at Menengai High School. The total number of films was 152 but a majority were experimentations that needed a lot of skilled input. The few mentioned above were more or less ones that had considerable good quality in shooting, acting and editing. This pointed at the need to give more workshops to the teachers to equip them more for film/video production.

Very remarkable in this venture is the film production by Early Childhood Learning centers also known as ECDs. These are institutions that admit children of the pre-school going ages between 4 years and 6 years. Nairobi county has always had more participation by ECD centers since the inception of film in the schools' programme. The children and their teachers were to produce a video poem recited by the children and the attempts were very exciting. Our Lady of Mercy ECD center produced Teacher Makasi a film about a child who does not understand why her teacher marks her mathematics wrong when she adds 1+1 and gets 11.

Kamandura Girls' High School stole the viewers hearts with a witty script titled Anti-Dre which won many awards including the overall winning film. It is the story of a drug peddler who is employed as a teacher in a school. He finds fertile ground to do his business among the students until events catch up with him. Moi Nairobi Girls' High School produced a film No Behaviour about a girl who is befriended by a young man, made pregnant and dumped. Rwathia Girls' High School came up with yet another science fiction film Guardian Angel of an angel who assumes human identity to come and save a girl from her evil habits. Kiaguthu Boys' High School, being among the few boy-schools that ventured into film production explored the rights of the boy-child in The Intricacies of a Boy Child. In the short film category of the oral narrative genre Loreto Msongari Girls' High School amused the viewers with Dabo Tap, a story about a girl who dates a man in the social media only to realize it is her high school teacher. The category of the screen dance which is akin to music video was still an uphill task and the films presented were weak in production skills. The documentary was also very weak with few skilled productions.

In 2015 the quality of primary school production was very low. Due to the government policy of free primary education many public schools were not funded by the parents and therefore lacked funds to produce video/films or even effectively participate in the annual drama festival. The winning film by Gilgil Hills Academy, Flips of Darkness was about the rights of disabled children. This was arguably the only feature film that did not raise many queries in terms of skill and production. New entrants Nyaka Njeru Primary School, a public school from the highlands region of Meru produced an interesting documentary titled Cactus about the difficulty the school experiences.

In the colleges category the Kenya Institute of Mass Communication dominated with quality productions. The college teaches film production and broadcast journalism. Their most remarkable film in the year was their documentary titled Omurogi that explored the practice of witchcraft in Kisii county (region around Lake Victoria). Even though very few colleges participated in film/video production with Asumbi Teachers College being a sole participant among the teachers' colleges.

A handful of universities participated with St. Pauls' University producing a thriller action-packed film titled My Testimony about crime and drugs. Moi University, which had consistently participated since 2013 produced Cycle 28 a story about difficulties and intrigues of relationships in campus life.

In 2016 the festival was in Meru School in Meru county where the participation increased with an entry of 218 films. This necessitated that the film halls be increased from one to two so as to manage the load within the given ten days. Because the high schools had the highest entries they were accorded one hall while the next hall was for primary schools, colleges and universities. This however brought another challenge of content. The colleges films tended to have adult content that is unsuitable for the children which the managing committee promised to address the following year.

Remarkably though, the standards of films in 2016 was amazingly high. This was evidence that the workshops to train teachers on film skills held at State House Girls' High School in Nairobi had borne fruit. The secondary category was very competitive with schools effectively going for the top awards. Kangubiri Girls' High School had a winning thriller Science fiction story titled The Return to Planet Earth. The story is about a generation of African children who were evacuated to a planet in the Andromeda galaxy before the third world war broke out. Four hundred years into the future their great-grandchildren, who are at the time very advanced in technology return to learn from the unfortunate planet. State House Girls' High School produced The Principal's Daughter a story about a girl who is bashed by teachers, students and even workers because she is the principal's daughter which leads her to joining a clandestine underground movement. Kagumo High School was judged the best boys' school coming third with a film Fire of Passion that explored how parent's irresponsibility can lead to distracting the child's attention at school.

The documentaries were much improved with Maryhill Girls' High School taking the top judges award with The Unspoken a film about how sexual abuse affects the girl child. Many institutions invested well in the documentary. The screen dance and the screen choral verse were however weak needed more skilled input.

The full list of all the institutions that participated.

The primary schools improved in 2016. Elimu Academy won top honours with their film Tamasha about the pain of a girl whose father, a soldier, has to go to Somalia for peace-keeping. Rockside Academy explored the effect of absent parents on children in Absent Again. Kayole One Primary School produced Unknown Angels about a child who is poor in mathematics but who is taught the secrets of mathematics by two unknown boys who happen to be angels.

The colleges and universities had a low turnout in 2016. Asumbi Teachers' College, Tambach Teachers' Training College, Machakos Teachers' Training College and Shanzu Teachers' College dominated the teacher's colleges with good quality films.

Among the tertiary colleges Kenya Institute of Mass Communication and Mombasa Aviation college dominated.

The universities posted acceptable standards with Moi University, Maseno University, Mount Kenya University and the University of Nairobi presenting films. (Secondary School films)

(ECD centers, Primary Schools, Colleges and Universities)

- (ECDs – Early Childhood Centers)

The Ministry of Education is currently exploring possibilities of distributing the films by professional companies in the Kenyan market. The management committee also launched a film magazine, The Edufilmer, which is in circulation in schools through the University of Nairobi.

Although film is the latest genre in the drama festival, it is set to influence largely the playing field in the professional arena in Kenyan cinema. The Kenyan film scene has many experts who learnt on the job through visiting production houses from outside the country. This schools film festival gives the opportunity to start nurturing academically schooled film-makers through the thousands of students who get introduced to film production at the school level. This will definitely be a game changer even going by what these pupils and students have conjured so far in 2016. Some of the trailers of the schools films can be found at Kenya Schools, Colleges and Universities Films link on YouTube.

In Nairobi the Hot Sun Foundation was established to help train and expose the talents of young people living in the areas of poverty and educate them in filmmaking, acting, script writing, camerawork. The foundation was responsible for producing films such as Kibera Kid.

Aspiring Kenyan actors outside the Hot Sun Foundation offices in Kibera, Nairobi

== Films ==
=== Selected films ===
- 1986 - Kolormask
- 1981– Rise and Fall of Idi Amin
- 1997 - the baisikol
- 1997 - the married bachelor
- 1998 - Saikati Enkabaani
- 1999 – To Walk with Lions
- 2001 - The Great Betrayal
- 2005 – The Constant Gardener
- 2006 – I Want to Be a Pilot
- 2006 – Kibera Kid
- 2008 – From a Whisper
- 2009 – Shuga (TV series)
- 2010 – The First Grader
- 2010 – Pumzi
- 2011 – The Rugged Priest
- 2012 – Nairobi Half Life
- 2013 – Something Necessary
- 2014 – House of Lungula
- 2014 – Fundi-Mentals
- 2014 – Veve
- 2015 – Intellectual Scum
- 2015 – Mizizi
- 2018 – Supa Modo
- 2018 – Rafiki

== Film festivals ==
The Riverwood Academy Awards started with a Premier Gala on 15 March 2014 at Alliance Francais Nairobi Kenya. The event is organised by Riverwood Ensemble, a coming together of over 200 film producers from all over Kenya. The producers are self funded people making 100% homegrown Kenyan Film.

The annual Lola Kenya Screen (also known as Lola Kenya Children's Screen) audiovisual media festival, skill-development programme and market for children and youth in eastern Africa was established by creative and cultural entrepreneur, arts and culture journalist and creative writer Ogova Ondego in October 2005.

Deriving its name from a Bantu language word meaning watch or see films in Kenya, the first edition of the festival was held in Nairobi between 7 and 12 August 2006. The subsequent editions ran 6–11 August 2007; 11–16 August 2008; 10–15 August 2009; 9–14 August 2010; and 8–13 August 2011; in that order. Lola Kenya Screen focuses on films by, for and with children and youth where children are given the opportunity to participate in the film selection, programme presentation, film jury, and in the making of short films.

Following the first event in 2006, Films by Children for Children, the first nine-short animation made won the Grand Prize at the 5th World Summit on Media for Children/1st Kids for Kids Africa festival, and went on to be shown in countries such as Germany, Poland, Finland, Kenya, Australia, China, Denmark, and Brazil and other African countries such as South Africa, Rwanda, Tanzania, Uganda, Democratic Republic of Congo and Senegal.

The second production, a three-film and three-song compilation titled African Folk Tales Animated, has been shown in all the continents including Oceania and has picked three awards—Most Creative Project, Special Jury Prize, Africa Grand Prize—in Africa and Europe. The third production, Africa-i-Motion, was made in 2008 and is currently on the children and youth film circuit.

Kibera Kid film production set on the slums in Kibera, Nairobi in 2006.

The festival gives aspiring children the opportunity to collaborate with international partners and to also educate them in film production, screenplay writing, cinematography, and in the art department and sound production. Eastern Africa's premier audiovisual media platform for children and youth, Lola Kenya Screen has between August 2006 and August 2011 showcased more than 1950 films from 102 nations representing all the six continents in various genres, formats and lengths. Additionally, Lola Kenya Screen has mentored 154 children and youth in filmmaking, cultural journalism, film judging, MCeeing, television drama production and documentary film production for children and youth.

The 3rd Lola Kenya Screen ( 11–16 August 2008), attracted participation from Kenya, Uganda, Tanzania, and Zimbabwe, with all participants coming in to watch the wide variety of films from 56 nations and to be equipped with skills for making films, appreciating and judging audiovisual media production, presenting programmes and filing daily reports on the festival. Lola Kenya Screen was conceived as a movement that uses appropriate and available technologies to deliver audiovisual media content that complements, enhances, entertains and promotes learning among children and youth in the promotion of literacy, gender equity, independent thought, human rights, environmental responsibility and global health.

Through her programmes, Lola Kenya Screen explores, identifies and nurtures creative talent among children and youth in areas such as journalism, film-making, arts appraisal and appreciation, and organisation and presentation of cultural and creative events. This is aimed at equipping children and youth with the skills to understand, appreciate, and create quality audiovisual productions in particular and arts in general. While the Festival Press is aimed at uplifting the standards of creative and cultural journalism in eastern Africa, the Production Workshop empowers children and youth to make at least five quality, low-budget, moving images per year.

Programme Presentation, as the title suggest, empowers children and youth to organise and present events and programmes. Such children are usually in charge of the programme during the six days of the festival. The Film Jury, on the other hand, seeks to inculcate in participants skills with which to critically appreciate and appraise creativity in general and film in particular. The jury members watch and award films in competition. The official Lola Kenya Screen Jury consists only of children and youth. Out of the recognition that unless adults are sensitised into creating for and with children, the aim of putting children and youth on the public agenda could become a cropper, Lola Kenya Screen 2008 also worked with practising filmmakers in the production of documentaries for children and youth. The 7th Lola Kenya Screen is scheduled for 6–11 August 2012.

== Films shot in Kenya ==
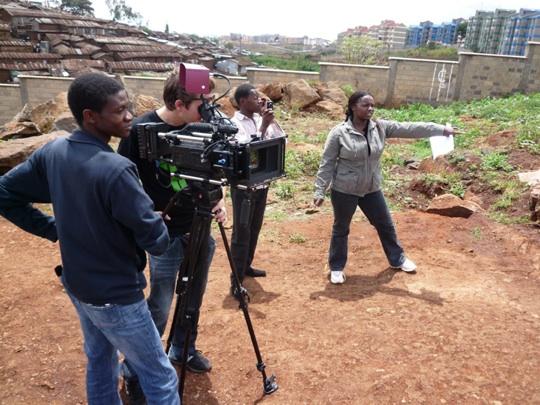
Shooting feature film Togetherness Supreme in Kibera and with the collaboration with Kibera youth trainees.

The film Maasai: The Rain Warriors a cinematic epic was shot entirely in Kenya but cast a number of local Maasai warriors who spoke Maa dialogue in the arthouse film. The films relates the story of a group of young Maasai warriors, Lomotoon and Merono sent on a mission to travel through the entirety of Kenya on foot, hunting a mythical lion responsible for bringing about a major drought, and by doing so bringing back the rain.

The film brought the rural Kenyan landscape to the silver screen and innovatively incorporated traditional Maasai song with a symphony orchestra. It was developed in partnership with the Maasai community, and actual tradition and legends were used as a basis for the story and used tribesmen from the Loita Hills area with no former acting experience.

The film Togetherness Supreme was shot in 2009–2010 entirely in collaboration with the youth of Kibera. It is a story based on the events of the 2007 disputed Presidential election in Kenya. It is the story of Kamau, an artist, who thirsts for change. He uses his art to bring about change, but is soon caught up in the events leading to the post election violence of 2007/8.

The 1985 film, Out of Africa starring Meryl Streep and Robert Redford was shot in Kenya and revealed Kenya's colonial history in romantic drama film. It retold the story of Danish author's Karen Blixen's love affair with Kenya and Hunter Denys Finch Hatton in particular. In 1999, the Canadian-produced film was shot in Kenya, To Walk with Lions.

The 2012 film Nairobi Half Life was selected as the Kenyan entry for the Best Foreign Language Film at the 85th Academy Awards, but it was not nominated. It was the first time Kenya submitted a film to the category. The film was received with critical acclaim, and has won five awards to date: Best Picture at the Kenyan 2012 Kalasha Film Awards, Best Actor at the Durban International Film Festival, Breakthrough Audience Award at the AFI Fest and audience awards at two different film festivals: the Film Africa Festival London and the Festival di cinema africano di Verona.
