= Hot Sun Films =

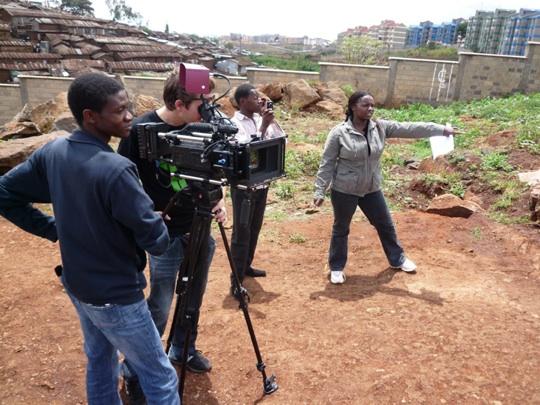
Shooting feature film Togetherness Supreme in collaboration with Kibera youth trainees

HOT SUN FILMS, is a film/video production and training company based in East Africa. It was founded by Nathan Collett. Hot Sun Films' work focuses on bring out a realistic, challenging and positive image of those on the very margins of society. It works to develop and expose the talents and possibilities of the youth of the urban slums of Africa. One of its projects is the non - profit organization Hot Sun Foundation.

Hot Sun Films' most noted film project to date is Kibera Kid. It has also produced The Oath.

In April 2009, Hot Sun Films' first feature film was shot. The feature film is entitled Togetherness Supreme, working title, the film focuses on tribal tension and the possibility of reconciliation in Kibera, East Africa's largest slum. As of June 2009, Togetherness Supreme is being edited using trainees from Kibera through Hot Sun Foundation. Hot Sun Films is unique in that it often uses non-professional actors from the urban slums of Africa to make its films and to tell stories that have not been previously seen on screen.

In August 2009, Hot Sun Films and Hot Sun Foundation started the Kibera Film School, a one of a kind film school based in Kibera that trains youth from the slum in scriptwriting, camera work, editing, directing and producing.
