= Adulterers (film) =

- DVD cover
- Directed by: H. M. Coakley
- Written by: H. M. Coakley
- Story by: H. M. Coakley
- Produced by: H. M. Coakley; Mark E. Walker
- Starring: Sean Faris; Mehcad Brooks; Danielle Savre
- Cinematography: Ben Kufrin
- Edited by: Brody Gusar; Chris Conlee
- Music by: Christopher Cano
- Production companies: H. M. Coakley Entertainment Production; Infinite X7 Productions; Datari Turner Productions
- Release date: 2015
- Running time: 91 minutes
- Country: United States
- Language: English

Adulterers is a 2015 American independent drama film written and directed by H. M. Coakley. It stars Sean Faris, Mehcad Brooks and Danielle Savre in the lead roles.

== Plot ==
During a hot day in New Orleans, after his work at a hardware store, Samuel returns home with a box of chocolates and a bouquet of flowers for his wife Ashley for their wedding anniversary. However, he finds her cheating on him with Damien. He holds them captive at gunpoint, while he decides their fate.

At first, Samuel thinks about shooting both of them, but then he finds himself reliving the events in his mind. Instead of shooting them, he forces Ashley and Damien to reveal their personal lives and sexual encounters. Samuel learns that Damien has a wife, Jasmine, who is three months pregnant, and that Ashley's abusive ex-boyfriend was actually her ex-husband (it is not clear if Ashley is bigamous). Samuel asks Damien to call Jasmine, using the sex speaker so that everyone can hear the conversation, and to tell her what he has done with Ashley. Jasmine reveals that Damien has cheated on her many times in the past. Devastated, Jasmine is asked by Samuel to decide the fate of Damien: either Samuel shoots him, or he lets him go home. He suggests that Jasmine come and confront Damien in person and have sex with Samuel to show him what it feels like to be cheated on.

Samuel finds himself later in reality, where it is revealed that he murdered Ashley and Damien and buried their bodies under the massif of roses in the backyard of his and Ashley's home.

== Cast ==
- Sean Faris as Samuel
- Mehcad Brooks as Damien
- Danielle Savre as Ashley
- Stephanie Charles as Lola
- Steffinnie Phrommany as Jasmine
- Phillip Brock as Jimmy
- Robert Eric Wise as Tyrone
- Rebecca Reaney as Flight Attendant

== Critical reception ==
CaribPress gave the film a positive review, and wrote, "A mind twister of a film, Adulterers is taut and thoroughly engaging and raises the adage: what would you do if you caught your loved one cheating?". Conversely, Shockya rated it negatively in its review of the film, calling it "not a good movie", saying that "the editing is bizarre, the characters are stupid and unlikeable, and the narration is all over the place."
