= Female Filmmakers in Kenya (FEFKA) =

Female Filmmakers in Kenya Association
- Abbreviation: FEFKA
- Formation: 2022
- Founder: Sarah Owendi Ayitso
- Type: Professional association
- Purpose: Filmmaking, Gender Equality, Professional Development, Health Advocacy
- Headquarters: Nairobi, Kenya
- Region served: Kenya
- President: Sarah Owendi Ayitso

The Female Filmmakers in Kenya Association (FEFKA) is a national professional association dedicated to supporting women in the Kenyan film industry. Founded in 2022, the organization focuses on advancing gender equity, professional growth, and sustainability for female creatives through mental health support, legal aid, and capacity building.

== History ==
FEFKA was established in 2022 by producer Sarah Owendi Ayitso. Ayitso founded the association to address systemic challenges faced by women in the Kenyan film sector, aiming to create a centralized platform for advocacy and professional support.

== Initiatives ==
=== Healthcare and Welfare ===
In October 2025, FEFKA entered into a partnership with Britam Insurance to provide affordable medical insurance for its members. The initiative, which became operational in January 2026, was designed to provide a social safety net for freelance female filmmakers who often lack consistent medical coverage.

=== Legal and Psychosocial Support ===
The association collaborates with the Federation of Women Lawyers (FIDA) to offer legal aid and psychosocial services to its members. These programs address industry-specific needs, including contract disputes and workplace harassment.

== Notable figures ==
=== Sarah Owendi Ayitso ===
Sarah Owendi Ayitso is the founder and current president of FEFKA. She is a television and documentary producer and the executive producer at Phoenix 7 Pictures. In 2025, she served as a Global Artist residing at the University of Michigan, where her work Dark Side of Glory was screened at the African Women Film Festival.

Selected Filmography:

- Death in the Heartlands (2021) – Investigative documentary (Field Producer)
- A Merry X-Mess (2023) — Feature film (Showmax)
- Lady of the Rings (Upcoming) – Documentary on gender-based violence

Awards:

- Best Producer – Documentary, Women in Film Awards Kenya (2023)

== See also ==
- Cinema of Kenya
- Women's cinema
