= Subira (2007 film) =

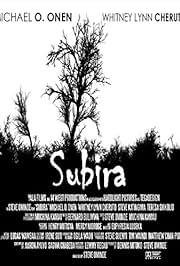
- Film Poster
- Directed by: Ravneet "Sippy" Chadha
- Screenplay by: Ravneet "Sippy" Chadha
- Produced by: Ravneet "Sippy" Chadha
- Starring: Saada Mohammed; Mwanatum Ahmed; Aisha Mohammed; Babu Hussein
- Cinematography: Nathan Collett
- Edited by: Wanjugu Ndirangu; Philip Murungi
- Music by: Baladna of Zanzíbar; DCMA; Salmaan Ahmed
- Production company: Kaaya Films
- Distributed by: Hot Sun Films
- Release date: 2007
- Running time: 12 mins
- Country: Kenya
- Language: Swahili

Subira is a 2007 Kenyan film recorded on the shores of Lamu Island. Subira is an 11-year-old rebellious Muslim girl whose life turns upside down when she reaches adulthood and is forced to wear a hijab, she expects to follow the same rules as her older brother. This intense family drama brilliantly illustrates the dichotomy between modernity and tradition.

== Plot ==
Raised in an orthodox Muslim village on the isolated island of Lamu, Kenya, Her controlling mother expects her to follow tradition, do household tasks, and strive to be a decent bride, just like everyone else. Subira, however, has different intentions. She wants to live by her own rules, regardless of what others say.

== Cast ==
- Saada Mohammed
- Aisha Mohammed
- Babu Hussein
- Mwanatum Ahmed

== Awards ==
- Kenya IFF 2007
- Amakula IFF 2008
- Cannes 2008
- Zanzibar IFF 2008
- Lola Kenya Children's Screen 2008
- Amiens International Film Festival 2008
