= Mary Beth Fielder =

American film producer

Mary Beth Fielder is an American writer, director and producer of television and feature films. She served on the faculty of the University of Southern California School of Cinematic Arts from 1994 to 2009.

== Biography ==
Fielder began her academic career at the University of Pennsylvania, where she graduated magna cum laude with a degree in fine arts. She subsequently moved to New York City and studied acting at the Neighborhood Playhouse School of the Theater under Sanford Meisner. After three years working in New York theater, she was accepted to the Master of Fine Arts Program in Film Production at the University of Southern California (USC) School of Cinematic Arts. In the following years, Fielder wrote several scripts for studios such as Universal Pictures, 20th Century Fox and Warner Bros. She also directed thirtysomething for ABC television and a number of other series.

In 1994, Fielder returned to USC as a full-time faculty member, teaching film directing, screenwriting and acting and serving as the faculty mentor on over 100 student films. She was awarded the Mellon Award for Excellence in Mentoring in 2007 for mentoring undergraduate students and again in 2009 for mentoring graduate students.

Fielder has also worked with the Jewish Federation's Tel Aviv/Los Angeles Partnership Program, teaching and writing the curriculum for a Cinema Master Class and coordinating a summer exchange program between Tel Aviv University and USC. In March 2008 she received a U.S. Speakers and Specialists grant to conduct a series of scriptwriting workshops and career mentoring workshops in Nairobi, Kenya. The workshops took place in Kibera, where she taught scriptwriting to fifty students for the Hot Sun Foundation.

Fielder co-wrote and produced two feature films. Wild About Harry (2009) tells the story of a teenage girl who discovers a shocking secret about her recently widowed father. The film was awarded "Best of Fest" at the Palm Springs International Film Festival, and the filmmakers also received a special award from the City of Palm Springs for their efforts in fighting homophobia. Togetherness Supreme (2010) is the first feature film shot entirely in Kibera, Kenya, and tells a story of intertribal conflict and reconciliation set against the backdrop of the contested presidential election in 2007. The film won two awards at the 2010 Africa Movie Academy Awards, and in February 2011 won Best International Feature Film Award at the 26th Santa Barbara International Film Festival.

Fielder is a member of the Writers Guild of America, the Directors Guild of America, and the Screen Actors Guild.
