= Brad Bird filmography =

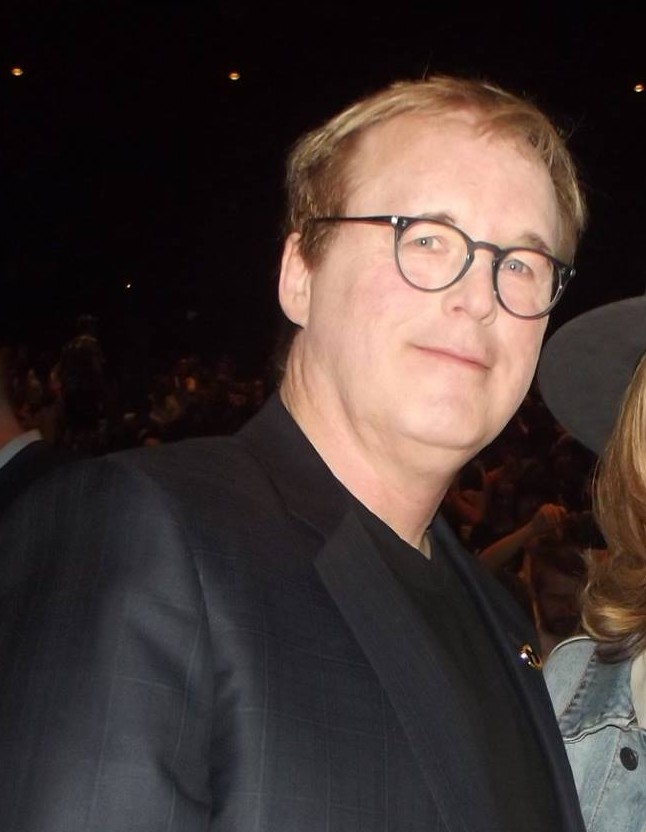
Brad Bird in 2018

Brad Bird is a filmmaker, animator, and voice actor. He has had a career spanning over four decades in both television, animation and live-action films.

In the 1980s Bird co-wrote Batteries Not Included (1987), and developed two episodes of Amazing Stories for Steven Spielberg. Afterwards, Bird joined the animated sitcom The Simpsons as creative consultant for eight seasons.

Bird directed his first animated film The Iron Giant (1999), before moving to Pixar, where he wrote and directed three successful animated films, The Incredibles (2004), Ratatouille (2007), and Incredibles 2 (2018). He transitioned to live-action filmmaking with Mission: Impossible – Ghost Protocol (2011) and Disney's Tomorrowland (2015). He would move to Skydance Animation, where he wrote and directed the animated film Ray Gunn (2026).

== Feature film ==
Year	Title	Director	Writer	Producer	Notes
1987	Batteries Not Included	No	Yes	No	
1999	The Iron Giant	Yes	Yes (Note: Although Tim McCanlies received sole screenplay credit in the original theatrical prints and home video releases, Bird is credited in the film's 2015 restoration and the Signature Edition.)	No	Also uncredited animator and song performer: "Duck and Cover"
2004	The Incredibles	Yes	Yes	No	
2007	Ratatouille	Yes	Yes	No	
2011	Mission: Impossible – Ghost Protocol	Yes	No	No	
2015	Tomorrowland	Yes	Yes	Yes	Also logos designer
2018	Incredibles 2	Yes	Yes	No	Also song lyrics: "Frozone"
2026	Ray Gunn	Yes	Yes	Yes	
2028	Incredibles 3	No	Yes	Yes (Note: Pixar Chief Creative Officer Pete Docter announced Brad Bird as executive producer of Incredibles 3 at an upcoming animation films presentation in June 2025. However, subsequent reports from the Walt Disney Company following the 2026 D23 Expo name Bird as another producer alongside Dana Murray without any executive classification.)	

Animator only

- Animalympics (1980)
- The Fox and the Hound (1981) (Uncredited)
- The Plague Dogs (1982)
- The Black Cauldron (1985) (Uncredited)
- The Brave Little Toaster (1987) (Uncredited)
- Little Nemo: Adventures in Slumberland (1989) (Uncredited)

Voice roles

Year	Title	Role
2004	The Incredibles	Edna Mode (E)
2007	Ratatouille	Ambrister Minion
2015	Jurassic World	Monorail Announcer
2018	Incredibles 2	Edna Mode (E)/Additional voices
2026	Ray Gunn	Gunsol/Musker

Documentary appearances

- Fog City Mavericks (2007)
- The Pixar Story (2007)
- A Grand Night In: The Story of Aardman (2015)
- The Giant's Dream: The Making of The Iron Giant (2016)

Pixar Senior Creative Team

- WALL-E (2008)
- Up (2009)
- Toy Story 3 (2010)
- Cars 2 (2011)
- Brave (2012)
- Monsters University (2013)
- Inside Out (2015)
- The Good Dinosaur (2015)
- Finding Dory (2016)
- Cars 3 (2017)
- Coco (2017)
- Incredibles 2 (2018)
- Toy Story 4 (2019)

Uncredited brain trust

- Monsters, Inc. (2001)
- Finding Nemo (2003)
- The Incredibles (2004)
- Cars (2006)
- Ratatouille (2007)

Special thanks

- Captain EO (1986)
- An American Tail (1986)
- Technological Threat (1988)
- Who Framed Roger Rabbit (1988)
- All Dogs Go to Heaven (1989)
- Thumbelina (1994)
- Balto (1995)
- Ice Age (2002)
- The SpongeBob SquarePants Movie (2004)
- Corpse Bride (2005)
- Friz on Film (2006)
- Fog City Mavericks (2007)
- Madison's Résumé (2007)
- The Pixar Story (2007)
- Calendar Confloption (2009)
- Partly Cloudy (2009)
- Day & Night (2010)
- Pinched (2010)
- Toy Story of Terror! (2013)
- Jurassic World (2015)
- The Angry Birds Movie (2016)
- Bao (2018)
- Frozen II (2019)
- Canvas (2020)
- Pixar Popcorn: Chore Day The Incredibles Way (2021)
- Pixar Popcorn: Cookie Num Num (2021)
- Lightyear (2022)
- Werewolf by Night (2022)
- Good Chemistry: The Story of Elemental (2023)

== Short film ==
Year	Title	Director	Writer	Executive Producer	Other	Voice Role	Notes
1979	Doctor of Doom	No	No	No	Yes	Don Carlo, Bystander	
2005	Jack-Jack Attack	Yes	Yes	No	No		
2005	Mr. Incredible and Pals	Commentary	Commentary	Yes	No		Writer/director of commentary dialogue
2005	One Man Band	No	No	Yes	No		
2007	Your Friend the Rat	No	No	Yes	No		
2018	Auntie Edna	No	No	Yes	Yes	Edna Mode (E)	

== Television ==
Year	Title	Director	Writer	Episode(s)
1985–1987	Amazing Stories	Yes	Yes	"The Main Attraction" (Writer) "Family Dog" (Director, writer and animation producer)
1989–1998	The Simpsons	Yes	No	Also executive consultant for 180 episodes "Krusty Gets Busted" (Director) "Like Father, Like Clown" (Creator and director)
1993	Family Dog	No	Creator	

Other credits

Year	Title	Role	Notes
1990	Rugrats	Animator	Episode "Tommy Pickles and The Great White Thing"
1994–1995	The Critic	Executive consultant	
1997	King of the Hill	Creative consultant and visual consultant	

== Unmade projects ==
- Brothers in Crime, an action comedy for New Line Cinema that was set to be Bird's directorial and live action feature debut.
- The Spirit, an animated feature based on the comic Bird developed with Jerry Rees and producer Gary Kurtz, based on Will Eisner's acclaimed comic strip. The studios they pitched it to liked the script, but were unwilling to take the gamble on an animated feature for the adult audience. Bird was then replaced by various directors, but ultimately replaced by veteran comic-book writer Frank Miller and was released on Christmas 2008 to critical and commercial negative reviews.
- The Incredible Mr. Limpet, a project that is still in development hell. Bird was attached to direct at one point but was replaced by Mike Judge and many others.
- Curious George, wrote a draft of the film at one point, but his script was not used in the produced version.
- The Simpsons Movie, the crew from The Simpsons including James L. Brooks and Matt Groening were hoping to get Bird to direct, but was too busy with The Incredibles and Ratatouille at the time. David Silverman, who was also working at Pixar at the time and quit his job after finishing work on Monsters, Inc., became the film's director.
- 1906, a collaborative project from Warner Bros. Pictures and Pixar (which could have been the latter's first live-action project), in association with Walt Disney Pictures, where Bird would have directed. Disney and Pixar left the project in 2012 in development limbo at Warner Bros. due to delays in the film's several planned releases, several rejected scripts were not picked up, and going over budget ($200 million). However as of July 2026, Bird has expressed interest in adapting the book as an eight-episode miniseries.
- Star Wars: The Force Awakens, Bird was on a shortlist of directors to direct the seventh Star Wars film. He passed on the project in favor of Tomorrowland; The Force Awakens was directed by J. J. Abrams.
- Sonic the Hedgehog, Bird was featured on a shortlist of writers when the film was still in development at Columbia Pictures. After Jeff Fowler was chosen to direct, Pat Casey and Josh Miller were picked as writers.
- Untitled musical film, Bird announced in 2019 he was developing an original musical that would include songs by frequent collaborator Michael Giacchino and contain about 20 minutes of animation.
- Incredibles 3, Bird was asked to direct Incredibles 3, though he would be replaced by Peter Sohn due to Bird's commitment to the film Ray Gunn (2026). Nevertheless, Bird would remain involved as a screenwriter and executive producer.

== Other venues ==
Music video

Year	Title	Director	Storyboard Artist
1990	"Do the Bartman"	Yes	Yes

Video game voice roles

Year	Title	Role
2004	The Incredibles	Edna Mode (E)
2004	The Incredibles: When Danger Calls	Edna Mode (E)
2018	Lego The Incredibles	Edna Mode (E)

Theme park

Year	Title	Role	Notes
2018	Incredicoaster	Edna Mode (E)	Voice
