= Wild About Harry (2009 film) =

- Directed by: Gwen Wynne
- Written by: Mary Beth Fielder; Gwen Wynne
- Produced by: Suzan Crowley; Kimberly Culotta; James Egan; Mary Beth Fielder; Cynthia Harrington; Pamela Tom; Jenny Jules; Adam W. Rosen; Nathan Russell; Gwen Wynne
- Starring: Tate Donovan; Adam Pascal; Danielle Savre; Skye McCole Bartusiak; Josh Peck; Corey Sevier; Susan Anspach; James Sikking; Fernando Colunga; Daniela Castro; Francisco Gattorno; César Évora; Anne Ramsay; Stacey Dash
- Cinematography: Chris Chomyn
- Edited by: Joanne D'Antonio
- Music by: Alice Wood
- Production companies: Avery Productions; Cape Cod Films; Firebrand Entertainment; Wild at Heart Films
- Distributed by: Freestyle Releasing
- Release dates: January 2009 (Palm Springs International Film Festival); December 2014 (United States)
- Running time: 96 minutes
- Country: United States
- Language: English

Wild About Harry, also known as American Primitive, is a 2009 American family drama film directed by Gwen Wynne and starring Tate Donovan, Adam Pascal, Danielle Savre, Skye McCole Bartusiak, Josh Peck, Corey Sevier, Susan Anspach, Fernando Colunga, James Sikking, Daniela Castro and Stacey Dash. It was written by Gwen Wynne and Mary Beth Fielder. The film had the original title American Primitive and a script titled Once in a Very Blue Moon.

== Premise ==
Teenaged sisters Madeline and Daisy, living on Cape Cod, deal with the implications of their widower father Harry coming out in 1973.

== Cast ==
- Tate Donovan as Harry Goodhart
- Adam Pascal as Theodore Gibbs
- Danielle Savre as Madeline Goodhart
- Skye McCole Bartusiak as Daisy Goodhart
- Josh Peck as Spoke White
- Corey Sevier as Sam Brown
- Susan Anspach as Martha
- Fernando Colunga as Danny Walker
- César Évora as Ricardo
- Francisco Gattorno as Jose
- Daniela Castro as Debbie
- James Sikking as William Cauldicott
- Anne Ramsay as Katrina Brown
- Stacey Dash as Joy Crowley
- Johanna Braddy as Lucy Carmichael
- Jordan-Claire Green as Bridget
- Blythe Auffarth as Eliza
- Suzan Crowley as Gertie
- John Savage as Horace White
- Paul Sass as Mr. Brown
- Kristina Klebe as Eliza Cauldicott
- Jason Stuart as Randolph
- Helen Carey as Mrs. Yates
- Suzan Crowley as Gertie
- John Franchi as Dancer
- Geno Monteiro as Michael
- Lili Barsha as Tiger Lady
- Veronica Blake as Heidi Lotito
- Victor Warren as Marcus Brown

== Reception ==
Tom Gregory of The Huffington Post wrote, "American Primitive is the “why” that drove early activists like Harvey Milk and the Stonewall demonstrators to demand equality. It's a film about the struggle to redefine a peaceful, safe home against hatred, misunderstanding, and family law at the time when homosexuality was classified as mental illness. Set in 1973, this indie gem personalizes the mistrust, alienation, and prejudice that same-sex families still fight against today." Like Tom Gregory, Quiet Earth wrote "the acting was top notch", and praised the performance of Josh Peck. They wrote the film had fantastic "beginning feeling and production style", and spoke well of the film's theme and storyline. 'Seattle Gay News praised the film, writing "I love that this Queer love story is told through the eyes of Madeline. It's an unusual way into a Queer story and one that provides interesting insights from a fresh perspective. American Primitive is a nicely turned out little film that I highly recommend".
