= Mehcad Brooks =

American actor and model (born 1980)

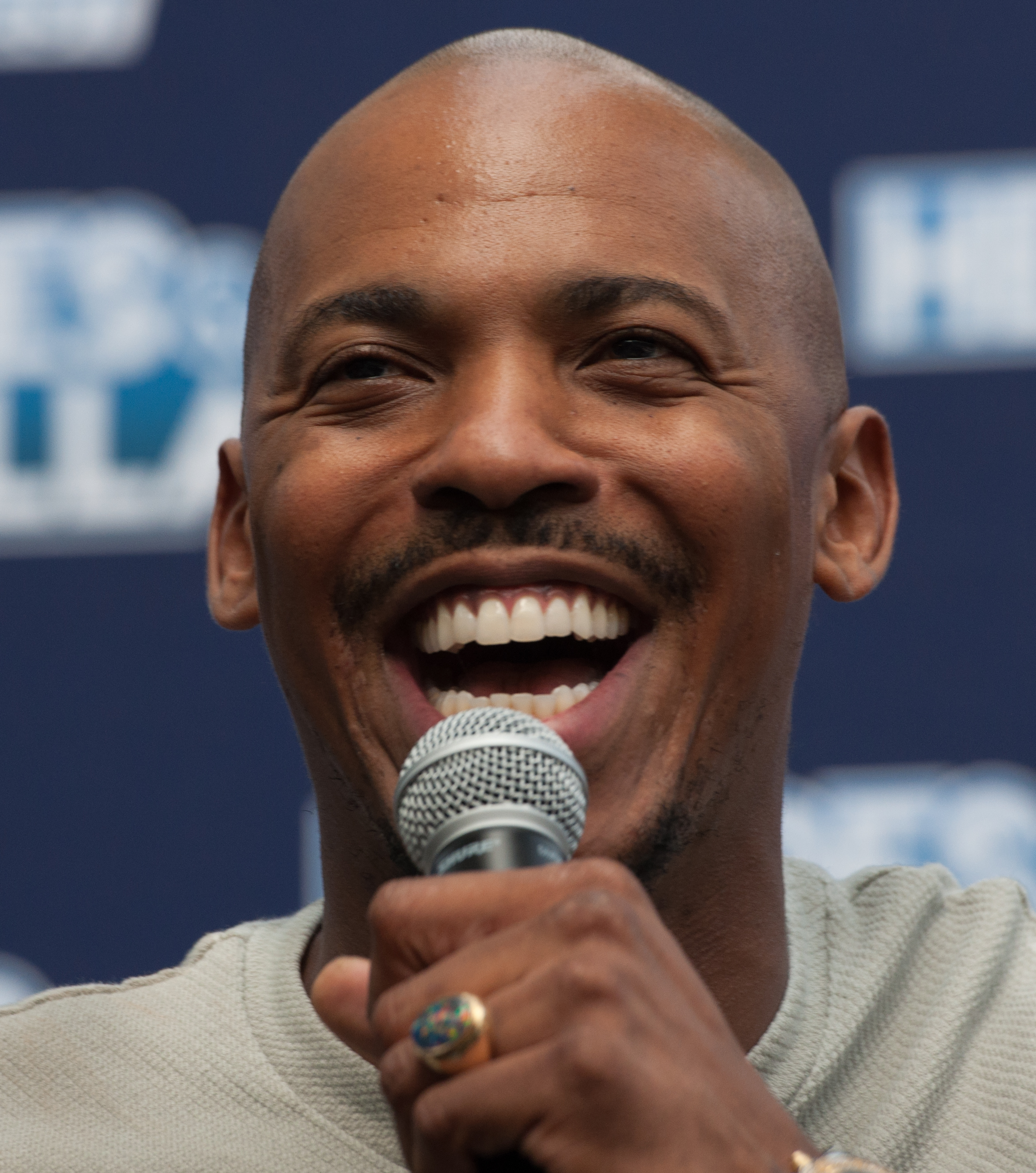
- Brooks at London Fan Fest 2017
- Born: Mehcad Jason McKinley Brooks; October 25, 1980 (age 45); Austin, Texas, U.S.
- Education: University of Southern California
- Occupation: Actor
- Years active: 2002–present
- Father: Billy Brooks

Mehcad Jason McKinley Brooks (born October 25, 1980) is an American actor and former fashion model. He is known for his roles as Matthew Applewhite in the second season of ABC's series Desperate Housewives (2005–2006), Jerome in The Game, "Eggs" Benedict Talley in the first and second seasons of HBO's series True Blood, his leading role as Terrance "TK" King in the USA series Necessary Roughness (2011–2013) and James Olsen in the CBS/The CW series Supergirl. From 2022 to 2025, he portrayed one of the lead roles, that of NYPD Detective Jalen Shaw, on the NBC police procedural drama Law & Order.

== Early life and education ==
Brooks was born and raised in Austin, Texas, where he attended L.C. Anderson High School. Brooks is the son of Austin American-Statesman editorial writer Alberta Phillips and former pro football player Billy Brooks; his stepfather is lawyer Gary Bledsoe. After graduating from high school in 1999, he attended the University of Southern California's School of Cinema-Television. He then left to pursue an acting career.

== Career ==
Brooks' early work includes being a Calvin Klein underwear model.

In 2004, Brooks played a high school basketball player who was killed by a teammate's father on the series Cold Case (season 1, episode 17). From 2005 to 2006, Brooks played the role of Matthew Applewhite on the ABC TV drama Desperate Housewives. He appeared in Glory Road, portraying Harry Flournoy, an athlete at Texas Western University when the five starting black players beat Kentucky for the national championship. He acted in the 2007 film In the Valley of Elah. He starred opposite Tia Mowry as her boyfriend, Jerome, on the TV series The Game in 2008. In 2009, he appeared on FOX's TV series Dollhouse. Brooks played Benedict "Eggs" Talley in the second season of HBO's True Blood. Beginning January 2010, he appeared as attorney Malcolm Bennet in the now-canceled ABC series The Deep End. He plays the "new boyfriend" in a recent State Farm Insurance television commercial alongside former The Game co-star Gabrielle Dennis.

Brooks appeared in the ABC documentary-style dramedy television series My Generation, which premiered in Fall 2010. The show was canceled after only two episodes. He was among the cast on the USA Network series Necessary Roughness which debuted on June 29, 2011. The show featured Brooks as Terrence "TK" King, a football player for the New York Hawks whose anger issues cause his team to require him to see a therapist. In 2013, Necessary Roughness was cancelled. Brooks guest starred in the Law & Order: Special Victims Unit episode as Prince Miller, a basketball superstar who was molested as a child by his coach, and a guest role on J. J. Abrams' show Alcatraz as a bomb disposal expert. In 2013, Brooks was featured in a public service announcement for the Center for Reproductive Rights.

From the series premiere until his departure in the fourth episode of the fifth season, Brooks played James Olsen on the CBS/The CW drama Supergirl as a series regular.

On October 20, 2017, he released his debut single, "Tears Away".

In 2019, he was announced to portray Jax Briggs for the Mortal Kombat reboot released on April 23, 2021.

In June 2022, it was announced that Brooks would be joining the cast of the long-running crime series Law & Order as Detective Jalen Shaw in season 22.

== In the media ==
He appeared in the July 2010 issue of GQ, alongside Emanuela de Paula.

== Personal life ==
He is the son of former NFL wide receiver Billy Brooks.

Brooks has stated in an interview with IGN that he is an avid player of video games, including the Call of Duty, Medal of Honor, and Madden series.

His older twin brother, Billy Brooks IV, was a regular on the now defunct Spill.com and currently guests on its successor Double Toasted.

He was in a relationship with Creature co-star Serinda Swan until their break up in 2011.

== Filmography ==
=== Films ===
Year	Title	Role	Notes
2002	Radimi: Who Stole the Dream	Radimi Wadkins	
2003	A Token for Your Thoughts	The Jock	Short
2006	Glory Road	Harry Flournoy	
2007	In the Valley of Elah	Spc. Ennis Long	
2008	Fly Like Mercury	Hutch	
2010	Just Wright	Angelo Bembrey	
2011	Creature	Niles	
2012	Magic: The Gathering - The Musical	Doug	Short
2014	About Last Night	Derek	
2015	Adulterers	Damien	
2018	Nobody's Fool	Charlie	
2020	A Fall from Grace	Shannon Delong/Maurice Mills	
2021	Mortal Kombat	Jackson "Jax" Briggs	
2026	Mortal Kombat II	Jackson "Jax" Briggs	

=== Television ===
Year	Title	Role	Notes
2002	Do Over	Shawn Hodges	Episode: "Take Me Out of the Ball Game"
2002	Malcolm in the Middle	Big Kid	Episode: "Stupid Girl"
2003	Boston Public	Russell Clark	Recurring cast: season 3
2003	One on One	Mustafa	Episode: "2 Young, 2 Curious"
2004	Cold Case	Herman Lester	Episode: "The Lost Soul of Herman Lester"
2004	Tiger Cruise	Kenny	TV movie
2005–2006	Desperate Housewives	Matthew Applewhite	Guest: season 1, main cast: season 2
2006	Ghost Whisperer	Justin Cotter	Episode: "Giving Up the Ghost"
2007–2008	K-Ville	Vin Bear	Episode: "Critical Mass" & "Game Night"
2008	The Game	Jerome "Jerry" Wright	Recurring cast: seasons 2–3
2008–2010	True Blood	Benedict "Eggs" Talley	Recurring cast: seasons 1–2, guest: season 3
2009	Dollhouse	Sam Jennings	Episode: "Echoes"
2010	The Deep End	Malcolm Bennett	6 episodes
2010	My Generation	Rolly Marks	Main cast
2011	Law & Order: Special Victims Unit	Prince Miller	Episode: "Personal Fouls"
2011	Alcatraz	Matt Tanner	Episode: "Paxton Petty"
2011–2013	Necessary Roughness	Terrence King	38 episodes
2014	Benched	George Grumbeigh Jr.	Episode: "Shark, Actually"
2015–2021	Supergirl	James Olsen / Guardian	Main cast: seasons 1–5, guest: season 6
2022	Law & Order: Organized Crime	Det. Jalen Shaw	Guest
2022	Law & Order: Special Victims Unit	Det. Jalen Shaw	Guest
2022–2025	Law & Order	Det. Jalen Shaw	Main role
2025	And Just Like That	Marion Odin	Recurring role

== Discography ==
=== Albums ===
Title	Album details		
Title	Album details	May 20TH	Released: July 13, 2018; Label: OurMovement Records; Format: digital download, streaming

=== Singles ===
Title	Year		
Title	Year	"Tears Away"	2017
"Stars"	2018		
"Living Proof"	2018		
"Night Owls"	2018		
"Nothing to Lose"	2018		
"Arrested"	2018		
"Kepu"	2018		
"Train"	2018		
"Ego Talking"	2018		
"Coupe Windows"	2018		
"Oceans"	2019		
"Early Morning Under a Lilac Sky"	2020		

== Awards and nominations ==
Year	Award	Category	TV Show	Result
2006	Image Awards	Outstanding Supporting Actor in a Comedy Series	Desperate Housewives	Nominated
2006	Screen Actors Guild Awards	Outstanding Performance by an Ensemble in a Comedy Series	Desperate Housewives	Won
2007	Screen Actors Guild Awards	Outstanding Performance by an Ensemble in a Comedy Series	Desperate Housewives	Nominated
2010	Screen Actors Guild Awards	Outstanding Performance by an Ensemble in a Drama Series	True Blood	Nominated
2017	Saturn Awards	Best Supporting Actor on a Television Series	Supergirl	Nominated

== See also ==
- List of male underwear models
