= Danielle Savre =

American actress (born 1988)

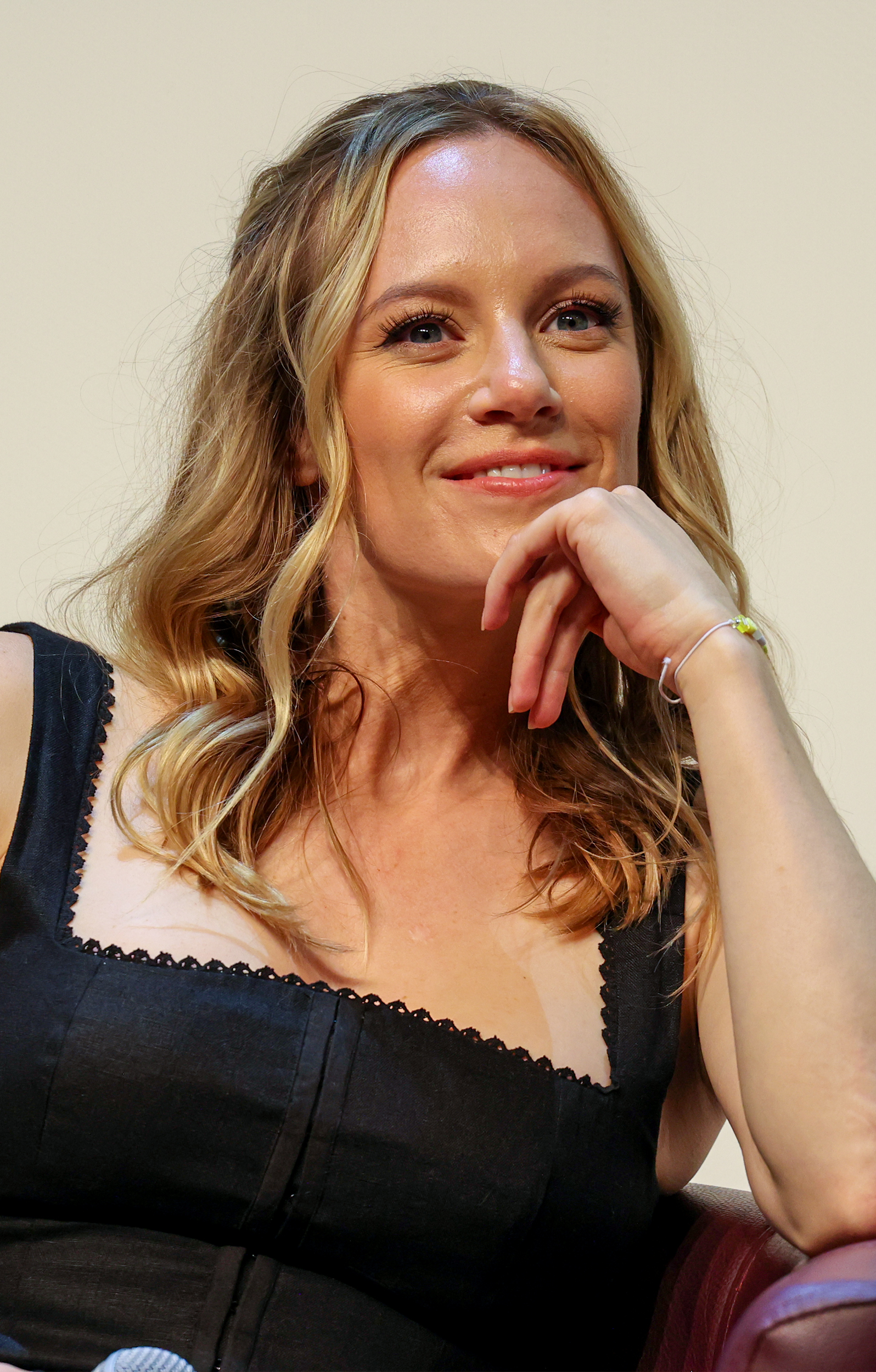
- Savre in 2022
- Born: August 26, 1988 (age 38)
- Occupations: Actress, director
- Years active: 2001–present
- Partner: Kevin McKidd (2023–present)
- Website: www.dsavre.com

Danielle Savre (born August 26, 1988) is an American actress. She is known for her television roles, such as her lead performances in the 2007 MTV music drama Kaya, the 2016 TLC drama Too Close to Home, and the ABC Grey's Anatomy spin-off Station 19, and for her roles in the films Wild About Harry and Boogeyman 2.

== Career ==
In 2006, Savre was cast in the straight-to-DVD film Bring It On: All or Nothing. In 2007, she was cast in the 2009 drama film Wild About Harry (originally titled American Primitive) playing the part of Madeline, a 1970s teenager who comes to realize that her father is gay. The same year, Savre was cast as the titular rock star character on the MTV series Kaya which ran for one season. She also starred in the 2007 horror film Boogeyman 2 playing the lead role of Laura Potter.

Savre has made guest appearances in several television shows like The X-Files, CSI: Crime Scene Investigation and Charmed. She had recurring roles in the television show Summerland as Callie, and the NBC series Heroes as Jackie Wilcox. However, in Heroes, her character is killed in the ninth episode "Homecoming" of the first season, though she reappears thrice more: once retrospectively in "Six Months Ago", and twice during the fourth season, in "Once Upon a Time in Texas" and "Pass/Fail".

In 2014, Savre was cast as the cheating wife in the 2015 thriller film Adulterers (also known as Avouterie). The same year, she was cast as "Margo, the acting head of the leading shapeshifting family" in the Supernatural spin-off series Supernatural: Bloodlines which ultimately was not ordered to series. In 2016, Savre was cast as lead character Anna in the Tyler Perry drama series Too Close to Home.

In 2018, Savre was cast as a main character, the bisexual firefighter Maya Bishop, on the Grey's Anatomy spin-off drama series Station 19. In 2023, she directed the sixteenth episode of the sixth season of Station 19, entitled "Dirty Laundry". In 2021, Savre directed the short film Heard.

In 2025, Savre was cast in the recurring role of Heather Tollin/Lena Evans on the NBC American procedural drama Found.

== Personal life ==
In 2021, Savre donated her eggs to her childhood friend Chris Ogden-Harkins so he could start a family with his husband.

== Filmography ==
=== Film ===
Year	Title	Role	Notes
2006	Bring It On: All or Nothing	Brianna	Direct-to-video film
2007	In the Land of Women	Teenage Girl	
2007	The Final Season	Cindy Iverson	
2007	Boogeyman 2	Laura Porter	
2009	Wild About Harry	Madeline Goodhart	
2014	Jarhead 2: Field of Fire	Danielle 'Danni' Allen	Direct-to-video film
2015	Wild for the Night	Det. Lewis	
2015	Adulterers	Ashley	originally titled Avouterie
2018	Deep Blue Sea 2	Dr. Misty Calhoun	Direct-to-video film

=== Television ===
Year	Title	Role	Notes
2001	Murphy's Dozen	Cassidy	Television film
2001	One on One	Brittany	Episode: "School Dazed"
2002	The X-Files	Marcia Brady	Episode: "Sunshine Days"
2002	Grounded for Life	Hannah	Episodes: "The Kids Are Alright", "Oops!... I Did It Again"
2004	Grounded for Life	Courtney	Episodes: "All Apologies", "The Cheat Is On"
2004	CSI: Crime Scene Investigation	Amy Keaton	Episode: "Swap Meet"
2004–2005	Summerland	Callie	Recurring role
2005	Charmed	New Phoebe	Episode: "Something Wicca This Way Goes"
2005	The Closer	Gretchen Schiller	Episode: "Flashpoint"
2006	You've Reached the Elliotts	Amanda Elliott	Television film
2006	Malcolm in the Middle	Heidi	Episode: "Lois Strikes Back"
2006	Close to Home	Amanda Roth	Episode: "Hot Grrrl"
2006–2010	Heroes	Jackie Wilcox	Recurring role
2007	Kaya	Kaya	Lead role
2008	Generation Gap	Jenny	Television film
2009	CSI: Miami	Ashley Tanner	Episode: "Bone Voyage"
2010	Outlaw	Lori Farwell	Episode: "In Re: Curtis Farwell"
2011	The Glades	Jolene	Episode: "Breakout"
2012	Drew Peterson: Untouchable	Chloe Roberts	Television film
2012	Hollywood Heights	Lia	Recurring role
2014	Supernatural	Margo Lassiter	Episode: "Bloodlines"
2015	Perception	Reagan Harper	Episode: "Meat"
2016	The Wrong Car	Trudy O'Donnell	Television film; television title: A Vehicle for Revenge
2016	Blue Bloods	Emily Harrison	Episodes: "The Price of Justice", "Personal Business"
2016	The Perfect Stalker	Grace Winston	Television film
2016–2017	Too Close to Home	Anna Hayes	Main role
2016–2017	T@gged	Ms. Dawson	Web series; recurring role (seasons 1–2)
2017	Happily Never After	Kate	Television film
2018–2024	Station 19	Maya DeLuca-Bishop	Main role; 105 episodes / also director; 1 episode
2020–2021, 2023, 2026	Grey's Anatomy	Maya DeLuca-Bishop	Recurring role (season 16-17); Guest role (season 19, 22); 6 episodes
2025	Found	Heather Tollin / Lena Evans	Recurring role (season 2; 6 episodes)
