= Lola Kenya Children's Screen =

Kenyan audiovisual media festival

Lola Kenya Screen, or Lola Kenya Children's Screen is an audio-visual media festival and learning-by-doing mentorship for children and youth in eastern Africa. It encompasses film production, film criticism, cultural journalism, media literacy, marketing, and event planning and organisation.

== Origins ==
Lola Kenya Screen was established in October 2005 by arts and culture practitioner Ogova Ondego, who has been its Managing Trustee and Creative Director since then. The name Lola Kenya Screen is Bantu and means "see or watch films in Kenya". Lola Kenya Screen aims to seek, identify, nurture and promote creative talent among children and youth through hands-on skills development programmes in areas such as journalism, film-making, arts appreciation, and organisation and presentation of cultural and creative events.

== Objectives ==
The Memorandum and Articles of Association of Lola Kenya Screen are in Chapter 486 of the Laws of Kenya, under which Lola Kenya Screen is incorporated. Its main objectives are:

- To make the means of film production accessible to emerging talents;
- To build an audience for African films by encouraging culturally relevant, audience-sensitive films in local languages, cultures and reality;
- To promote film skills and develop talent in Kenya;
- To produce at least six films each year from film production workshops;
- To collaborate with national and international partners in the training of young talents who wish to further their expertise in screenplay writing, cinematography, art department, sound, acting, directing, and producing.

== Programmes ==
=== Skills Development ===
During the festival, children and youth serve on the film selection committee, programme preparation and presentation (Master of Ceremonies, MC), film jury, festival press (cultural journalism), and in the film-making workshop, which produces at least five short films for children and youth.

- The Festival Press programme aims to raise the standards of creative and cultural journalism in eastern Africa.
- The Production Workshop seeks to equip children and youth with the skills to make films.
- The Programme Organisation and Presentation (MC) programme mentors participants in the organisation and presentation of events and programmes.
- The Film Jury enables participants to develop critical appreciation of creative work in general and film in particular. The jury members, all of whom are children and youth, watch films and assign awards.
- The Media Literacy programme develops understanding of the opportunities and dangers inherent in modern mass media and how to avoid problems by informed participation.

Since August 2006, when Lola Kenya Screen opened her doors to the first group of participants, some 254 children and youth had by December 2011 passed through her.

=== Other programmes ===
Marketing

This is the platform on which various stakeholders network, publicise and market values, products and services targeting children, youth and family during the festival. Docs for Kids, a programme for trainers of trainers of makers of documentary films for children and youth, and IPO-Eastern Africa, for instance, were launched here. This is also the entry point for international productions into eastern Africa, as many of the international films exhibited here are unlikely to be shown anywhere else in Africa, which has hardly any market for children and youth films.

Schools outreach

Lola Kenya Screen showcases films in educational institutions in and around Nairobi and helps to make pupils and students aware of the importance of mass media in modern societies.

Community screening and mobile cinema

Lola Kenya Screen collaborates with various partners to show films, conduct workshops and host seminars in communities in Nairobi and its environs. One such partner is Slum-TV, with whom Lola Kenya Screen reaches out to the public in the slums of Mathare, Huruma, Jericho and Kibera.

Lola Kenya Screen film forum

This is a monthly showcase of films from eastern Africa that has been held since December 15, 2005. Held on the last Monday of every month at the Goethe-Institut in Nairobi, the forum is a gathering of film students, filmmakers, film journalists, producers, art directors and others. Films are screened and participants hold discussions and explore other initiatives to advance film-making in the region.

== Film festival ==
The annual Lola Kenya Screen film festival takes place in the first full week of August. Since 2008 it has also hosted the Kids For Kids Festival-Africa (KFKF-A) competition for films made by children for children across Africa.

The film festival focuses on films by children and youth, films by students, amateurs and professionals for children and youth, and films involving children and youth. During the festival, children (6- to 13-year-olds) and youth (14- to 25-year-olds) serve on the film selection committee, on the film jury, in programme preparation and presentation (MC), in the festival press (creative journalism), and in the practical film-making workshop that produces at least five short films for children and youth.

The festival exhibits the best possible films, both local and international, for children, youth and family. It showcases films in all kinds of formats, categories and genres: short films; long films; children's and youth films; animation; African films; experimental films; creatively packaged music videos; television series and programmes; feature films; documentary films; public service announcements and commercials; student films; and computer games.

=== Details ===
During the inaugural event in 2006, participants under the guidance of Antonia Ringbom of Finland made a compilation of nine short cartoons that won the Africa Grand Prize for achievement in a film made by children at the 5th World Summit on Media for Children in Johannesburg, South Africa, in 2007. In 2007 and 2008, children and youth under the guidance of Finnish Maikki Kantola, Egyptian Abdel Latif, and Dutch Duco Tellegen made 14 films and 3 songs that were showcased all over the world and won several accolades and awards: the 2nd Kids For Kids Festival Africa Competition grand prize in 2008; the Special Jury Prize at 17th Jugend Medien Festival in Berlin in 2008; represented Africa at the global Kids For Kids Festival Competition in 2008; nominated for Best Animation at the 5th Africa Movie Academy Awards in 2009; and nominated for Best Short Documentary at the 5th Africa Movie Academy Awards in 2009. These films are still on the festival circuit around the world.

== Achievements ==
Between August 2006 and December 2011, Lola Kenya Screen has trained 254 children and youth from Kenya, Uganda, Rwanda, Zanzibar, Tanzania and Zimbabwe in media skills and 6 adults in making documentaries for children and youth. Its mentorship programme has produced more than 30 films since 2006, including several that have won awards and accolades on the international film circuit. In 2011, Happy Times by Elaine Nesbitt and Manani Ogres by Samuel Musembi, Joseph Hongo, Marcus Kang’ethe and Norrick Mwangi were selected to take part in the sixth Busan International Kids' Film Festival in South Korea.

Lola Kenya Screen 2008 attracted participation from Kenya, Uganda, Tanzania, and Zimbabwe, and films from 56 countries were shown. Between 2006 and 2011, Lola Kenya Screen has showcased more than 1950 films from 102 countries.

== Awards ==
The Lola Kenya Screen festival comprises several film exhibition sections. The main film prizes are the Golden Mboni Award for the best children's film and the 14-Plus Award for the best youth film. Other prizes include the Most Creative Project, Children's Rights, Best Animation, Best Documentary, Best Fiction, Best Experimental Film, Best Student Film, Best Kenyan Film, and Best Eastern Africa Film.

== Award winners ==
Winners of the Golden Mboni prize for the best children's films have included Dutch Mischa Kamp's Tony 10 (2012), Belgian Vincent Bruno's Le Maillot de Cristiano (Cristiano Ronaldo's Shirt, 2011), Nigerian Mak Kusare's Champions of Our Time (2010), Italian Marco Gianfreda's Io Parlo (I'll Tell on You, 2009), Swedish Peter Naess's Hoppet (Leaps and Bounds, 2008), Israeli Itai Lev's Giborim Kitanin (2007), and Ukrainian Koval Stepan's Zlydni (2006).

Winners of the 14-Plus Award for the best youth film, a prize introduced in 2009 out of recognition that the festival was growing and catered to both children and youth, are German Daniel Hedfeld and René Sydow's Das Geheime Zimmer(Secret Room, 2012), Madagascan Mamihasina Raminosoa and Andriamanisa Radoniaina's Dzaomalaza et le Saphir Bleu (Dzaomalaza and the Blue Sapphire, 2011), Malawian Charles Shemu Joyah’s Seasons of a Life (2010), and South African Minky Schlesinger's Ugugu no Andile (Gugu and Andile, 2009).

The Best Animation Award has gone to Gamba Trista (Loser Leg) by Francesco Filippi of Italy (2011), Lost and Found by Philip Hunt of the United Kingdom (2010), which also won the Silver Mboni Award for the second best children's film and the Audience's Choice Award, Zlamana Pieczpc (The Broken Seal) by Pawel Czarzasty of Poland (2009), Max's Words by Galen Fott and Jerry Hunt of the United States (2008), and More, Strycku, and Proc Je Slane? (The Sea, Uncle, Why Is It Salty?) by Jan Balej of the Czech Republic (2007).

Zlamana Pieczpc by Pawel Czarzasty and Ksiezycowa Kraina (Lunar Land) by Andrzej Kukula, both of Poland, won the Best TV Series Award and the Best Animation Film Award, respectively, in 2009. Another Polish production, Magiczne Drzewo (The Magic Tree) by Andrzej Maleszka won the 2010 Best TV Series Award.

Winners of the Best Student Film Award have included Znikniecie (Vanishing, 2012) by Bartosz Kruhlik', Jutro (Tomorrow) by Bartosz Kruhlik of Poland (2011), Great Expectations by Alexei Gubenco of Romania (2010), Elephants by Sally Pearce of the United Kingdom (2009), and Vika by Tsivia Barkai of Israel (2006).

Among others, the Best Documentary Film Award has gone to Paradiso by Italian Alessandro Negrini, working in Northern Ireland (2011), Big Sister Punam by Serbian Lucian and Natasa Muntean (2010), A Beautiful Tragedy by Norway-based David Kinsella of the UK (2009), which also took the 14-Plus Award for the second best youth film, and Journey of a Red Fridge by Lucian Muntean and Natasa Stankovic of Serbia (2008).

Other winners have included Polish Wojciech Nowak's Przebunie.txt (Awakening)(Most Experimental Film Award, 2012), Kenyan Kwame Nyong’o's The Legend of Ngong Hills (Best Eastern African Film Award, 2012), Spanish Jose y Cesar Esteban Alenda's Matara A Un Nino (The Child will Die) (Best Short Film Award, 2012) Indian P R Ramadasa Naidu's Kruthi (The Title Deed)(Environmental Conservation Award, 2012), Venezuelan Prakriti Maduro's I Wanna Shine (Special Commendation, 2012), US-based Palestinian Cherien Dabis's Itmana (Best Experimental Film prize, 2006), Porque Hay Casa Que Nunca Se Olvidan (Because There Are Things You Never Forget) by Lucas Figueroa of Spain (Best Short Film, 2008), Bayelsan Silhouettes by Communicating for Change, based in Nigeria (Special Youth Prize in 2010), Bloody Footy by Dean Chircop of Australia (Audience's Choice Award, 2007), Zebu and the Photofish by Kenyan Zipporah Nyaruri (Best Kenyan Film, 2011), Vorstadtkrokodile (The Crocodiles) by German Christian Ditter (Silver Mboni Award for the second best children's film, 2010), El Regala de la Pachamama (The Gift of Pachamama) by Matsushita Toshifumi of the United States (The Child Rights Prize, 2009), The Happy Duckling by Israeli Gili Dolev (Silver Mboni Award for the second best children's film, 2009), Winning Streak by Marc de Launay of the United Kingdom (Silver Mboni Award for the second best children's film, 2006), From a Whisper by Wanuri Kahiu of Kenya (14-Plus Award for the Third Best Youth Film, 2009), Pamela by Kenyan James Kanja (Bronze Mboni for the third best children's film, 2009 ), Subira by Ravneet Chadha of India/Kenya (Bronze Mboni for the third best children's film, 2008), Real Saharawi by Caroline Kamya of Uganda (Best Eastern Africa Film, 2007), Kibera Kid by Kenya-based Nathan Collett of the United States (Best Kenyan Children's Film, 2006), and We Were Young by Philippe Talavera of Namibia (14-Plus Award for the Second Best Youth Film, 2010).

Spanish films dominated the awards list in the 6th Lola Kenya Screen in 2011. The Silver Mboni for the second best children's film went to Pizzangrillo (Lighthearted Boy) by Marco Gianfreda of Italy, and the Bronze Mboni for the third best children's film went to Volterata (Somersault) by Alex Morante of Spain, which also won the Most Experimental Film prize. La Playa de Berlin (Cannon Beach) by Manuel Calvo of Spain won the 14-Plus Award for the second best youth film, and Mi Otra Mitad (My Other Half) by Beatriz Sanchis, also of Spain, took the 14-Plus Award for the third best youth film. Other winners included Mute by Muayad Alayan of Palestine (Best Children's Rights Film). The Ombetja Yehinga Organisation headed by Philippe Talavera of Namibia wone a Special Youth Prize for their three films Sex and Chocolate, Teddy Bear Love and Make a Move. The 14-Plus Award Special Commendation went to Bizzaire by Kenyan Martin Ndichu. Serbians Lucian and Natasa Muntean received the Best Documentary Special Commendation award for Mbaabu and the Mountains of the Moon. The 5th Kids for Kids Festival Africa Prize was shared by Kenyan productions Monsters of the New Age by Brian Saruni and Vanessa's Dream by Adede Hawi and Daki Mohammed.

== Facilitators, Mentors and Resource People ==
Some of the specialists who have mentored children and youth at Lola Kenya Screen have included Antonia Ringbom of Finland/Sweden(Animation film production, 2006), Maikki Kantola of Finland (Animation film production, 2007), Eid Abdel Latif of Egypt (Animation film production, 2008), Duco Tellegen and Meike Statema of The Netherlands (Documentary filmmaking for children and youth, 2008), Anette Tony Hansen of Denmark (Television drama for children and youth, 2009), Signe Zeilich-Jensen (Film judging, 2008), Fina Sensada-Boixader of Spain (Documentary filmmaking, 2009), Rut Gomez Sobrino of Spain (Journalism, 2009), Florence Sipalla of Kenya (Programme planning, 2008), and Kenyans Cajetan Boy (Film scripting, 2011) and Ogova Ondego (cultural journalism, creative writing, critical appreciation of creativity, film judging, media literacy, programme planning, 2006–2011).

Other facilitators have included David Kinsella of Norway (Film editing, 2008), Emily Wanja, Wanjiru Kairu and Vincho Nchogu of Kenya (Documentary filmmaking, 2009), and Allan Aligula of Kenya (Documentary filmmaking, 2010).

Motivational guest speakers on film-making have included Kenyan Judy Kibinge, Wanuri Kahiu, Guy Wilson, Ali Mwangola and Belgian Aurelien Bodinaux (2010).

The festival has also been attended by film producer Aurelien Bodinaux of Belgium (2009, 2010), TV producer Elahe Kasmaei of Iran (2008), afro-fusion musician Joel Sebunjo of Uganda (2006–2009) and independent filmmakers Aster Bedane of Ethiopia (2009), Ashraf Simwogerere Mayanja of Uganda (2009), Caroline Kamya of Uganda (2007), Sheila Mulinya of Kenya (2006, 2008, 2009, 2011), Katrin Ender of Germany (2006), Susan Wamburi of Kenya (2006, 2011) and Runcie Chidebe of Nigeria (2009), Kenyan screen actresses Nice Githinji and Janet Kirina (2008), and Fr Pietro Caggiano of Italy (2009, 2011).

== Partnerships ==
Lola Kenya Screen, a Nairobi-based charity, is a member of the International Centre of Cinema for Children and Young People (CIFEJ), an organisation founded in 1955 under the auspices of UNESCO and UNICEF to promote excellence in cinema for children and youth, and of the Kids For Kids Festival (KFKF) community of filmmakers and educators, which promotes audiovisual media content created by children for children. To implement its programmes, Lola Kenya Screen has worked with the Goethe-Institut in Kenya, the Danish Film Institute, Prix Jeunesse of Germany, Africalia of Belgium, the Jan Vrijman Fund of the International Documentary Festival Amsterdam (IDFA) of The Netherlands, UNESCO, the Prince Claus Fund for Culture and Development of the Netherlands, and ComMattersKenya and ArtMatters. Info of Kenya. The partnership with UNESCO enabled Lola Kenya Screen to host the first film summit for independent television and audiovisual media content producers in eastern Africa, which gave birth to the Nairobi Declaration and IPO-Eastern Africa network of audiovisual media and Television producers in the Great Lakes and Horn of Africa regions. The collaboration with Africalia produced a network of film festivals in Africa that bring African cinema to Africans. This arrangement, called Cinetoile and funded by the European Commission and the Belgian Development Cooperation in 2010, helped strengthen Lola Kenya Screen's school and neighbourhood film screening outreach programme.
