= Boogeyman 2 =

2007 film by Jeff Betancourt

- Official DVD cover
- Directed by: Jeff Betancourt
- Written by: Brian Sieve
- Produced by: Steve Hein; Gary Bryman
- Starring: Danielle Savre; Matt Cohen; David Gallagher; Mae Whitman; Renee O'Connor; Tobin Bell
- Cinematography: Nelson Cragg
- Edited by: Jeff Betancourt
- Music by: Joseph LoDuca
- Production companies: Destination Films; Ghost House Pictures
- Distributed by: Sony Pictures Home Entertainment
- Release date: October 20, 2007 (Screamfest Horror Film Festival)
- Running time: 92 minutes
- Country: United States
- Language: English
- Budget: $4.5 million
- Box office: $4.3 million

Boogeyman 2 is a 2007 American psychological slasher film edited and directed by Jeff Betancourt and the sequel to the 2005 film Boogeyman. The film was written by Brian Sieve and stars Danielle Savre, Matt Cohen, David Gallagher, Mae Whitman, Renee O'Connor, and Tobin Bell. Savre portrays Laura Porter, a woman who witnessed her parents' murder alongside her brother as a child. She believes the killer to be the Boogeyman, and now as an adult seeks group therapy to overcome her phobia of the creature. Her fears then become reality as her fellow patients are murdered one by one.

Due to the original film's success, Boogeyman 2 was greenlit and announced in October 2006. Production began that same month with the hiring of Betancourt as director and Sieve attached as writer. Casting began that December with the hiring of O'Connor; Savre got the lead role in January 2007. Filming took place in Los Angeles at the former Linda Vista Community Hospital, over a four-month period, beginning in January 2007 and concluding in April. Unlike the original film, which featured the Boogeyman as a supernatural being, Betancourt strove to present a more grounded and realistic version of the mythical creature. Emphasis was placed on the writing and atmosphere to compensate for the film's small $4.5 million budget.

After screening at the Screamfest Horror Film Festival on October 20, 2007, Boogeyman 2 was released direct-to-video in the United States on January 8, 2008; it was later released theatrically in Russia and Italy. It received largely negative reviews from critics, although it was deemed to be a general improvement over its predecessor. Attention was especially given to the human-like nature of the Boogeyman in the film, which reviewers felt was preferable to monsters in other contemporary creature features, including the previous film. Despite a mediocre commercial performance, recouping slightly less than its budget, the film received a sequel, Boogeyman 3, the following year.

== Plot ==
Young children Laura Porter and her brother Henry witness their parents' brutal murder by a hooded man, whom they believe to be the Boogeyman. As an adult, Henry has attended group therapy, improving such that he is instead currently looking for work. Laura joins this group as he leaves, meeting the other members: nyctophobic Mark, germaphobic Paul, masochistic Alison, agoraphobic and commitment-averse Darren, and Nicky, a bulimic girl who fears extreme weight gain.

Upon her joining, however, the members of the group are targeted and murdered one by one. All of their deaths relate to their fears: Mark falls down an elevator shaft, trying to escape from the darkness when the lights go out, and is torn in half. Paul accidentally consumes a cockroach while eating a bag of chips; he is given cleaning solution by a masked figure, and upon drinking it, burns a hole in his throat. Laura begins to suspect these deaths are not accidental. The hospital loses power, leaving Laura, Alison, Darren, Nicky, Dr. Jessica Ryan, and the receptionist Gloria in the dark. Gloria goes to the basement to turn the lights back on, but once the patients return to their rooms, Alison is tied to her bed by the figure who places maggots on her arms, which burrow into the self-inflicted incisions in her skin, and she kills herself attempting to cut them out.

Dr. Ryan goes to the basement to check on Gloria, but is electrocuted by the killer while standing in a puddle of water. Laura finds a file on her brother and those of other patients with bogyphobia—phobia of the Boogeyman. She learns that all bogyphobia patients - including Tim Jensen - have committed suicide after being treated by Dr. Mitchell Allen. Laura learns from Darren that Dr. Allen went to sadistic measures to cure her brother by locking him in a closet which Laura fears might have sent Henry over the edge. Laura finds Alison's corpse, but her remains disappear after she leaves to alert the others. Darren and Nicky go to his room, where they argue about the viability of their relationship. After Nicky leaves the room, the Boogeyman disembowels Darren and remove his heart before capturing Nicky, who is found by Laura on a basement table with hoses attached to her, pumping bile into her body until she explodes.

The Boogeyman chases Laura through the hospital; along the way she finds Gloria's body and Dr. Ryan, barely alive and mumbling in a trance-like state. She also runs into Dr. Allen, who believes Laura committed the killings. He tries to sedate her, but is stopped by the Boogeyman who stabs him and shoves two needles into his eyes. The Boogeyman is revealed to be Henry; Dr. Allen did lock him in a closet in an attempt to treat his bogyphobia, and the Boogeyman possessed Henry. The chase ends when Laura decapitates the Boogeyman with gardening shears. The police arrive and discover that under the Boogeyman mask is Dr. Ryan; after killing Dr. Allen but prior to chasing Laura, Henry put the mask on the doctor and escaped. Laura realizes that Henry is running free and is framed for the murders and arrested.

In a post-credits scene, the Boogeyman looks at a picture of Laura and Henry as adults before disappearing.

== Cast ==
- Danielle Savre as Laura Porter
  - Sammi Hanratty as Young Laura Porter
- Matt Cohen as Henry Porter / Boogeyman
  - Jarrod Bailey as Young Henry Porter
- Tobin Bell as Dr. Mitchell Allen
- Chrissy Griffith as Nicky
- Renee O'Connor as Dr. Jessica Ryan
- Michael Graziadei as Darren
- Mae Whitman as Alison
- Johnny Simmons as Paul
- David Gallagher as Mark
- Lesli Margherita as Gloria
- Tom Lenk as Perry
- Lucas Fleischer as Mr. Porter
- Suzanne Jamieson as Mrs. Porter
- Christopher John Fields as Detective

== Production ==
=== Development and filming ===
Evolution of the killer's mask, dubbed "Boogie Mask", throughout various stages of development. Ranging from concept art (left), to early build (center) and the finished product (right).

Boogeyman 2 was first announced in October 2006 due to the financial success of its predecessor with Jeff Betancourt, film editor of The Exorcism of Emily Rose, When a Stranger Calls and The Grudge 2, making his directorial debut and Brian Sieve attached as writer. The film was slated to start development in January 2007 in Los Angeles, California. It was produced by Ghost House Pictures, a film production company created by Sam Raimi and Robert Tapert which specializes in creating horror films. Betancourt stated that he wanted to avoid usage of CGI as well as present a new take on the Boogeyman rather than rehashing the storyline of the first film; this led to a more grounded version of the creature in the film. As a result, and due to the film's low budget, he focused especially on the atmosphere and writing. Storyboards were used extensively to plan out the film and minimize wasted effort and resources by make-up artists on unused prosthetics; the limited budget meant that most effects could only be filmed once. The former hospital Linda Vista Community Hospital served as the primary filming location for the mental institution.

=== Casting ===
Renee O'Connor was cast as Dr. Jessica Ryan in December 2006. O'Connor had visited her friend and producer Rob Tapert on the New Zealand set, where they discussed "the differences of having a supernatural demon versus a real person that can come in and be a threat." She concluded the former was scarier. On getting cast in the film and her approach to the character, she said:

I had a contract with Rob Tapert and I just emailed him and said that I really wanted to play this character. I think she would be interesting because it touches back on some of the things I've played as an actress, and that was it. [...] It was so tight in the dialogue, you just have to play with the relationships and find other things going on with the characters to make it seem like there's more depth to what's going on, that there's more of a history between them.

In mid-January, Danielle Savre was cast as the film's lead Laura Porter. On Savre, Betancourt stated that "[she] has been incredible so far and has been a real trooper. We've [...] had her running up and down these halls screaming, throwing blood on her, throwing vomit on her, throwing guts on her and she's held up so far." Tobin Bell was cast as Dr. Mitchell Allen in February and Matt Cohen as Laura's brother Henry in March. Bell modeled his portrayal after Dick Cheney.

=== Effects ===
The special effects were handled by Quantum Creation FX, who were involved with the project throughout the entire duration of filming. Ten artisans and technicians were involved in creating severed heads, puppets, prosthetic makeup, and gore gags. The killer's mask was designed by Jerad S. Marantz, and the Boogeyman itself was based on Betancourt's own childhood fears, with "skeletal things and bird corpses" as inspiration for its skin texture.

== Release ==
=== Theatrical ===
Boogeyman 2 was screened in a sold-out showing on October 20, 2007, at the Screamfest Horror Film Festival in Grauman's Chinese Theatre, Hollywood. During the same month, it was announced that the film would be released on DVD on January 8, 2008. The film was released theatrically in both Russia, where it stayed in theaters for two weeks, and Italy. Boogeyman 2 made at least $2,484,219 from its domestic video sales and a further $1,798,418 from its international releases, bringing the total gross to $4,282,637.

=== Home media ===
The DVD, which was released as "Unrated Director's Cut" and lacks an MPAA rating, includes two different commentaries. The first features director Betancourt and writer Sieve while the second features actors Bell and Savre along with producers Hein and Bryman. The DVD includes a documentary called "Bringing Fear to Life: Makeup Effects from Storyboards to Screen," which shows some of the film's development using storyboards. The film has also been digitally released on Google Play, Amazon Video and Hulu.

== Reception ==
=== Critical response ===
Like the original film, Boogeyman 2 was also panned by critics who noted its terrible writing, predictable plot, overuse of jumpscares and unlikable characters as its biggest faults. Brandon Ciampaglia of IGN described it as "yet another stupid horror film" and gave it a score of 4/10. Ryan Turek of ComingSoon.net criticized the story, characters, and lack of suspense, but found the film more entertaining than the original, with better acting than it deserved. He added that despite the movie's low budget, "[Betancourt] has hashed together a fine-looking film that’s technically competent." Tristan Sinns of Dread Central awarded the "textbook slasher" two out of five stars, criticizing it for not featuring the mythological Boogeyman and having unsympathetic characters but praising the death scenes as "rather creative."

Positive reviews praised the film for presenting a more realistic approach to the Boogeyman and eschewing CGI, both of which were considered improvements over its predecessor. Its death scenes were highly praised for being extremely violent and gory. Many reviewers also recognized that the film exceeded their expectations despite its direct-to-video status and low budget. Shawn Lealos of CHUD.com gave the film a score of 6.8 out of ten, stating that it was "a very solid little horror flick that forgoes the ridiculous CGI and hokum supernatural aspects of the first movie, as well as the restraints of PG-13." In a similar review, Matthew Stern of PopMatters praised the film and its "splattery flourishes" in comparison to its predecessor, giving it eight stars out of ten, with a consensus reading: "A film that bucks the stigma of direct-to-DVD sequels, this unyieldingly dark and bloody feature will surprise you, especially if you were unfortunate enough to catch the first one." David Nusair of Reel Film Reviews also praised Boogeyman 2 over the first film, particularly for its "satisfying kill sequences" and an entertaining supporting cast. While he criticized the middle half as "uneventful," he felt that the film "recovers nicely for a surprisingly enthralling third act" and gave it 2.5/4 stars.

== Sequel ==
A sequel, titled Boogeyman 3, premiered at the Screamfest Horror Film Festival on October 18, 2008; it was released direct-to-video on January 20, 2009. Brian Sieve came back as writer. However, the film features new cast members and characters, taking place on a college campus and starring Erin Cahill. Returning to the form of the first movie, the Boogeyman is again portrayed as a supernatural entity.
