= Talking Telephone Numbers =

British game show

- Genre: Game show
- Presented by: Phillip Schofield; Emma Forbes (1994–96); Claudia Winkleman (1997)
- Starring: Cash Peters (1994)
- Announcer: Bruce Hammal (1994–95); Enn Reitel (1996); Caroline Feraday (1997)
- Country of origin: United Kingdom
- Original language: English
- No. of series: 4
- No. of episodes: 62

Production
- Production location: Fountain Studios
- Running time: 30 minutes (inc. adverts)
- Production company: Celador Productions in association with Carlton

Original release
- Network: ITV
- Release: 28 February 1994 – 29 December 1997

Talking Telephone Numbers was a British game show that aired on ITV from 28 February 1994 to 29 December 1997 and was hosted by Phillip Schofield and initially Emma Forbes, who was later replaced by Claudia Winkleman. The show's format featured variety acts which were used to generate numbers. Viewers had the chance to win up to £25,000 if the five random numbers generated during the program matched the last five digits of their telephone number in any order.

== Format ==
An act would perform for everyone watching and play a short game that generated a number from 0 to 9. Five digits were selected in this manner, and these were meant to match the last five digits of a viewer's telephone number in any order. Viewers who did would call the show via an onscreen telephone number, and hopefully be answered by one of 96 telephonists. If one of the telephonists answered them, they would become a potential contestant. While the telephonists took in their calls, a pop singer would sing their latest single or a final act would perform.

A phone line was then picked at random, and that viewer would have a chance to win money. They would then have to answer three questions with numerical answers. Getting them all right won the game; an incorrect answer, however, resulted in another line being picked. This went on until someone won the game.

The winner of the game would be given a choice to either take £10,000 or take a cash prize attached to their telephonist (ranging from £1,000 to £25,000); regardless of choice, the telephonist would reveal their value, which almost nobody took.

== International versions ==
=== Australia ===
An Australian version aired in early 1996 on the Seven Network, hosted by Rob Elliott and Bridget Adams and produced by Grundy and Celador (the show's format creator). It lasted three weeks before being cancelled due to low ratings.

=== Malaysia ===
In Malaysia, Talking Telephone Numbers aired on TV3 in 2002 hosted by Khairil Rashid sponsored by TM.

=== Serbia ===
In Serbia, Talking Telephone Numbers aired on RTS 1 in 2004-2005 hosted by Aleksandar Srećković, Nataša Pavlović & Irena Spasić.

== Transmissions ==
Series	Start date	End date	Episodes
1	28 February 1994	9 May 1994	10
2	4 January 1995	24 April 1995	17
3	8 January 1996	29 April 1996	17
4	1 September 1997	29 December 1997	18
