= Suzan Crowley =

American actress

- Born: United Kingdom
- Occupations: Actress, producer, narrator
- Years active: 1977–present

Suzan Crowley (/ˌsuːzən ˈkroʊli/) is an English-American actress, best known for her role as Maria Rossi in The Devil Inside.

== Filmography ==
=== Film ===
Year	Title	Role	Notes
1981	Outside In	Unknown	
1982	The Disappearance of Harry	Reporter	
1982	Uliisses	Unknown	
1982	The Draughtsman's Contract	Mrs Pierpoint	
1984	Success Is the Best Revenge	First Inspector	
1987	Born of Fire	The Woman	
1988	Christabel	Lexi	
1988	The Zero Option	Sally Barber	
1989	Heritage Africa	Unknown	
2004	Slightly Thicker Than Water	Woman in Diner	Short
2006	Princess	Carolyn Kramer	Short
2009	Wild About Harry	Gertie	Originally titled American Primitive. Acted and produced
2009	La Premiere	Josephine	Short
2012	The Devil Inside	Maria Rossi	Nominated – Fright Meter Film Awards for Best Supporting Actress
2012	Liz & Dick	Cleopatra Hair Stylist	

=== Television ===
Year	Title	Role	Notes
1977	Just William	Gloria	Episode: "William Finds a Job"
1980	Exchange and Divide	Secretary	
1984	Ever Decreasing Circles	Caroline	Episode: "A Strange Woman"
1985	Hold Back the Page	Extra	Episode: "Dark Horses"
1987	Screen Two	Louisa	Episode: "Will You Love Me Tomorrow"
1989	A TV Dante	Lucy	
1991	Devices and Desires	Hilary Robarts	TV mini-series
1991	Bergerac	Cressida Draper	Episode: "All for Love"
1992	The Old Boy Network	Extra	Episode: "Kiss and Sell"
1994	The Knock	Nicki Lucas	7 episodes
1995–1996	Backup	DCI Helen Chivers	8 episodes
1998	Grange Hill	Ms. Soames	Episode 21.14
2001	Family Law	Dr. Elyssa Gilmar	Episode: "Firm at Eleven"
2005	All of Us	Mrs. Samantha Thompson	Episode: "School Colors"
2017	Escape the Night	Queen Vampire	2 episodes
