= Cash Peters =

British author and broadcaster (born 1956)

Cashman "Cash" Peters (born 6 June 1956) is a British author and broadcaster who writes on travel and spiritual matters, and has published two mystery novels. He is also a handwriting analyst.

== Early life and career ==
Peters was born in Stockport, England. By 15, he had written material for radio and TV shows including The Two Ronnies and The News Huddlines. After graduating from the University of Hull with a law degree, he was employed at the High Court of Justice in London, and in his spare time worked as a reporter on Capital Radio's The Way It Is news magazine. He turned to full-time journalism, winning several awards for travel reporting and presented Wildfire, a series of travel specials on BBC Radio. In 1987 his series Around the World in Ninety Seconds won the Best Light Entertainment Writer Award at the New York Radio Festival. In 1994 he co-presented the ITV game show Talking Telephone Numbers.

1990 saw the publication of his first book, The World Domination Handbook (New English Library), a light hearted parody. He also writes on handwriting analysis, including three books: The Telltale Alphabet, with Loveday Miller (Corgi 1995), Instant Insight (Grand Central Publishing 1998), and Love Letters: Let His Handwriting Be Your Guide (Citadel 2003). In 1997 he moved to Los Angeles, California, where he lives with his partner.

Peters appeared for two seasons in the Travel Channel TV show Stranded with Cash Peters, and wrote the book Naked in Dangerous Places about his experiences. In 2003 he wrote Gullible's Travels: The Adventures of a Bad Taste Tourist. following his radio series The Bad Taste Tours, which won the Benjamin Franklin Literary Award for Humor. Until January 2012 he contributed a short show business segment on BBC Radio 5 Live's Up All Night with Rhod Sharp, and appeared as a commentator on American Public Media's Marketplace.

In 2011 a third travel book, A Little Book About Believing, The Transformative Healing Power of Faith, Love And Surrender (Penner) was published. This details Peters's experiences at The House of John of God in Brazil. In 2012 he wrote his first mystery novels, Force of Habit: Sister Madeleine Investigates ( Penner) and Horror at Horsfield Lodge: A Chillingley Village Mystery (Penner).

His next book, Why Your Life Matters (2014 Penner) is a spiritual work, which is written in the form of a novel. A fourth travel book, The Best Vacation Ever! The Highs And Woes of River Cruising in Provence (2014 Penner), followed. This is an account of the author's trip down the river Rhône with a group of friends, taking in the tours along the way. Cash Peters is a regular contributor to Spirituality and Health magazine.

== Handwriting analysis ==
Peters is a handwriting analyst. His method differs from that of graphology in that he claims to channel the energy from the writing. He has purportedly demonstrated this on the TV shows Entertainment Tonight, The View and The Montel Williams Show. He has also acted as consultant to the Smithsonian Institution.

== Operation Parallax ==
In 1979, Peters staged an elaborate April Fool's joke on Capital Radio's Sunday Soapbox, posing as a concerned listener who claimed the government planned to cancel the following two Thursdays to correct errors that had occurred due to switching the clocks back and forth every year to account for British Summer Time. Forty-eight hours had accumulated altogether, and under "Operation Parallax" the following two Thursdays would be cancelled and the calendar would jump from Wednesday to Friday.

== Television shows ==
- Stranded with Cash Peters
- Talking Telephone Numbers ITV 1994

== Radio shows ==
- The Savvy Traveler
- APM's Maketplace
- BBC Radio 5 Live Up All Night Segment 1997–2012

== Movies ==
- Fog City Mavericks: voice of Charlie Chaplin

== Awards ==
- Benjamin Franklin Literary Award for Humor for Gullible's Travels (2004)
- New York Radio Festival for Best Light Entertainment Writer Award (1987)
- Peabody Award For Journalism Jointly With Marketplace Team 2002

== Bibliography ==
=== Books ===
- Peters, Cash (1990). The world domination handbook: rule the world within a year or your money back. London: New English Library. ISBN 978-0-450-532245.
- Peters, Cash (1995-07-06) The Telltale Alphabet. Corgi ISBN 978-0-552-14325-7
- Peters, Cash (1998-01-06) Instant Insight: Secrets of Life, Love And Destiny Revealed in Your Handwriting. Grand Central Publishing. ISBN 9780446673556.
- Peters, Cash (2003-01-01) Love Letters: Let His Handwriting Be Your Guide. Citadel. ISBN 0806524774
- Peters, Cash (2003-06-01) Gullible's Travels: The Adventures of a Bad Taste Tourist. Globe Pequot Press . ISBN 978-0-7627-2714-8. Audio CD (2007-01-02) Blackstone Audio Inc. ISBN 978-1433200717 Also available as a download.
- Peters, Cash (2009-04-21) Naked in Dangerous Places. Potter Style, ISBN 978-0-30739635-8, Kindle Edition (2009-04-21) Crown ASIN B0026UNZDG
- Peters, Cash (2010-07-06) Stranded in Dangerous Places. John Blake Publishing Ltd. ISBN 978-1844549719.
- Peters, Cash (2011) A Little Book About Believing: The Transformative Healing Power of Faith, Love and Surrender. Penners. ISBN 978-1-4507-7655-4, Kindle edition ASIN B0053T3AI2
- Peters, Cash (2012) Force of Habit: Sister Madeleine Investigates. Penner Inc. ISBN 978-0984887620 Kindle Edition ASIN B006N01TH4
- Peters, Cash (2013) Horror at Horsfield Lodge: A Chillingley Village Mystery. Kindle edition ASIN B00DII1X34.
- Peters, Cash (2014-02-25) Why Your Life Matters. Penner Press Kindle Edition ASIN B00INFNX0S. Paperback edition Penner Inc (2014) ISBN 978 0984887675.
- Peters, Cash (2014-3-14) Best Vacation Ever! The Highs and Woes of River Cruising in Provence. Penner Press Kindle Edition ASIN. B00J0PCWU2

=== Articles ===
- Peters, Cash (January–February 2013). "The joy of quitting". Spirituality & Health. Vol. 15, no. 6. pp. 24–25.
