= Togetherness Supreme =

- Directed by: Nathan Collett
- Written by: Nathan Collett; Mary Beth Fielder
- Screenplay by: Nathan Collett, Mary Beth Fielder
- Story by: Evans Kamau Kang'ethe
- Produced by: Nathan Collett; Mercy Murugi, Mary Mary Beth Fielder
- Starring: Wilson Maina; Martha Kisaka eddy Onyango; Geoffrey Jefferson; Peter Chege
- Cinematography: Andrew ‘Dru’ Mungai
- Edited by: Christopher King; Jesse Ellis
- Music by: Eric Musyoka
- Production companies: Hot Sun Films; Centro Nacional Autónomo de Cinematografía (CNAC)
- Distributed by: Hot Sun Films; NewFilmmakers
- Release date: 2010
- Running time: 94 minutes
- Countries: Kenya; Venezuela
- Languages: Swahili; English; Kikuyu; Spanish

Togetherness Supreme is a 2010 Kenyan film.

== Synopsis ==
Based on actual events, Togetherness Supreme is the story of Kamau, an artist, searching for change in the midst of tribal tension in the slums. Kamau stands up against his father and his tribe to join a rival tribe with his friend Otieno. Kamau and Otieno fight for political change for those living in extreme poverty, but they are caught up in the middle of the ethnic conflict that tears apart their country and, furthermore, they are rivals for the love of Alice, a preacher's daughter. After a contested presidential election (Kenyan presidential election of December 2007), the slums erupt in violence and Kamau's world collapses around him.

== Plot ==
Togetherness Supreme was made in the aftermath of the 2007–2008 political, economic, and humanitarian crisis that break out after President Mwai Kibaki was re-elected in December 2007. This film dramatizes the post-election violence in Kibera, where police fired on demonstrators and rival groups fighting in the streets. Based on actual occurrences and the ethnic strife that shattered a nation. In the midst of ethnic hostility in the slums, Kamau, an artist, is striving for change. Along with his companion Otieno, Kamau joins the other side, defying his father and his clan. Otieno and Kamau struggle for political reform on behalf of those in extreme poverty. The slums explode in violence following a presidential election battle, shattering Kamau's society.

== Cast ==
- Wilson Maina as Kama
- Geoffrey Jefferson Ong'ong'o as Otieno
- Martha Kisaka as Alice
- Chrisphine Onyango as Masher
- Peter Chege as Mwangi
- Teddy Onyango as Peter
- Owino Kotieno as William
- Billy Oloo as CJ

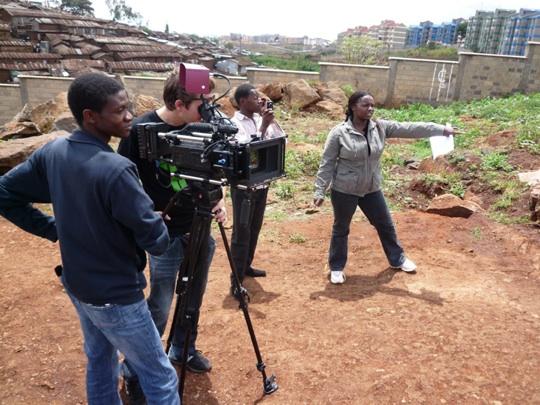
Set still on the shooting of Togetherness Supreme in Kibera slums, Nairobi

== Results ==
The film has had a positive impact on audiences in Kenya and globally, creating interest among Kenyans as the 2012 elections approach. Featuring various tribes, it highlighted the importance of unity collaborative projects. During production, actors were tasked with translating the script from English into their own tribal dialects. This enabling individuals to celebrate their own cultures while engaging with others. The film's vision is to extend its influence beyond Kibera, reaching other parts of Kenya and East Africa. It aims to refine its approach and set a new standard for film education in the region, making it accessible to lower-income communities. It's focus is on talent and ambition over financial means, aiming to leverage local knowledge while incorporating expertise from international educators and professionals from the US and Europe.

== Awards ==
- Africa Movie Academy Awards 2010: 2 awards
- Best International Feature Film – Santa Barbara International Film Festival 2011
- Global Landscape Award – Cinequest Film Festival 2011

| Awarding Organizattion | Category | Year | Nominee | Result |
|---|---|---|---|---|
| Santa barbara International Film Festival | Best International Film | 2011 | Nathan Collett | Won |
| Cinequest San Jose Film Festival | Audience Award | 2010 | Daniel Ruiz Hueck Juan Luis Fermin | Nominated |
| Cinequest San Jose Film Festival | Global Landscape Award | 2011 | Daniel Ruiz Hueck Juan Luis Fermin | Won |
| African Movie Academy Awards | Most Promising Actor | 2010 | Wilson Maina | Won |
| African Movie Academy Awards | Most Promising Actress | 2010 | Martha Kisaka | Nominated |
| African Movie Academy Awards | Best Child Actor | 2010 | Teddy Onyango Billy Oloo | Won |
| Pan African Film Festival | Best Film | 2011 | Togetherness Supreme | Nominated |
| Kalasha International Film and TV Awards | Best Supporting Actor Film | 2010 | Geoffrey Jefferson Ong'ong'o | Won |
| Kalasha International Film and TV Awards | Best Picture | 2010 | Togetherness Supreme | Nominated |
| Kalasha International Film and TV Awards | Best Lead Actor Film | 2010 | Wilson Maina | Nominated |
