= CaribPress =

Monthly newspaper published in California

CaribPress Newsmagazine
- Type: Newspaper
- Format: Tabloid
- Publisher: Lyndon A. Johnson
- Editor: Robert Wheaton
- Founded: 1999, as California CaribPress
- Headquarters: Los Angeles, California
- Price: US$2.00 monthly
- Website: caribpress.com

CaribPress is a monthly newspaper published in California, covering primarily Southern California and the West. As the name suggests, CaribPress has a Caribbean focus. A large part of the paper's editorial content relates to entertainment and sports. It also features regular columns on business, immigration and family law. It is also distributed in various locations throughout the United States, such as New York City and Miami.

Founded as California CaribPress in 1999, the paper was originally published bi-monthly until 2005, when the paper became a monthly. The paper was renamed CaribPress after the first issue.

Reggae singer Maxi Priest graced the publication's first cover. Since that time CaribPress has profiled notable figures from a variety of professions including former Jamaican Prime Minister P. J. Patterson, television executive Paula Madison, Los Angeles City Councilman Bernard Parks and businessman Butch Stewart.

== Awards and recognition ==
- 2011: Interethnic Relations Award for "Iraqi Immigrant's Formula for Success in South L.A." by Sheannette Virtue
