= Fog City Mavericks =

- Directed by: Gary Leva
- Written by: Gary Leva
- Produced by: Gary Leva
- Starring: Francis Ford Coppola; George Lucas; Clint Eastwood; Steven Spielberg; Carroll Ballard; Philip Kaufman
- Narrated by: Peter Coyote
- Cinematography: Yoram Astrakhan
- Edited by: Gary Leva
- Production companies: Leva FilmWorks; Alpha Dog Productions; Alpha Dogs
- Release date: April 29, 2007
- Country: United States
- Language: English

Fog City Mavericks is a 2007 American documentary film directed by Gary Leva. It chronicles the San Francisco Bay Area's most well known filmmakers through interviews and archival footage. It is narrated by Peter Coyote, who is also featured in the film.

The documentary also covers some of the movies made by these filmmakers such as American Graffiti, Star Wars, Indiana Jones, Apocalypse Now, The Godfather, The Black Stallion, Home Alone, Mrs. Doubtfire, and Toy Story.

== Artists, producers and directors featured in the film ==
- George Lucas
- Brad Bird
- Clint Eastwood
- Bruce Conner
- Francis Ford Coppola
- Carroll Ballard
- Philip Kaufman
- Saul Zaentz
- John Korty
- Chris Columbus
- Steven Spielberg
- Cash Peters provides the voice of Charlie Chaplin.

== Release ==
The film premiered at San Francisco's Castro Theater on April 29, 2007. George Lucas and John Lasseter attended as guest speakers.
