= Stranded with Cash Peters =

Stranded with Cash Peters is a reality show/documentary on the Travel Channel created by British travel writer Cash Peters, in which he was dumped in an unfamiliar place with no money, food, or room for the night. He had to rely on the locals to show him around town, buy food for him, and give him a place to stay for the night. Each time-slot consisted of two 22-minute-long episodes. It first aired on June 6, 2005, but was canceled after two seasons. Peters wrote about his experiences making the program in a 2009 book entitled Naked in Dangerous Places.

== Ending ==
The show was moved from its time-slot numerous times, while the network's website neglected to update fans of the changes, causing confusion.

Thirty-one episodes aired in the United States. The show filmed in Grand Isle, Louisiana, was never broadcast out of respect to the victims of Hurricane Katrina. The episode was later shown elsewhere in the world.
