= Kibera Kid =

- Directed by: Nathan Collett
- Written by: Nathan Collett
- Screenplay by: Nathan Collett
- Produced by: Nathan Collett; Leslie Khadondi
- Starring: Ignatius Juma; Geoffrey Twanga; Godfrey Ojiambo; Anthony Shikon’Golo
- Cinematography: Collin Brink
- Edited by: Jesse Ellis
- Music by: Jermaine Stegall
- Production company: Hot Sun Films
- Distributed by: Hot Sun Films
- Release date: 2006
- Running time: 12 minutes
- Country: Kenya
- Languages: Swahili; English; Spanish
- Budget: $25,000

Kibera Kid is a short film set in the Kibera slums in Nairobi, Kenya. It was written, directed and co-produced by Nathan Collett in collaboration with the locals of Kibera.

It gives a balanced view of life in the slum and the choices which youth face. Everyday life is shown is small touches, such as the opening scene with the children running to hear the Kibera Kid rap, the potatoes frying in a large pan, and the young girl peering through the hole in the wall to see what is going on.

The cinematography give the viewer a sense of being present in the slum. The living conditions are neither sensationalized nor sentimentalized. The acting, especially by the lead actor, Ignatius Juma is outstanding. The location, the story and the acting seem very authentic and give the viewer a balanced idea of slum life - both its strengths and challenges.

This twelve-minute film featured Kibera actors in the principal roles. It has played at film festivals worldwide including the Berlin Film Festival and it won a Student Emmy from Hollywood. It has been profiled by the BBC, Reuters and Al Jazeera English. In April 2009, a feature film follow up to Kibera Kid was shot. The full-length film focuses on tribal conflict and the possibility of reconciliation. The film had a larger effect as it led to the formation of Hot Sun Foundation which trains the youth of the slums to make their own films.

== Plot ==
The shooting of Kibera Kid in the Kianda area of Kibera.

Kibera Kid is the story of Otieno, a 12-year-old orphan from Kibera, one of the largest slums in Kenya living with a gang of thieves who must make a choice between gang life and redemption. After a theft gone bad, Otieno is forced to choose between saving an innocent man's life and The Razors, the only family he knows.. The story is fiction but the circumstances and reality depicted are not. Crime and poverty are common in Kibera, yet there are many who will stand for a better life no matter how bad things may seem.

== Cast ==
- Ignatius Juma as Otieno / Kibera Kid
- Godfrey Ojiambo as JL
- Godfrey Twanga

== Awards ==
Year	Awarding Organization	Category	Nominee	Result	Ref
2006	Hamptons International Film Festival	Best Student Film	Kibera Kid	Nominated	
2006	Angelus Film Festival	Honorable Mention	Kibera Kid	Won	
2007	Student Emmys	Best Children's Program	Kibera Kid	Nominated	
2007	ATS Foundation College Television Awards	Children's Program	Kibera Kid	Won	
