= Nathan Collett =

Kenyan film director

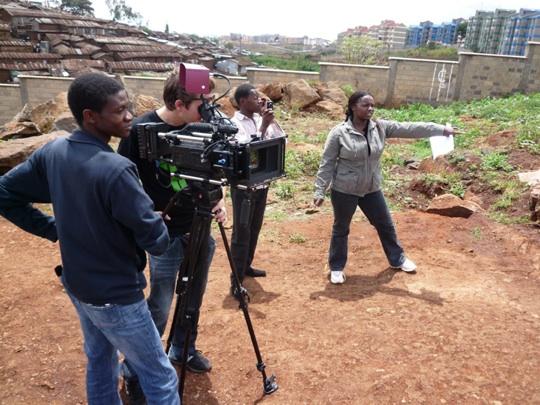
- Nathan Collett (with camera) shooting feature film Togetherness Supreme in collaboration with Kibera youth trainees in Kenya
- Occupation: film director
- Years active: 2000s–present

Nathan Collett is a filmmaker based in Nairobi, Kenya.

== Film career ==
=== Overview ===
Collett's work focuses on those on the margins of society as well as on environmental issues. He has filmed across the world, including location footage in Somalia and South America. He works both in fictional films and on documentaries, with a specific focus on Kibera in Kenya, Africa's largest shantytown. He is a co-owner of Hot Sun Films, a film/video production and training company. One of Hot Sun Films' projects is the Hot Sun Foundation, a non-profit organization. The organization gives training to the youth of Kibera in film and video, and also started the first film school for local youngsters.

=== Films ===
==== The Oath ====
The Oath is a 2005 short drama film written by Collett and Njuguna Wakanyote. Set in 1950s Kenya during the Mau Mau uprising under British colonialism, the film portrays the struggle between two brothers on opposite sides of the conflict.

==== Kibera Kid ====
Kibera Kid is a short film set in the Kibera slums in Nairobi, Kenya. It was written, directed and co-produced by Collett in collaboration with local people in Kibera.

==== Charcoal Traffic ====
In 2008, Collett directed the short film Charcoal Traffic, which was written by and co-produced with the Somali environmentalist Fatima Jibrell. The film was shot on location in Somalia, and employs a fictional storyline to educate the public about the ecological damage that charcoal production can create.

==== Togetherness Supreme ====
In April 2009, Collett shot his first feature film Togetherness Supreme, in collaboration with the local community in front and behind the camera. It is the follow-up to Kibera Kid and was shot on the Red One camera, the first time the camera was used in Kibera to shoot a feature film. The film is set in Kibera, and focusing on tribal tensions and the possibilities of reconciliation in Africa's largest shantytown. Togetherness Supreme was first shown to the community in Kibera where over 3,000 people turned up for one screening, and over 26,000 people watched it in the community. The film has been dubbed "Slumdog without the Millionaires" by the Vancouver International Film Festival, in reference to the 2008 movie Slumdog Millionaire. Togetherness Supreme tells a community-based authentic story of love, conflict and reconciliation in the midst of ethnic and political violence.

== Awards ==
Collett won multiple awards for the short film Kibera Kid. Togetherness Supreme also won 'Best International Film' at the Santa Barbara International Film Festival 2011, which was the US premiere of the film. Togetherness Supreme also won the Global Landscapes Award at Cinequest film festival 2011

== Filmography ==
Collett's films as a director include:

- Togetherness Supreme (2010)
- Charcoal Traffic (2008)
- Chronic in Kenya (2007)
- Sex to Survive (2007)
- Kibera Kid (2006)
- The Oath (2005)
