= Hot Sun Foundation =

Non-profit organization

Hot Sun Foundation is a non-profit organization that works in Nairobi, Kenya with young people from urban slums and other marginalized communities of East Africa to train and expose their talents and potential on the world stage. Hot Sun Foundation trains youth in all aspects of filmmaking, from scriptwriting, camera, sound, pre production, budgeting, production, directing, editing, and marketing. Vision of Hot Sun Foundation: Social transformation through art and media Mission of Hot Sun Foundation: Identify and develop youth talent to tell their stories on film

Current Programs Hot Sun Foundation has three core programs:

1. The Kibera Film School, in Nairobi, Kenya offers comprehensive hands-on film training and production. Youth trainees at KIBERA FILM SCHOOL develop their talents, tell their stories, become role models and thereby transform their communities. The film school has been profiled by various news organizations, most recently the LA Times.
1. Kibera TV Graduates from the Kibera Film School initiated the weekly Kibera TV program in May 2010. Every week, Kibera TV produces at least two short documentaries about life in Kibera. Kibera TV is available on the internet at YouTube, in Nairobi buses, kiberatv.blogspot.com, and at community events and film screenings in schools.
1. Hot Sun Productions offers video services to businesses, community organizations, churches and individuals. The production team of Hot Sun Productions is made up of outstanding graduates from Kibera Film School. HOT SUN PRODUCTIONS markets the short films produced by Kibera TV and Kibera Film School. HOT SUN PRODUCTIONS has an extensive inventory of short films in the following genres: dramas, documentaries, music, public service announcements and promotional videos.

Past and Ongoing Projects In 2007 Hot Sun Foundation worked with Bay Cat of the San Francisco Bay Area to do the first ever video exchange between the youth of Kibera and the youth of the Bay Area known as 'Call and Response.' In 2008, Hot Sun Foundation conducted several workshops with Kibera youth as well as conducting open air film screenings in Kibera with FilmAid International. In April 2009, it collaborated on the filming of the Togetherness Supreme feature film shot in Kibera and focusing on the themes of tribal conflict and the possibility of reconciliation.

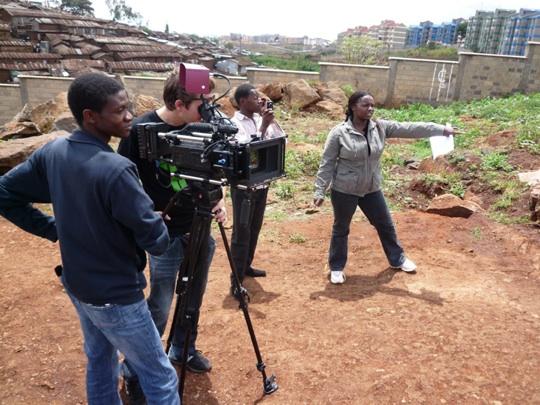
Shooting feature film Togetherness Supreme in collaboration with Kibera youth trainees

Outside the Hot Sun Foundation offices in Kibera
