= Sue Wanjiru =

Kenyan actress

Susan "Sue" Wanjiru
- Born: Kenya
- Occupation: Actress

Susan "Sue" Wangūi Wanjirū is a Kenyan actress. She is famous for two movies in which she acted in 2013 and 2017, titled "Something Necessary" and the award-winning "18 Hours", respectively. She is also a Certified Public Accountant and the founder and key person in the social enterprise, Lokhem Kids Entertainment Ltd., which uses different media to teach children how to become better leaders.

== Career ==
Wanjirū's earlier movie, "Something Necessary" released in 2013 was listed among the 10 best movies of the decade in Kenya. It was directed by Judy Kibinge and was nominated for the Audience Choice Award at the 2013 Chicago International Film Festival. Wanjirū acted as Anne in the movie.

In the second movie she appeared in, "18 Hours" (2017), she was featured as Sabina. The movie was directed by Njue Kevin. In 2018, It became the first Kenyan film to win Overall Best Movie at the Africa Magic Viewers’ Choice Awards (AMVCA).

== Filmography ==
| Year | Title | Role | Notes |
|---|---|---|---|
| 2017 | 18 Hours | Sabina | |
| 2013 | Something Necessary | Anne | |
| 2004 | Massai - Les guerriers de la pluie | Susan Nyambura Wanjiru | |
| 1992 | Saïkati | Ntidai | |
