= Boity Thulo =

South African rapper (born 1990)

- Born: Boitumelo Thulo; 28 April 1990 (age 36); Potchefstroom, North West, South Africa
- Occupations: Television personality; Actress; rapper; model; Entrepreneur
- Years active: Television personality: 2011–present; Rapper: 2017–present
- Height: 1.58m
- Musical career
- Genres: Hip hop; amapiano; motswako
- Instrument: Vocals
- Label: Def Jam Africa
- Website: Official website

Boitumelo Thulo (born 28 April 1990), popularly known as Boity, is a South African television personality, rapper, actress, businesswoman and model. In 2019, Thulo was named as one of Forbes Africa's 30 Under 30 for her contribution in the music and entertainment sector.

She came to spotlight after the release of her debut single "Wuz Dat?" in 2018 featuring Nasty C. In 2020, she signed a record deal with Def Jam Africa and release her EP 4436. The EP was nominated for Best Hip Hop Album at the 27th South African Music Awards.

== Early life ==
Thulo was born in Potchefstroom, North West, where she was raised by her maternal grandmother. She is the only daughter of Modiehi Thulo, her mother.

Thulo studied psychology and criminology at Monash University, but later dropped out because her mother was unable to pay for her varsity fees. She then signed to a casting agency which resulted in her in appearing on a Wimpy commercial in 2010.

== Career ==
=== Film and television ===
Thulo's television career began when she presented the YOTV educational show "Crib Notes" in 2011. She then was a co-host on the SABC 1 The Media Career Guide Show, which she hosted alongside Thomani Mahlaba. She also served host duties in several television shows, including SkyRoom Live, Ridiculousness Africa, Club 808, Zoned, Change Down, and Big Brother Africa.

In 2012, Thulo starred on the drama series Rockville, which was her first starring role. She appeared for all 4 seasons playing "Mpho Bogatsu".

Thulo's film debut was in 2014 when she starred on a comedy short-film Dear Betty, where she played "Betty". She also was featured in the film Mrs Right Guy (2016) where she played "Marie" which was not a huge role.

In October 2021, Boity received a nomination for African Social Star at 47th People's Choice Awards.

=== Music ===
Thulo made her rapping debut on the Migos Culture Tour in South Africa on 21 October 2017 at TicketPro Dome. As Migos were delayed by a few hours, Thulo joined Nasty C as one of the opening acts until the trio arrived.

On 30 August 2018, Thulo released her debut single "Wuz Dat?", featuring Nasty C. The song became the first ever single by a female rapper in South Africa to be certified platinum and this made it the best selling single of all time by a female rapper in that country. It also won the category of "Best Collaboration" at the 2018 South African Hip Hop Awards, thus making her the first lead female rapper to achieve this.

On 8 February 2019, she released her second single titled "Bakae".

In October 2022, Boity headlined Rose Fest along with Ami Faku, Simmy and Busiswa. On 4 December 2020, she released the EP 4436, centering mainly on Boity, and containing features from Riky Rick, and a variety of other artists. The album was nominated at 27th South African Music Awards as Best Hip Hop album.

In 2021, it was announced that Boity had closed a recording deal with Def Jam Africa. She was the first to mention it on Twitter. On August 19, 2021, she announced her upcoming single "The yano way" on Instagram. The song will features Daliwonga and Felo.

== Other ventures ==
In 2016, she collaborated with Sissy-Boy for a jean collection which was predicted to be about "being sexy and celebrating curves". Thulo continued her venture with Sissy-Boy as they released a new collection in July 2018.

In 2018, she partnered with Impulse SA in creating limited edition fragrances. She also graced the cover of Cosmopolitan SA for the September issue.

Business

In 2021 Boity announced the launch of her new beverage alcohol and non-alcohol drinks. The BT signature.

== Personal life ==
=== Relationships ===
Thulo had previously dated rapper Cassper Nyovest and are seen as having an on-again, off-again relationship. The pair got engaged but then they called off their engagement and ended their relationship in December 2015. In October 2021, Thulo was hospitalised after she had a fight with Bujy Bikwa.

== Honours ==
=== Forbes Africa 30 Under 30 creatives ===
In July 2019, Thulo was named by the Forbes magazine amongst the 30 under 30 creatives category list for her contribution to the music and entertainment sector, the list featured other young African creatives like Nigerian musician Burna Boy, South African actress, TV and radio personality Thando Thabethe, Ghanaian contemporary artist Joseph Awuah-Darko, also known as Okuntakinte and Kenyan film director, producer and screenwriter Njue Kevin.

== Filmography ==
=== Television ===
Year	Title	Role	Notes
2011	4 Play- Sex Tips For Girls	Lindi	7 episodes
2011	Crib Notes	Presenter	Host
2011	The Media Career Guide	Herself	Co-host
2011	Turn It Out: Street Battle	Herself	Guest judge
2012	Zoned	Herself	Co-host
2013	10 Over 10	Herself	Commentator
2013	Turn It Out	Herself	Guest judge
2013	19th Annual South African Music Awards	Herself	Co-host
2013	ScreenTime with Nicky Greenwall	Herself	Special guest
2013	Big Brother Africa	Herself	Online insert presenter
2014	I Love South Africa	Herself	Contestant
2014	Rolling With... Celeb Edition	Herself	Special guest
2014	Strictly Come Dancing SA	Herself	Contestant
2014	Reality Check	Herself	Presenter
2014	My Perfect Family	Trisha	Guest cast
2014	Tongue in Check	Herself	Host
2015	Club 808	Herself	Co-host
2016	The Close-Up	Herself	Guest
2016	Lip Sync Battle Africa	Herself	Contestant; Episode 1
2016	Ridiculousness Africa	Herself	Co-host
2016	High Rollers	Charity	Cast
2017	Rhythm City	Luscious Lu	Guest role
2017	Change Down	Herself	Host
2018	Massive Music	Herself	Guest
2019	Celeb Feasts with Zola	Herself	Guest
2020	"Own Your Throne"	Herself	

=== Film ===
Year	Title	Role	Notes
2012	Taxi Ride	Deja	Television Film
2014	Dear Betty	Betty	
2016	Mrs Right Guy	Marie	

== Discography ==
=== EPs ===
Title	Type	Album details	Certification
4436	EP	Release date: 2020; Label: Universal Music South Africa; Formats: Digital download	TBA

=== Singles ===
Title	Year
"Wuz Dat?" (With Nasty C)	2018
"Bakae"	2019
"Switch it up " (With Lioness and Nazizi)	2019
"Original Recipe (Remix)" (Stogie T featuring Boity)	2019
"Utatakho (Remix)" (Yanga Chief featuring Riky Rick, Dee Koala & Boity)	2019
"Thembi" (Costa Titch featuring Boity)	2020
"018's Finest" (Featuring Maglera Doe Boy)	2020
"Own Your Throne"

== Awards and nominations ==
Year	Award ceremony	Work/Recipient	Category	Result	Ref.
2018	South African Hip Hop Awards	"Wuz Dat?" (featuring Nasty C)	Best Collaboration	Won	
2020	South African Hip Hop Awards	Utatakho Remix	Best Collaboration	Nominated	
2020	South African Hip Hop Awards	Utatakho Remix	Best Remix	Won	
2020	South African Hip Hop Awards	Utatakho Remix	Song Of The Year	Nominated	
2021	South African Hip Hop Awards	Herself	Best Female	Won	
2021	South African Hip Hop Awards	Herself	Freshman of the Year	Nominated	
2021	South African Hip Hop Awards	Herself	MVP/Hustler of the Year	Nominated	
2021	South African Hip Hop Awards	4436	Mixtape of the Year	Nominated	
2021	South African Music Awards	4436	Best Hip Hop Album	Nominated	
2021	People's Choice Awards	Herself	African Social Star	Nominated	
2021	African Muzik Magazine Awards	Herself	Personality of the Year	Won	
