= Joseph Awuah-Darko =

Ghanaian musician and artist (born 1996)

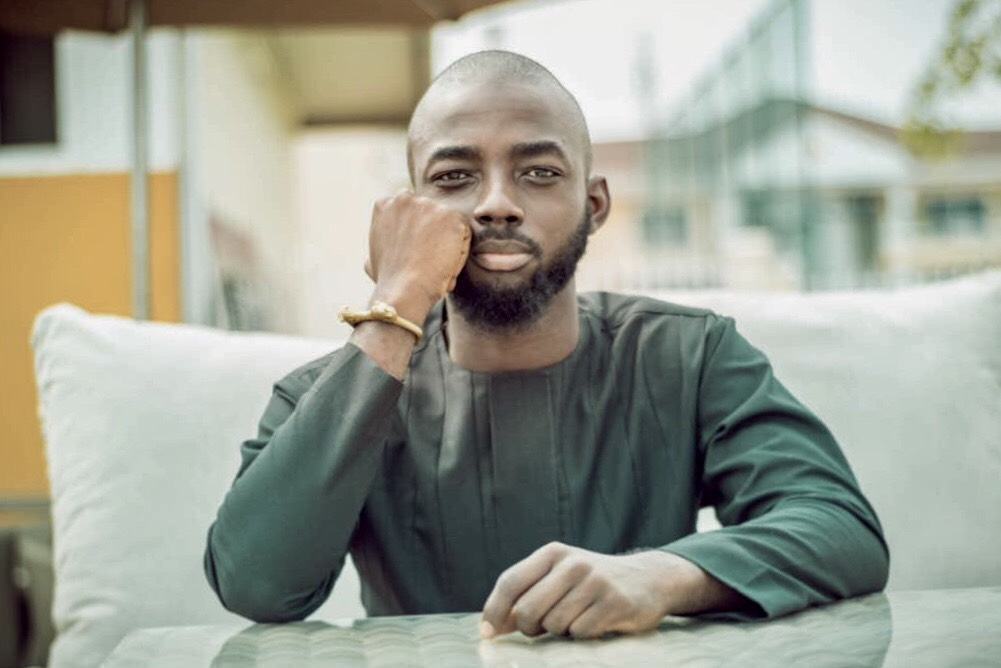

Background information
- Also known as: Okuntakinte
- Born: Joseph Nana Kwame Awuah-Darko; 31 August 1996 (age 30); Middlesex, London, England
- Genre: Afro-EDM
- Occupations: social entrepreneur, contemporary African artist, philanthropist
- Years active: 2015–present

Joseph Nanana Kwame Awoah Darko, also known as Okuntakinte, is a Ghanaian artist, and social media personality. He started a music career professionally in late 2015 He has also founded several African art initiatives and faced a lawsuit in connection with these projects. In 2024, he announced via Instagram his intention to pursue assisted euthanasia in the Netherlands, citing his bipolar disorder, and launched his Last Supper Project, asking to have dinner with friends and strangers to celebrate human connection as he counted down to the end of his life. In July of 2025, he started to hint on Instagram that he no longer plans on pursuing assisted euthanasia. He now posts as an advocate as an SA survivor with a new outlook on life following the Last Supper Project.

== Early life and education ==
Awuah-Darko was born in Middlesex, London on 31 August 1996. When he was five, his family moved to Ghana. He attended Ghana International School (GIS), where he grew into his love for music. While a student there, he was selected to sing the national anthem of Ghana, God Bless Our Homeland Ghana for the visit of then-US President George W. Bush in 2008. In 2009, he also went on to star in a GIS school production of 'The Music Man' at the National Theatre of Ghana. For his role, he was given the GIS school production award for the 'Most Versatile Actor'. Joseph graduated from Ashesi University in Ghana where he studied business administration and liberal arts.

== Music career ==
His musical influences and artistic influences include Nat King-Cole, Amy Winehouse and Fela Kuti. Prior to moving into music, Awuah-Darko was also doing abstract art, coincidentally he met his manager Meister through that.

On 29 January 2016, Joseph released his music video Melanin Girls, which garnered a lot of media attention. It also sparked an intriguing social media campaign which encouraged dark-skinned girls to post photos of themselves with the possibility of winning a thousand Ghana Cedis.

The song served as an anti-bleaching campaign and attracted interest even from BBC World Service presenter Nuala McGovern who went on to feature the young artiste on BBC Outside Source. He also went on release songs Black Magic, DeCoco, Summer of X and Bila Majina. He has collaborated with South African artiste Moonchild Sanelly on a remix of Melanin Girls to develop more awareness about the dangers of skin bleaching. And he looks forward to working with other artists like Mr. Eazi and M.anifest and Efya.

In 2016, he signed a publishing deal with Sony ATV in South Africa who also have artists like D'banj on their shoulders.

=== Singles ===
- Melanin Girls (2016)
- Black Magic (2016)
- DeCoco (ft Worlasi and Miss B. Redd) (2016)
- Summer of X (2016)
- Melanin Girls Remix (featuring Moonchild Sanelly)
- Bila Majina (ft Adomaa)

=== Performances ===
He performed at the 2016 annual Sabolai Radio Festival. The same year in July he also performed at the Kristal Bar in Accra.

== Art initiatives and philanthropy work ==
=== The Agbogblo Shine Initiative ===
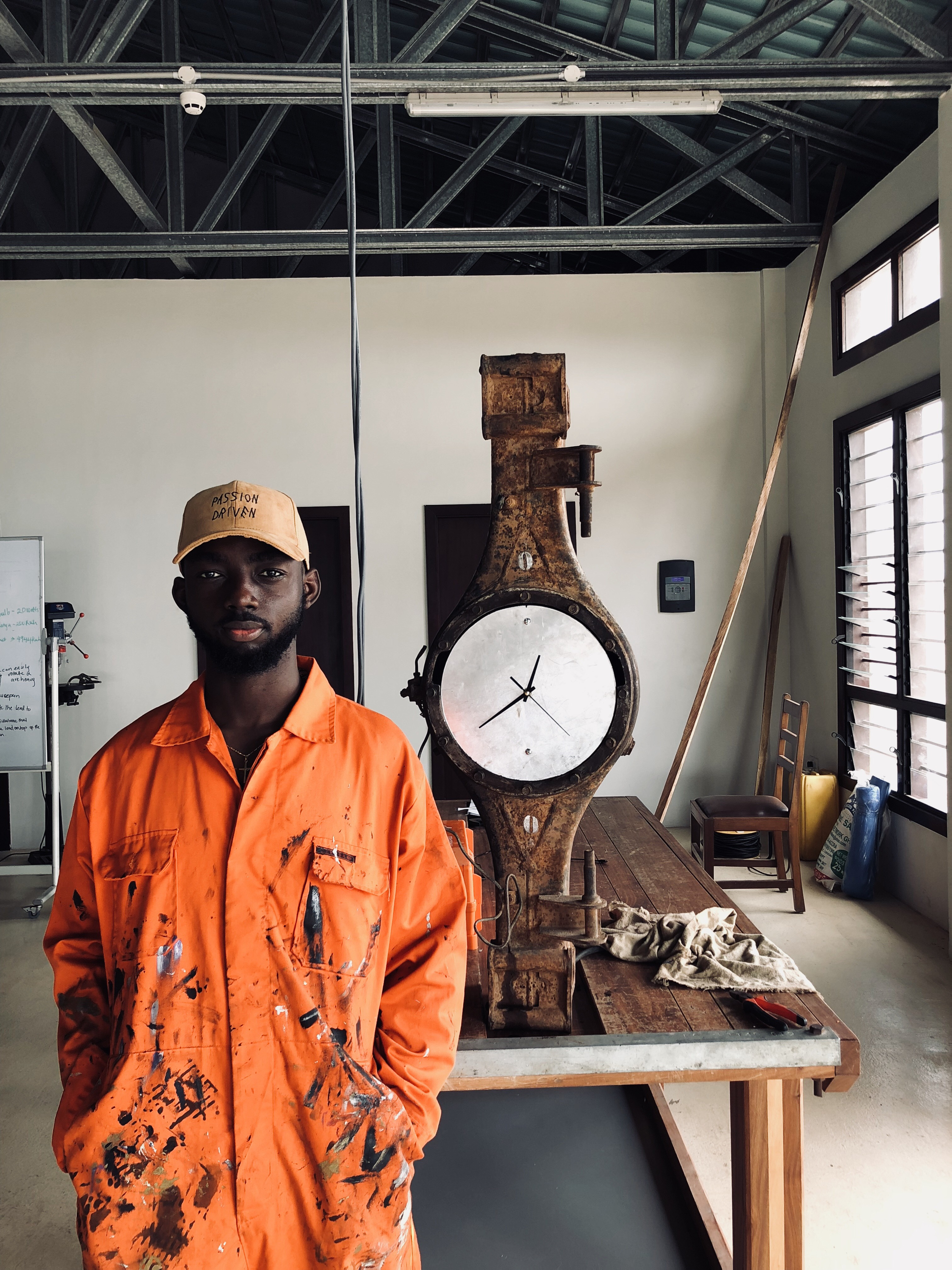
Joseph Nana Kwame Awuah-Darko also known as Okuntakinte at The Agbogblo Shine Initiative

Awuah-Darko along with Cynthia Muhonja a fellow student from Ashesi University, co-founded a non-profit organization called The Agbogblo Shine Initiative in January 2017, which “seeks of fund social enterprises and projects dedicated to applying design thinking to solve problems regarding e-waste.” He started this initiative with several Ashesi students and with the aim of turning e-waste found at the Agbogbloshie dump site into high-end furniture. For his efforts in climate action and environmental conservation he earned recognition across the globe.

“The main focus of my work is to shed light on how human beings need to change how they treat the environment, and that is why these three themes – consumerism, capitalism and climate action— are captured in my work,”

— Joseph Awuah-Darko, Face2Face Africa

In March 2018, Awuah-Darko and co founder Cynthia Muhonja, along with their team, were provided a $6,900 grant by the Ford Foundation. The money was spent on 50 folding stools built by them from low cost durable materials and 400 cupcakes from Eat By Zoe to pupils in the Old Ningo Basic School in Accra as part of the Agbogblo Shine Initiative with support from the Ford foundation grant and the Ashesi university Student Fund.

Awuah Darko hosted a solo art exhibition at Accra's Gallery 1957 in February 2019, some of the works he exhibited were sculptor pieces which had been made from e-waste collected from the Agbogbloshie dump site along with other art pieces created using 3D printers from the Ashesi University lab.

=== Noldor Artist Residency ===
In 2020, Awuah-Darko founded Ghana's first independent artist residency programme, Noldor Artist Residency and the Museum Institute of Ghana. The idea behind the residency is to invite one emerging African artist each autumn to the art studio space and retreat in Accra, Ghana and to help these trained African artists who have limited access to artistic resources nurture their skills technically, whilst supporting them to flourish both amongst the growing local collector base and on the global contemporary art scene. The Nolder artist residency is to support emerging African artists. Recently, the institute has come under fire for withholding hundreds of thousands of dollars in payment from artists.

=== Other interests ===
Awuah-Darko starred in the documentary 'It's Okay' released on 18 May 2018 in which he talked about mental health in Africa.

== Awards and honours ==
=== Most Promising Social Entrepreneur ===
Awuah-Darko was invited to go to the London School of Economics Africa Summit along with Ghanaian president Nana Akufo-Addo to talk on the Agbogblo Shine Initiative and his entrepreneurial works. He was selected as one of the ''21 Emerging African Contemporary Artists'' by the Mastercard Foundation in their publication, 'Hope, Energy and Ingenuity'.

Awuah-Darko became the youngest person in history to be recognised by the West African Business Excellence Awards and was awarded "Most Promising Social Entrepreneur" in May 2018.

=== Forbes Africa 30 Under 30 creatives ===
In 2019 he was named by the Forbes magazine amongst the 30 under 30 creatives category list for his contribution to the Contemporary Art sector, the list featured other young African creatives like Nigerian musician Burna Boy, South African model, TV personality and rapper Boity Thulo and Kenyan film director, producer and screenwriter Njue Kevin. He was part of the four Ghanaians who made the list.

== Personal life ==
In May 2024, Awuah-Darko claimed that he had been sexually assaulted twice in June 2021 by artist Kehinde Wiley during and after a dinner event in Ghana. Awuah-Darko claimed that he was first "inappropriately groped" shortly after meeting Wiley, and then was subject to a "much more severe and violent" assault later that day. Awuah-Darko said that he had not initially recognized the incident as assault and that he had not reported it due to attitudes toward LGBT rights in Ghana. Awuah-Darko also used his Instagram account to share testimonials from others who corroborated his allegations. He also instituted a campaign to raise $200,000 in "projected legal fees" in a prior March 2024 instagram post that had referenced alleged sexual assault allegations without naming any names.

Wiley denied the accusations, stating that the two had been in a "brief, consensual relationship". Lawyers for Wiley sent Awuah-Darko a cease and desist letter demanding the removal of his "categorically false and defamatory" Instagram posts. Wiley posted screenshots on his social media of alleged text conversations between the two men, in which Awuah-Darko asked to meet Wiley again and expressed a desire to visit him at his home in New York. He further alleged that in the months subsequent Awuah-Darko had flown to his (Wiley's) birthday party in Lagos. Wiley's representatives also shared the series of text messages with news outlets.

In July 2025, while traveling to Berlin for an invited Last Supper, he was stopped at the Polish border because he lacked citizenship or visa documents, and he is now seeking asylum there. Earlier that month, he announced his engagement to Alexandré Zii Miller, whom he met at a dinner party he threw with a friend. Following the engagement, he started to hint on Instagram through reels asking "So you changed your mind?" that he no longer wants to pursue assisted euthanasia and later by replying to comments, clearly stating that he does not pursue it for now.

== Alleged financial misconduct ==
In July 2024, the influential art world website ArtNet published a story on a lawsuit brought against Awuah-Darko by up and coming Ghanaian artist, Foster Sakyiamah. "The accusations follow previous concerns surrounding speculation at the Noldor Artist Residency, founded by Awuah-Darko." Sakyiamah claimed that $266,527.03 worth of funds from the sale of his artwork by Awuah-Darko had not been paid to him. Court documents reportedly confirmed that Noldor Residency, founded by Awuah-Darko, owed Sakyiamah this amount.

Subsequent to this, on December 3, 2024, AfrikMag published an article alleging that Joseph had withheld funds from the sales of works by artists under the Noldor residency program. Seth Fiifi, another artist and Foster's brother, stated that Awuah-Darko made repeated unfulfilled promises regarding payment. The AfrikMag report also mentioned three additional artists—Ishmael Armah, Elizabeth Sakyiamah (Foster's sister), and an unnamed individual—who allegedly did not receive payments for their work. AfrikMag contacted Awuah-Darko for a statement, but he declined to comment. This story was also reported on by credible news outlets in Ghana such as Joy News, which posted an article containing alleged recorded voice conversations between Awuah-Darko and Foster Skyiamah. In the recordings he appeared to acknowledge the debt and made various promises to make efforts to pay.

In an article published by Dutch newspaper de Volkskrant on 3rd June 2025 however, Awuah-Darko appeared unrepentant, accusing the artists of "greed" and stating that they intended to "extort" him "because he comes from a wealthy family". He also pointed out that his parents were handling his legal fees.

On December 13, 2024, a user on X, OleleSalvador, posted screenshots of WhatsApp chats between Joseph Awuah-Darko and several Ghanaian artists. The chats allegedly show Awuah-Darko discussing unpaid funds owed to the artists. The post highlights accusations that Awuah-Darko withheld over $350,000 from artists, including Foster Sakyiamah, who is suing for $266,527.03. The controversy stems from an Afrikmag investigation titled "Gallery of Greed," which details claims of financial exploitation through Awuah-Darko’s Noldor Residency.

In subsequent developments, users on X (formerly Twitter) noted that Awuah-Darko had blocked accounts questioning his failure to pay the artists, suggesting an intent to suppress discussion of the allegations. As of March 7, 2025, no further legal resolutions or statements from Joseph have been publicly reported.

== Euthanasia controversy and the Last Supper project ==
On December 6, 2024, Awuah-Darko publicly announced via Instagram his intention to pursue assisted euthanasia in the Netherlands, scheduled for July 30, 2025. The announcement came shortly after allegations surfaced on December 3, 2024, regarding his withholding of funds from artists associated with his Noldor Residency program, as reported by AfrikMag.

He also announced what became known as the Last Supper project: sharing intimate dinners with friends and strangers as a celebration of human connection as his life neared its supposed end. He wrote, "For the next few months, I'd like anyone who is willing to invite me over to prepare their favourite meal for dinner. We'll break bread with friends and loved ones, and I'll bring post-its, board games, origami, and fellowship with no judgment." Since then, he has had more than 150 meals with volunteer hosts.

Awuah-Darko has openly discussed his struggles with what he termed "treatment-resistant bipolar disorder", citing it as the reason for his euthanasia decision, which would require a four-year approval process under Dutch law. In recent months however this narrative has been called into question, as he admitted to the Dutch de Volkskrant newspaper in June 2025 that he had not in fact started the euthanasia application process. He commented further that he had not seen a psychiatrist or taken any medication for his condition in 3 years, since trying lithium which "had not agreed with him".

=== Public Reaction ===
While The Last Supper Project has been praised by some as a heartfelt endeavor, it has faced criticism, particularly in Ghana. Critics, including voices on social media platforms like X, have accused Awuah-Darko of using the initiative to deflect attention from the unpaid artists, who are collectively owed significant sums, including $266,527.03 to Foster Sakyiamah as confirmed in legal proceedings. Some have labeled the project a "scam" or an attempt to garner global sympathy amid the financial misconduct allegations. On April 20, 2025, Awuah-Darko addressed the claims on Instagram stating they were being handled in court.

More seriously, several health experts and organisations such as Bipolar UK, according to an article by de Volkskrant, have cited serious concerns about the way in which Awuah-Darko posts about assisted suicide in Holland, saying the apparent romanticization of this stringent process could lead to misunderstanding and potential harm for vulnerable followers of his account.
