= The Captain of Nakara =

- Film poster
- Directed by: Bob Nyanja
- Written by: Catejan Boy; Martin Thau
- Produced by: Oliver Thau; Mario Zvan
- Starring: Charles Bukeko; Patrick Oketch; Veronica Waceke; Joseph Olita
- Cinematography: Helmut Fischer
- Music by: Jan Tilman Schade
- Production companies: Blue Sky Films; Papermoon Films; Scopas Medien
- Distributed by: TRACE Content Distribution
- Release date: 10 February 2012 (United States)
- Running time: 87 minutes
- Country: Kenya
- Languages: English; Swahili
- Budget: €700,000

The Captain of Nakara is a 2012 Kenyan comedy film. It is an adaption of the German play The Captain of Köpenick by Carl Zuckmayer, itself based on the life story of Wilhelm Voigt, a small-time criminal who posed as a Hauptmann (Captain) in Berlin in 1906.

== Plot ==
The small-time thug Muntu (Bernard Safari) has just been released from prison in the fictional African country of Nakara. Shortly after, he falls in love with a preacher's daughter, and loathes to tell her of his dark past. He therefore pretends to be a successful businessman. He poses as the owner of a successful market stand. Because of the pervasive corruption in the area, his sincere attempts to make his falsehoods a reality fall flat. In a stolen military uniform, Muntu poses as the "Captain of Nakara" and successfully defends his rights and happiness, leading to changes not only for him, but also for the whole nation ultimately winning the presidency of Kwetu!

== Cast ==
- Bernard Safari as Muntu
- Shirleen Wangari as Muna
- Charles Kiarie as Sunday
- Charles Bukeko as General Lumumba
- Patrick Oketch as Captain
- Joel Otukho as Ballad Monger
- Lucy Wangui Gichomo as Civil Servant
- Ephraim Muriithi as Fence
- Evans Muthini as Jailor
- Anne Njathi as Waguyu
- Veronica Waceke as Shop Assistant
- Jim Were as Kiosk Owner
- Joseph Olita (uncredited) as Muntu's father-in-law

== Nominations ==
The film was nominated in the 2012 Africa Movie Academy Awards (AMAA) under the Achievement in Costume Design category.

Captain of Nakara was also nominated for the Free Spirit competition at the Warsaw Film festival in 2012.

A year later, in 2013, the film was nominated in the Pan African Film and Television Festival of Ouagadougou (FESPACO) under the Digital Video Fiction Competition category. The category had 17 nominees drawn from across Africa. It was the only nomination from Kenya in this category.
