= Jason Corder =

American actor

Jason Corder (born 1969) is an American TV and film producer, scriptwriter, actor, singer and composer, and CEO of his own production company, Corder Productions, with offices in Los Angeles and Nairobi, Kenya.

Corder lived in Nairobi, Kenya, from 2008 to 2019. While there, he created Kenya's first ever comedy-drama series, "Stay," which won a Kalasha award in 2014 and now airs on AfroLandTV, Peacock and Roku.

He is known for playing Donald John in the web series Oh-Bama (2016–2017). He also played Shane in the television series Stay (2013-2014), which he also created. Corder also appeared in the short film Intellectual Scum (2015).

Corder grew up in Marin County, California. He moved to Kenya in 2008, initially to teach art at the University of Nairobi. He is the father of three sons.

== Select filmography ==
- The Rugged Priest (2011)
- The Lion Standing in the Wind (2015)
- Intellectual Scum (2015)
