= 18 Hours =

- Official Poster
- Directed by: Njue Kevin
- Written by: Njue Kevin
- Produced by: Phoebe Ruguru Bill Jones Afwani
- Starring: Nick Ndeda; Brian Ogola; Sue Wanjiru
- Edited by: Mark Maina
- Music by: Jacktone Okore
- Production company: Rocque Pictures
- Release date: 10 November 2017
- Running time: 70 minutes
- Country: Kenya
- Languages: English; Sheng; Swahili

18 Hours is a 2017 Kenyan drama film written and directed by Njue Kevin on his directorial debut. The cast includes Nick Ndeda, Sue Wanjiru, Brian Ogola, Isaya Evans and Shirleen Wangari.

The film "follows a rookie paramedic who survives 18 hours in an ambulance for the life of a road accident casualty who is denied admission into hospital." The film, made history as being the first Kenyan picture to be nominated for the Best Overall film at the Africa Magic Viewers Choice Awards (AMVCA) bagging 4 other nominations in the 2018 awards.

== Plot ==
Loosely based on the real-life paramedic Brian Odhiambo, the story gives a positive perspective on the healthcare system and that of a medic who will do whatever it takes to save the life of a patient.

Zach works for Raven paramedics services. His job is to handle emergency cases. An emergency call comes in from a witness about an accident that has happened along a Highway. A pedestrian has been involved in a high speed hit and run while on his way home from work.

Assigned head of the rescue, Zach and his driver Mark dash out of their base and in about 20 minutes, they arrive at the scene. The casualty is bleeding from the head and not moving.

Zach and Mark get the casualty into their ambulance and soon after, they are on their way to different hospitals. Joined by Sabina (the casualty victim’s wife), they each take turns watching over the casualty as they ensure he has sufficient oxygen all the time. Zack is determined to keep the accident victim alive, 18 hours after the accident.

== Cast ==
- Nick Ndeda
- Sue Wanjiru
- Brian Ogola
- Achar Brian
- Junniah W Kariithi
- shirleen Wangari
- Ruth Maingi
- Brenda Wairimu

== Production ==
The inspiration of the film began back in 2015 when Njue Kevin, the writer & director, read an article on the newspaper. It was a story inspired by a real-life tragedy, where a man bled in an ambulance for 18 hours because Kenyatta National Hospital claimed it did not have an ICU bed. And that’s when we started playing around with the idea that this can be a powerful film; a film that can entertain but also be used for social change. Producer, Phoebe Ruguru was then attached and the script development began with speaking to several doctors and emergency technicians who were fully immersed and involved with the project throughout. It's a medical thriller, so we had to be true to the medical fraternity, Njue told BBC World service.

The casting process was open to the public and involved Kenyan actors even though the production received applications from actors across the globe including some from LA, Hollywood, London, and Germany. The casting call was put online and received 1000 applicants with only 25 making it to the film. After the writing, Njue hired a storyboard artist and camped 4 weeks in his apartment in Nairobi where they made sketches and images to visually tell the story.

== Release ==
18 Hours opened to theatres across East Africa on 10 November 2017 to a sold out premier. A number of media personalities graced the launch including Kenyan athlete David Rudisha, who was involved in the marketing campaign to advocate for better emergency response in Kenya.

The film was positively received in Kenya with reviews highlighting the audacity of Njue Kevin and his team to make the 18 Hours movie.
