= Joseph Olita =

Kenyan actor (1944–2014)

- Born: Joseph Ogola Olita; 31 March 1944
- Died: 1 June 2014 (aged 70)
- Citizenship: Kenyan
- Occupation: Actor
- Notable work: Rise and Fall of Idi Amin
- Children: 12
- Mother: Regina Oduma

Joseph Ogola Olita (31 March 1944 – 1 June 2014) was a Kenyan actor who was best known for portraying Idi Amin in Rise and Fall of Idi Amin (1981) and Mississippi Masala (1991).

== Early life and education ==
Joseph Ogola Olita was born on 31 March 1944 to mother Regina Oduma. In 1951, Olita attended Pap Oriang Primary School. In 1958, he enrolled at St. Mary's Yala where he went for his O level and was an active drama club member.

After completing his secondary education, Olita was an employee of the Brooke Bond Company in Kericho and the Union Carbide in Nakuru. Olita was a deeply spiritual man having attended Barding Secondary School, between 1956 and 1960, and later proceeded to Yala Seminary School. Olita was working for USAID when the opportunity to act in 1981's Rise and Fall of Idi Amin presented itself.

== Acting career ==
According to NTV Uganda, Olita did not know much about Amin, so he "read a lot about him through books, through newspapers and the clips." He missed the chance to act as him when he was approached to portray the role in the 1976 film, Victory at Entebbe. When it came time to portray him in Rise and Fall, "I really had to master his mannerisms." Rise and Fall of Idi Amin won five awards, including Best Actor, at the Las Vegas International Film Festival. Olita not receiving an Oscar nomination for his performance has been considered one of the worst acting snubs in the history of the Academy Awards. "You see these wazungu are so selfish. They just wanted to make one of their own a star. (Forest) Whitaker’s performance and role in The Last King of Scotland is nowhere close to what I did and still able to do," says Olita.

In 1984, Olita portrayed the minor role of the First Policeman in Sheena. In 1991, he reprised his role as Amin for the second and final time in Mississippi Masala which also starred Denzel Washington. Olita also portrayed an army general in The Black Forest Clinic.

Olita's final screen appearance was in the 2011 romantic comedy, The Captain of Nakara, in which he portrayed Muntu’s father in-law.

== Life after acting ==
Olita was also an activist and a humanitarian. In 1998, he founded the Galamoro Network, a non-government organization that focused on raising awareness on HIV/AIDS.

Following the election of Barack Obama as the first African-American to be President of the United States in 2008, Olita founded a tour company named ”Kogelo gallamoro tours” which took opportunity of the foreign visitors who kept pouring into Obama’s ancestral home town, Kogelo.

Olita was also the author of two books. One of them is a book on nutrition titled Health is Wealth.

In July 2013, Olita was spotted on the streets of Nairobi selling unlicensed copies of his movies.

Before his death, Olita was staying in Uganda where he was selling electrical appliances.

== Personal life and death ==
In 1980, while Olita was working in his well known role playing Idi Amin, he wrote a letter to the real Amin requesting to meet him but Amin never responded.

In a 2013 interview, Olita described himself as a born-again Christian. He also admitted to have had three wives as well as having fathered eight sons and four daughters. One of his wives died from diabetes.

Olita died on 1 June 2014 at his rural home in Pap Oriang’ in South East Alego of the Siaya District at the age of 70 after succumbing to high blood pressure. He had reportedly returned home on the day before from Nairobi, where he had been living after the funeral of his mother. According to his brother, Matthews Ogola, Olita was suffering from arthritis, diabetes and high blood pressure at the time of his death. Despite his stardom from Rise and Fall of Idi Amin, Olita died a poor man.

According to Sipross Odero, a relative of Olita, his body was removed to Bama Private Hospital mortuary. A funeral committee has been set up in his home village chaired by the South Alego Ward representative Joshua Osuri. Along with his aforementioned living relatives, Olita is survived by one wife, by the name of Alice Atieno, and several children including daughter Risper Odero, and grandchildren.

== Select filmography ==
- Rise and Fall of Idi Amin (1981) - Idi Amin
- Sheena (1984) - 1st Policeman
- The Mines of Kilimanjaro (1986) - Tribe Chief (uncredited)
- Mississippi Masala (1991) - Idi Amin (Last appearance)
- The Captain of Nakara (2012) - Muntu's father-in-law
