= Denis Hills =

British writer and academic (1913–2004)

Denis Cecil Hills (8 November 1913 – 26 April 2004) was a British author, teacher, traveller and adventurer. He came to international prominence in 1975 while he was living in Uganda and was sentenced to death for espionage and sedition following comments about President Idi Amin in a book which Hills wrote. After Amin rebuffed appeals for clemency by Queen Elizabeth II, Hills was released and allowed to return to the UK following the intervention of the British government.

== Biography ==
Hills was born in the Birmingham suburb of Moseley. He attended King Edward's School, Birmingham before going on to Lincoln College, Oxford in 1932, where he read Philosophy, Politics and Economics. In 1935, he left Oxford to travel through Germany, funding himself by writing for the Birmingham Post.

Returning to England, Hills worked briefly at Shell-Mex & BP before moving to Poland in 1937 as English editor of a cultural magazine. Hills' book Return to Poland showed his fascination with pre-war Poland, and in 1939 he moved to Warsaw to teach English. At the outbreak of war, he moved to Romania where Hills worked with the British Council. He was for a time seconded to General Kopański's Polish Carpathian Lancers Brigade, and then to the King's Own Royal Regiment. Polish-speaking, he joined the 5th Kresowa Division in Iraq and Palestine before being sent to Italy in 1944.

In 1944, Hills served as an officer of the British Eighth Army in Italy. He fought with the Polish Carpathian Lancers Brigade and the King's Own Royal Regiment in the Second World War. After the Battle of Monte Cassino, he was involved with the implementation of the Yalta Agreement on the repatriation of Soviet citizens after World War II. Norman Davies in his book Europe: A History and Aleksandr Solzhenitsyn in The Gulag Archipelago recognised Hills's part in this. These papers contain correspondence that Hills had with Nikolai Tolstoy, Professor Hugh Trevor-Roper, Lord Bethell and many others together with Public Record Office documents. Hills took a similarly independent line over the question of the SS Fede, a decrepit hulk which was anchored off La Spezia and crammed with 1,200 Polish Jews, survivors of the Holocaust who were determined to make their way to Palestine in the face of a British blockade and quota restrictions on Jewish immigration. The Jews were already on hunger strike, and their leaders were threatening to blow up the boat if the British refused to allow them to sail. Hills persuaded the authorities to look the other way as the Fede raised anchor, an episode immortalized by Leon Uris in his novel Exodus.

When the war was over, Hills became an interpreter and liaison officer with the Soviet military mission at Taranto. After being demobilized, he taught English in Germany and restless by nature cycled from the Arctic Circle to Salonika in Greece. In 1955 he moved to Turkey teaching English in Ankara before becoming an instructor at the Technical University.

In 1963 Hills moved to Uganda. He was teaching at Makerere University in Kampala when Idi Amin seized power in 1971. Hills spoke out regarding Amin in the book he was writing, The White Pumpkin, and was arrested in April 1975, charged with espionage and sedition. Tried before a military tribunal chaired by Juma Butabika, he was condemned to death by firing squad for referring to the dictator as a 'black Nero' and a 'village tyrant'. Queen Elizabeth II interceded on Hills' behalf, and the then-Foreign Secretary, James Callaghan, flew out to Kampala to bring Hills home. In 1981 Hills played himself in the film Rise and Fall of Idi Amin. The incident was alluded to by Welsh comedian Max Boyce in his tribute song to the Rugby legends known as the Pontypool Front Row, "We've had trouble in Uganda, with President Amin/We had to send an envoy with a message from the Queen/To stay the execution, but Amin answered "No"/Until a card was sent from the Viet Gwent – the Pontypool Front Row".

Hills returned to Africa in 1976, travelling through Southern Rhodesia, which was the subject of his book The Last Days of White Rhodesia. In 1982 he taught in Nairobi.

In 1985 Hills returned to Poland but was summarily expelled as a result of a piece in The Daily Telegraph's Peterborough column, in which he was described as travelling through Poland in order to write a "less than complimentary book about the Communist regime".

Hills had a daughter, actress Gillian Hills, by his first wife Dunia Leśmian, daughter of Polish symbolist poet Bolesław Leśmian, and two sons by his second wife Ingrid Jan.

== Books ==
- My Travels in Turkey (London: George Allen & Unwin, 1964)
- Man with a Lobelia Flute (London: George Allen & Unwin, 1969)
- The White Pumpkin (London: George Allen and Unwin, 1976)
- Rebel People (London: G. Allen & Unwin, 1978)
- The Last Days of White Rhodesia (London: Chatto & Windus, 1981)
- The Rock of the Wind: a return to Africa (London: Deutsch, 1984)
- Return to Poland (London: The Bodley Head, 1988)
- Tyrants and Mountains: a reckless life (London: John Murray Publishers, 1992)
