= Bob Nyanja =

Kenyan filmmaker

- Citizenship: Kenyan
- Occupation: Filmmaker
- Known for: Directing the film Malooned!

Bob Nyanja is a Kenyan filmmaker. He is known for directing the film Malooned! (2007). He also directed the films The Rugged Priest (2011) and The Captain of Nakara (2012). Nyanja is also the chairman of the Kenyan Film and Television Producers Association.

== Filmography ==
- Malooned! (2007)
- The Rugged Priest (2011)
- The Captain of Nakara (2012)

== Awards ==
He won a Kalasha for Best Director at the 3rd Kalasha International Film & TV Awards.
