= Intellectual Scum =

- Theatrical release poster
- Directed by: Njue Kevin
- Screenplay by: Njue Kevin
- Story by: Field Ruwe
- Produced by: Bill Jones Afwani; Phoebe Ruguru
- Starring: Jason Corder; Patrick Oketch
- Cinematography: Jim Bishop
- Edited by: Daniel Kent
- Production company: Rocque Pictures
- Release dates: 15 June 2015 (Zanzibar International Film Festival); 1 October 2015
- Running time: 15 minutes
- Country: Kenya

Intellectual Scum is a 2015 Kenyan short film directed by Njue Kevin. Produced by Rocque Pictures, the film is an adaptation of the controversial article 'You Lazy (Intellectual) African Scum!' by Field Ruwe, a Zambian-American writer.

== Plot ==
On board a commercial airplane, an African intellectual (Field Ruwe), sits next to a white man (Walter). In their conversation, which is utterly brutal, honest and to some racist, Walter blames the ‘Intellectuals’ for the deplorable state Africa was in.

== Cast ==
- Jason Corder as Walter
- Patrick Oketch as Field Ruwe
- Kevin Samuel as the analyst
- Mkamzee Mwatela as the moderator
- Edward Kagure as the thief
- Niki Behr as the flight attendant

== Production ==
Principal photography on the film began on 15 November 2015 and ended on 20 November 2015. The plane sequence on the film was shot on an actual plane at Wilson airport as opposed to creating a set on a sound stage.

The director, Njue Kevin, on this decision said, "We would have used twice the budget on a set other than the actual airport. When on a shoestring budget, you have to do what you have to do."

== Accolades ==
Intellectual Scum has been met with widespread critical acclaim. Screening in three continents across the globe, critics across the east African region plod it as being the most successful short film in the history of film in Kenya.

It has screened at the following festivals thus far:

1. Silicon Valley African Film Festival 2015, CA, USA.
2. Film Africa 2015, United Kingdom.
3. Africa international film festival, 2015. Nigeria - Student shorts - screened.
4. Africa Film Festival "Out of Europe" in Cologne/Germany.
5. Cork Africa Film festival 2015, Ireland.
6. Afrika Film festival 2016, Belgium.
7. Luxor African film festival 2016, Egypt.
8. Cameroon International Film Festival, 2016.
9. Out of Africa Film festival 2015, Kenya.
10. The Zanzibar International Film Festival 2015.
11. Slum Film festival, 2015. Kenya - Judges Choice Awards -*Winner-
12. Golden Diana awards, 2015. Austria
13. Kalasha Film and Television awards 2015, Kenya.-Best Feature by a student- Nominated

== History ==
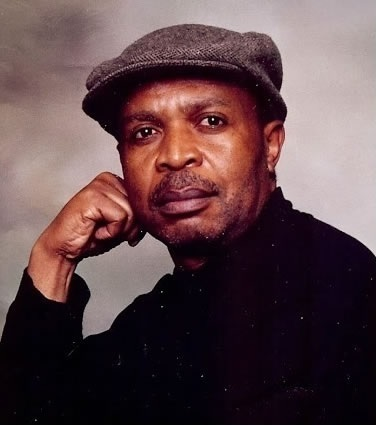
Field Ruwe (2014)

On January 13, 2012, Zambian writer Field Ruwe published "Hunt for Successor 8: Zambian Intellectuals are Lazy". It was subsequently updated on January 16, 2012 on UKZAMBIANS, a Zambian news and lifestyle magazine. It tells the story of a conversation between an African man and a Caucasian man on board a commercial aircraft. In their conversation, Walter blames the "intellectuals" for the deplorable state of Africa.

It was later retitled "You Lazy (Intellectual) African Scum!" by Ghanaian-American novelist and blogger Malaka Grant, appearing in her blog "Mind of Malaka" on 18 January 2012, and subsequently went viral, being re-posted on other blogs and online forums.
