= Rise and Fall of Idi Amin =

- Film poster
- Directed by: Sharad Patel
- Written by: Wade Huie
- Produced by: Sharad Patel
- Starring: Joseph Olita; Thomas Baptiste; Leonard Trolley; Denis Hills
- Cinematography: Harvey Harrison
- Edited by: Keith Palmer
- Music by: Christopher Gunning
- Distributed by: International Film Marketing
- Release date: 25 August 1981
- Running time: 101 minutes
- Countries: Kenya; Nigeria; United Kingdom
- Language: English
- Budget: $26 million
- Box office: $4 million

Rise and Fall of Idi Amin, also known as Amin: The Rise and Fall, is a 1981 biographical film directed by Sharad Patel and starring Joseph Olita as Idi Amin. Olita also played Amin in the 1991 film Mississippi Masala.

== Plot ==
It details the controversial actions and atrocities of the former dictator of Uganda, Idi Amin Dada, during his violent rise to power in 1971 until his overthrow in 1979 as the result of the Uganda–Tanzania War. Rise and Fall of Idi Amin was a co-production of the United Kingdom, Kenya, and Nigeria, with most of the filming done in Kenya, less than a year after Amin's downfall.

== Historical accuracy ==
Despite being branded as an exploitation film, it is reasonably accurate with the facts and dates of the events depicted, including the Israeli raid, the war with Tanzania, and the capture, imprisonment, and sentencing of British journalist Denis Hills (who portrays himself in the film) on espionage and sedition charges following comments about Idi Amin in a book that Hills had written.

== Reaction ==
When released internationally, most of the voices were dubbed because of poor sound production.

The film won five awards, including best actor, at the Las Vegas International Film Festival.
