= Mizani (TV Series) =

2026 Kenyan television series

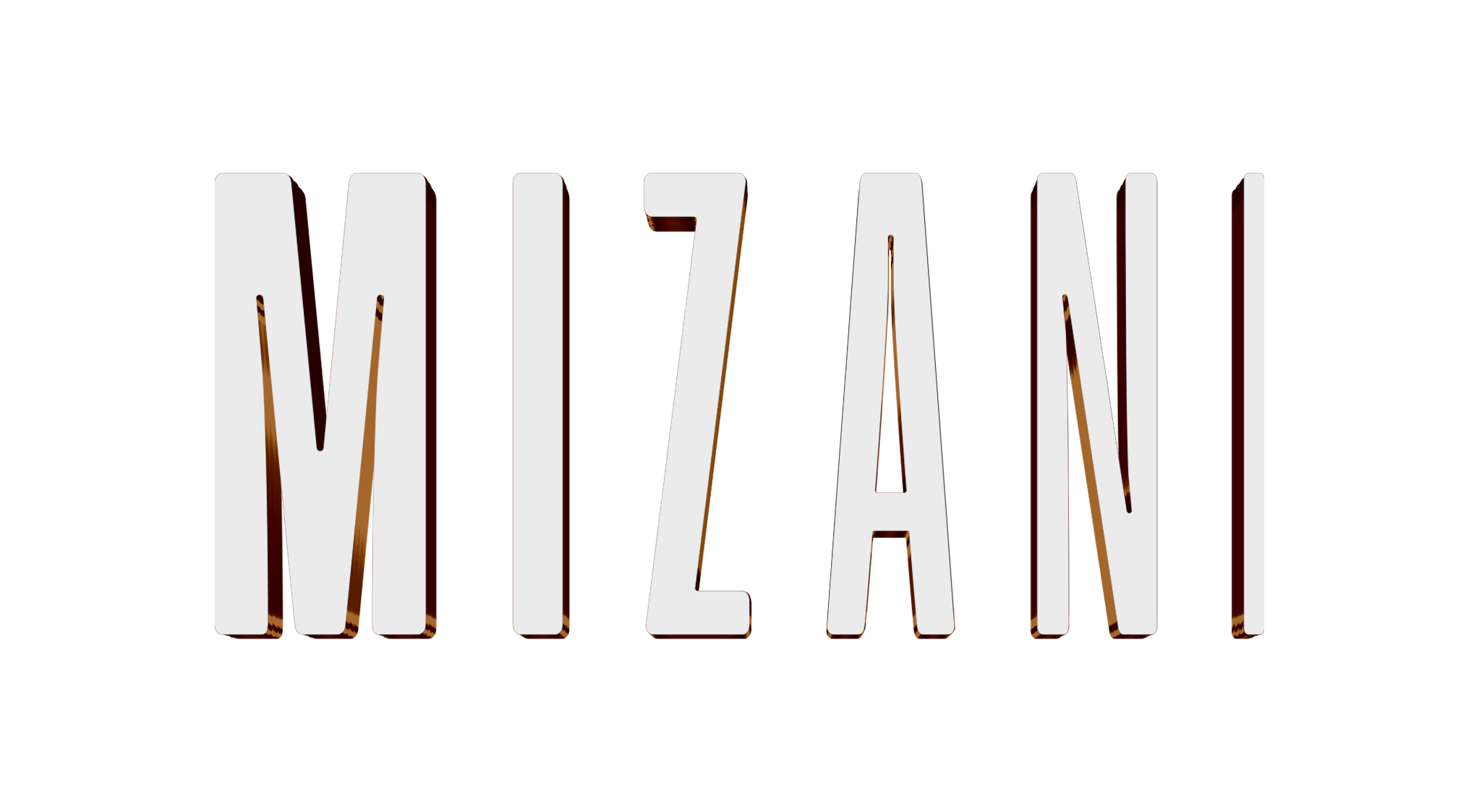
- Genre: Crime drama
- Written by: Ambat Rioba Mann; Brian Munene; Kevin Amakobe; Bill Jones Afwani
- Directed by: J.A Chumbe; Eric Mdagaya; Bill Jones Afwani; Isaya Evans
- Starring: Michael Saruni; Stephanie Maseki; Kieth Chuaga; Jack Mutinda; Denis Humphrey; Anita Wawuda; Reinhard Inzai Bonke; Bhavnesh Chudasama; Mehul Malde; Kathleen Mckenzie; Ashik Ali; Mariam Mzee; Patrick Owino; Victor Opondo; Nima Kubo
- Country of origin: Kenya
- Original languages: English; Swahili
- No. of seasons: 1
- No. of episodes: 10

Production
- Producer: Daudi Anguka
- Production company: AR Films Production

Original release
- Network: Showmax, Maisha Magic Plus
- Release: 5 February – 11 April 2026

Mizani is a Kenyan crime drama television series set and filmed in Mombasa, Kenya. Created and produced by award-winning filmmaker Daudi Anguka, the series is scheduled to premiere on Showmax on 5 February 2026 and on Maisha Magic Plus on 7 February 2026.

The show explores themes of organ trafficking, corruption, power, and family loyalty within the criminal underbelly of Kenya's coastal city.

The series marks Anguka's debut on Showmax and expands on thematic elements first introduced in his earlier film Mvera, Kenya's official submission for the 96th Academy Awards.

== Plot ==
Mizani follows Suleiman, a struggling journalist whose life is turned upside down when his young daughter is kidnapped by an organ trafficking syndicate operating in Mombasa. As he races against time to save her, Suleiman finds himself forced to confront a powerful, politically connected criminal network.

His investigation draws him deeper into a dangerous world of corruption, influence, and hidden alliances, revealing shocking family secrets and moral dilemmas where every decision carries devastating consequences. The series examines the “scales of life,” where choices can either save or destroy.

== Cast ==
- Michael Saruni as Suleiman, a driven but emotionally distant digital journalist and single father whose life is consumed by his work. When his daughter, Amira, is kidnapped by an organ trafficking ring, his mission to expose the syndicate becomes personal, forcing him to face his emotional trauma, guilt, and the consequences of his neglect.
- Stephanie Maseki as Kate Mumba, a charming yet ruthless woman living a double life. Publicly, she's a co-owner of a successful fishing empire and known for her philanthropy, but secretly, she is the leader of a deadly organ trafficking syndicate.
- Keith Chuaga as Phillip Mumba, the Governor of Mombasa County and the majority shareholder in the Mumba Fishing Company. He's a charismatic, principled, and prayerful leader who rose from being a passionate student activist to a respected public servant.
- Jack Mutinda as Solo. He is a former Special Forces officer who currently serves as Kate Mumba's personal bodyguard and enforcer.
- Denis Humphrey as Jamal, a street-smart hustler who poses as a Forex trader but is actually a low-level drug peddler in Mombasa's underground world. He is the younger brother of Suleiman's late wife and Amara's maternal uncle.
- Mehul Malde as Dr. Patel. He is the founder and CEO of Spring Hospital. Torn between ambition and ethics, Dr. Patel strives to protect his daughter Pryanka from the dark side of his operations while grooming her to eventually inherit the hospital.
- Anita Wawuda as Nimo, a disciplined DCI operative leading a specialized task force in Mombasa targeting drugs, corruption, and black-market organ trafficking.
- Kathleen Mckenzie as Dr. Priyanka Patel, daughter to Dr Patel. She is a compassionate and talented pediatrician at Spring Hospital, raised in a prestigious Indian medical family.
- Reinhard Inzai Bonke as DCI Hassan
- Patrick Owino as SG Mwinga
- Bhavnesh Chudasama as Sharrif Fazul's son.
- Ashik Ali as Sharrif Fazul. He was a once-powerful billionaire tycoon now imprisoned, but still determined to control his criminal empire from behind bars. Known for his sharp mind, ruthless business tactics, and ability to manipulate people, he built a vast network across industries like construction and nightlife.
- Mariam Mzee as Bibi Khadija. She is a hardworking fishmonger and part-time babysitter to her granddaughter Amira.
- Victor Opondo as Sanga
- Lyndsey Wanjiku as Amira Maole. She is the daughter to Suleiman.
- Ethan Mdeinzi as Levi, son to Phillip and Kate.

== Episode ==
Season	Episodes	Originally released	
Season	Episodes	First released	Last released
1	10	February 5, 2026	11 April 2026

=== Season 1 (2026) ===
No.	Title	Directed by	Written by	Original release date
1	"Episode 1"	Various	Various	5 February 2026
Amira Maole is kidnapped from school as her father struggles to progress in his journalism career. Meanwhile, Governor Philip Mumba and his wife rush their sick son to the hospital.
2	"Episode 2"	Various	Various	12 February 2026
Suleiman and his distraught mother urge the police to intensify the search for his daughter. Meanwhile, Kate Mumba effectively manages the Mumba Fisheries business while concealing her true nature.
3	"Episode 3"	Various	Various	19 February 2026
The leader of the organ trafficking ring has been revealed. Meanwhile, Suleiman searches for Amira, who is recaptured while attempting to escape.
4	"Episode 4"	Various	Various	26 February 2026
Kate Mumba finds a mysterious donor for Levy's kidney transplant as she fights back against Sharriff. Suleiman follows the breadcrumbs to track Amira's kidnappers.
5	"Episode 5"	Various	Various	5 March 2026
Governor Philip feels betrayed by his party and is frustrated when he can't find Kate and Levy before the kidney transplant surgery. Suleiman arrives on Amagunya Island, determined to rescue Amira.
6	"Episode 6"	Various	Various	12 March 2026
Suleiman gets a confession from Dr Patel as he calls in the police and races against the clock to save Amira before Levy's kidney transplant. Governor Philip makes a surprising political stand.
7	"Episode 7"	Various	Various	19 March 2026
Kate stays one step ahead of Philip, but he discovers Amira and demands to know what is happening. Suleiman narrowly escapes from Amagunya Island after a shocking revelation.
8	"Episode 8"	Various	Various	26 March 2026
Kate's complicated history with Sharriff is revealed as he returns to take over the organ trafficking syndicate. Suleiman is now a wanted man on the run from the law.
9	"Episode 9"	Various	Various	4 April 2026
Suleiman and Philip decide to work together, hoping to save both their children. Kate finds herself besieged from all sides. Was the pricing of saving Levy to high?
10	"Episode 10"	Various	Various	11 April 2026
The show concludes as Suleiman is forced to navigate a world of political intrigue, personal vendettas, and family loyalty.

== Production ==
=== Development ===
Mizani is produced by AR Film Productions, led by Daudi Anguka, one of the most prominent filmmakers from Kenya's coastal region. Anguka is known for Swahili-language productions including Pete, Sanura, Mkasi, and Mvera.

The series was filmed on location in Mombasa, using the coastal city’s urban and maritime landscapes to ground the narrative in realism. The show expands the organ trafficking storyline introduced in Mvera, presenting a darker and more urgent exploration of the subject within a long-form television format.

Filming

The series was filmed entirely on location in Mombasa, marking the first Showmax-commissioned production shot in the city. Production emphasized authenticity through local casting, real urban settings, and narratives drawn from coastal social dynamics.

Themes and Analysis

Central to Mizani is the exploration of organ trafficking in East Africa, examined through socioeconomic, political, and ethical lenses. The title Mizani (Swahili for “scales”) symbolises the balance between destructive and redemptive choices, representing the ethical crossroads faced by the characters.

Release

Mizani premiered on Showmax on 5 February 2026, with new episodes released weekly on Thursdays. The series made its linear television debut on Maisha Magic Plus on 0 February 2026, also airing every Saturday. Producer Anguka hosted a premier event in Mombasa which was attended by Youth Affairs Principal Secretary Fikirini Jacobs and the lead cast.

== Awards and nominations ==
Year	Award	Category	Recipients	Result	Ref
2026	Kalasha International Film and TV Awards	Best Supporting Actor - TV Drama	Jack Mutinda	Nominated	
2026	Zanzibar International Film Festival	Best TV Drama Series (East Africa)	Daudi Anguka	Nominated	
2026	Zanzibar International Film Festival	Best Actor in a TV Drama (East Africa)	Michael Saruni	Won	
2026	Zanzibar International Film Festival	Best Actress in a TV Drama (East Africa)	Stephanie Maseki	Nominated	
