= Charles Bukeko =

Kenyan actor and comedian (1962–2020)

- Born: 10 July 1962; Busia, Kenya
- Died: 18 July 2020 (aged 58); Nairobi, Kenya
- Resting place: Funyula Constituency, Busia
- Other name: Papa
- Education: University of Nairobi
- Occupations: Actor; Comedian
- Known for: Papa Shirandula
- Spouse: Beatrice Ebbie Andega
- Children: 3

Charles Bukeko (10 July 1962 – 18 July 2020) was a Kenyan actor and comedian. He was known for portraying the titular character in the Citizen TV comedy series Papa Shirandula, which he also created. He won the 2010 Kalasha Award for Best Actor in a TV Series for the role. Bukeko also appeared in the 2012 film The Captain of Nakara. He died on 18 July 2020, from what seemed like COVID-19 symptoms. All of his comedy programmes were dominantly aired by the Kenyan Citizen Television, and none of his fans, both children and adults rarely missed an episode.

== Early life and education ==
Bukeko was the firstborn of four children to parents Valeria Makokha and Cosmas Wafula. He was born in Busia, Kenya. He attended Jogoo Road Primary School and proceeded to Upper Hill Secondary in Nairobi, where he earned his Kenya Certificate of Secondary Education (KCSE).

== Career ==
Charles Bukeko played Otieno in the 2005 film, Project Daddy and working as a production runner on The Constant Gardener ithe same year. Back in Kenya he portrayed Matata in the TV drama Makutano Junction from 2006 to 2008. While still featuring in Makutano Junction he took a lead role as Papa in the hit comedy series, Papa Shirandula which aired on Citizen TV that ran from 2006 until 2020. In 2007, he played Wanyonyi in a film feature, Malooned. The Captain of Nakara where he played General Lumumba was his last appearance on a feature film in 2012.

He has also appeared in TV commercials. In 2001 He did an international commercial for Coca-Cola in Indonesia. For Vodacom in South Africa, he did his first concept in 2008 and the second one on 15 September 2010. He has a commercial deal with Multichoice for GoTv adverts.

== Personal life ==
Bukeko was married to Beatrice Ebbie Andega and they had three children: Tony, Charlie and Wendy. Bukeko had diabetes. He died at the Karen Hospital in Nairobi, Kenya, on 18 July 2020, after contracting COVID-19 during the pandemic. He was 58.

== Filmography ==
Year	Title	Role	Notes
2004	Project Daddy	Otieno	Cast
2005	The Constant Gardener		Production runner
2006	Makutano Junction		Cast
2007–2020	Papa Shirandula	Papa	Cast
2007	Malooned	Wanyonyi	Cast
2012	The Captain of Nakara	General Lumumba	Cast
