= Something Necessary =

2013 film

- Film poster
- Directed by: Judy Kibinge
- Written by: Mungai Kiroga; J. C. Niala
- Produced by: Sarika Hemi Lakhani; Tom Tykwer; Ginger Wilson; Roshanak Khodabakhsh
- Starring: Susan Wanjiru; Q’damah Kipchumba; Anne Kimani; David Kiprotich Mutai
- Cinematography: Yinka Edward
- Edited by: Justin Wachira; Christian Krämer
- Music by: Matthias Petsche
- Production companies: Ginger Ink Films; One Fine Day Films
- Distributed by: Rushlake Media GmbH
- Release date: 28 January 2013 (IFF Rotterdam)
- Running time: 85 minutes
- Country: Kenya
- Language: Swahili

Something Necessary is a 2013 Kenyan drama film directed by Judy Kibinge. It was screened in the Contemporary World Cinema section at the 2013 Toronto International Film Festival.

== Plot ==
Kenya 2007: Following the results of the disputed presidential elections, widespread violence erupts. Gangs of unemployed youth incited by politicians take to the streets all over the country.

Anne wakes up in a hospital from a coma to find that the life she had before the violence no longer exists. Her husband is dead and has been buried before she had a chance to mourn him. Her son Kitur is in a coma and The Haven, her farm and home, has been vandalized and ransacked. She has gone from being a nurse, wife and mother to an unemployed widow with a hospitalized son struggling to rebuild her farm.

What’s more, she is a Kikuyu woman living in Kalenjin land, whose sister believes she does not belong there and should return home to be amongst her people instead. But as far as Anne is concerned, she is at home and will not allow anyone to frighten her away.

In a village not far from The Haven, Joseph, a young man, is also coming to grips with the post-election violence. Heavily weighed down by the guilt brought about by his participation in the post-election violence, he desperately seeks to move forward, but his gang won’t let him. Forced to quit school because his mother cannot afford the fees, he unsuccessfully seeks various forms of menial employment. He draws strength from a budding romance with Chebet and the dream of a new start with her.

Once recovered, Anne tackles the arduous task of rebuilding her life. The Haven comes to symbolize everything she lost and her quest to rebuild it becomes something increasingly necessary. Attempts to borrow money from her wealthy brother-in-law and then from her former workplace, the local hospital, both fail. Finally, she sells her husband's car and reconstruction takes off to a promising start.

Though she is on the government Commission of Enquiry into the violence and is travelling through the country collecting witness accounts of the violence, Anne does not consider testifying. Joseph too hears of the commission but believes there is no point in testifying against his tormentors, telling Chebet, “Whatever they did, I did too.” He loses his job at a maize storage factory when the gang attacks him, leaving him bedridden, but soon finds part-time work as a pickup loader. This job takes him to Anne’s farm, where he recognizes her and anonymously commits an act of kindness to help her prepare for her son's return from the hospital.

Kitur's awakening from the coma fills Anne with hope that everything will now be alright. It isn’t long, however, before she begins to encounter new obstacles. As her relentless optimism slowly gives way to depression, bills mount and her young son transforms into a sullen and resentful pre-teen. When he is taken away from he,r this is the final straw: Anne needs a miracle.

As the film draws to a close, Joseph observes his mother working and wonders what the point of it all is. He decides to shed his violent past and leave the village to start a new life in Nairobi with the girl of his dreams. As this is happening, Anne finds her faith unexpectedly restored through an anonymous gift which gives her the courage and the strength she so badly needs to stand up, face her past and move on.

== Cast ==
- Susan Wanjiru as Anne
- Kipng'eno Kirui Duncan as Chepsoi
- Hilda Jepkoech as Chebet
- Carolyne Chebiwott Kibet as Jerono
- Anne Kimani as Gathoni
- Walter Lagat as Joseph
- David Kiprotich Mutai as Lesit
- Chomba Njeru as Karogo
- Benjamin Nyagaka as Kitur
- Anne Kimani as gathoni
- Chelimo Waiyaki as Mrs. Sirma
- Sarah Chemutai as Mrs.Kibet
- Njambui Kamau as Mercy
- Martin Njoroge as Steve
- Eddy Kimani as Commission Chairman / Radio Announcer
- Philip Chege as Commission Clerk
- Nini Wacera as Grace
- Margaret Githongo as Hotel Receptionist
- Henry Ntutu as Hardware Customer
- Shem Imbaya as Phone Shopkeeper
- Henry Gitau as Pick-up Owner #1
- Anthony Rutabingwa as Pick-up Owner
- John Rimel as Pick-up Owner #
- Maina Gichohi as Maize Silo Manager
- Edwin Bosco as Maize Silo Worker #1
- Martin Kimamo Mwangi as Maize Silo Worker #2
- Stanley Sankau as Quarry Manager
- Lenna Muthoki Nzomo as Nurse
- Mary Wanjiru Wanjiku as Salon Hairdresser #1
- Juliet Njoki Kigima as Salon Hairdresser #2
- Mercy Wanjiruu as Commission Witness #1
- Beatrice Wangeci as Commission Witness #2
- Sharleen Njeri as Commission Witness #3
- Isaiah Otieno as Speaker at Tribunal
- Sauda Mohamed Haji as Speaker at Tribunal #2
- James Mburu as Speaker at Tribunal #3
- Elisha Bett Kiprotich as Gang Member #1
- Justus Kiprono Ngeno as Gang Member #2
- Emmanuel Kiberton as Gang Member #3
- Shadrack Kipng'eno Korir as Gang Member #4
- Mathias Nyamai as Gang Member #5
- Alfred Cheruitot Rono as Gang Member #6
- Felix Kipkemboi as Gang Member #7
- Kennedy Kipchirchir Kwambai as Gang Member #8

== Reception ==
KenyaBuzz praised the film for elevating the standards of Kenyan filmmaking, saying "In terms of quality, I believe it is safe to say that Kenyan filmmaking is never going back""The review also reckoned that audiences may find parts of the story overwhelming: "There are several moments in which emotion cannot be contained, ncluding a very cringe-worthy abortion scene ,which is guaranteed to haunt audiences for days."
