= John Anthony Kaiser =

20th-century American Catholic priest and missionary

Reverend John Anthony Kaiser, M.H.M.
- Church: Catholic Church

Orders
- Ordination: 1964

Personal details
- Born: November 29, 1932 Perham, Minnesota, USA
- Died: August 23, 2000 (aged 67) Morendat, Kenya

John Anthony Kaiser (November 29, 1932 – August 23, 2000) was a Roman Catholic priest and Mill Hill father from Perham, Minnesota, US, who was assassinated near his mission at Morendat, near Naivasha, Rift Valley Province, Kenya.

== Early life ==
John Anthony Kaiser was born in Perham, Minnesota, USA. John attended Saint John's Preparatory School and St. John's University in Collegeville, Minnesota, for two years before he joined the army in 1954. He was a paratrooper and advanced to the rank of Sergeant. He graduated from Saint Louis University in 1960 with a BA in English Literature. While in St. Louis, he joined the Knights of Columbus. From here, he went to St. Joseph Seminary in Mill Hill, England, where he studied from 1960 to 1964. Kaiser was ordained in St. Louis for the Mill Hill Fathers in 1964 and was sent to their missions in Kenya.

== Maela refugee camp ==
Kaiser spent 20 years in the missions in the Kisii Diocese. Over that time the Catholic population had doubled so that 48 priests were ministering to more than half a million Catholics in the diocese, many living in grinding poverty. In 1993, he was reassigned to the Maela refugee camp in the Ngong Diocese. Refugees fled to the camp as a result of tribal violence, armed gangs driving them from their homes and then torching the buildings. Kaiser and others thought the government was fomenting the violence as part of a land grab. Amid international attention, on Christmas Eve, 1994 the camp was closed and the refugees were forcibly resettled. Kaiser protested the closing, but he was arrested, beaten, and released into the bush. Following these events, Kaiser was reassigned to preach to the more distant Maasai at Lolgorian Parish.

In 1998, at great personal risk, Kaiser testified before the Akiwumi Commission, investigating the causes of the violence and the closing of the camp. In public, sworn testimony, Kaiser fingered prominent cabinet ministers in the incumbent government, as well as the then-President, Daniel arap Moi. His testimony was quashed. The report of the commission was released on October 18, 2002. It confirmed the charges made by Kaiser, "indicted ... senior officials", and "accused senior officials of giving inflammatory speeches and in some cases financing persons responsible for the violence."

Kaiser had also helped two schoolgirls in summer 1999. The girls claimed they had been raped by Julius Sunkuli, a cabinet minister in the Moi government. Sunkuli is alleged to have offered money for an abortion, but the girl, a fourteen-year-old named Florence, decided to keep her baby. Kaiser put the girls in touch with the Kenyan Federation of Women Lawyers, FIDA-Kenya. The attorneys submitted the evidence to the government, but Sunkuli was never charged. Instead, police stormed the building where the girls were hiding.

== Troubles with the Kenyan government ==
In November, 1999, the Kenyan government tried to deport Kaiser, claiming that his work permit had expired. Kaiser briefly went into hiding in Kisii before he was granted a new work permit, but only after intervention by the US Ambassador Johnnie Carson and Bishop Colin Davis of Ngong.

In March, 2000, the independent Law Society of Kenya presented Kaiser with its annual Human Rights Award, for his public testimony before the Akiwumi Commission and his support of the two girls. They called him "a study in courage, determination and sacrifice on behalf of the weak, oppressed and downtrodden."

Kaiser knew of the dangers of speaking out in Kenya, and of a fate which had befallen many others. In a book about his experiences at the Maela camp, he wrote a warning.

I want all to know that if I disappear from the scene, because the bush is vast and hyenas many, that I am not planning any accident, nor, God forbid, any self destruction. Instead, I trust in a good guardian angel and in the action of grace.

— "If I Die," John Kaiser,

== Death and aftermath ==
On August 23, 2000, Kaiser was shot in the back of the head at close range with a shotgun. His body was found at 6 am the next day beneath two acacia trees by a butcher named George, at Morendat junction on the Nakuru-Naivasha road in Nakuru county, Kenya. He was carrying documents he intended to present to the Akiwumi Commission. He was also to testify against the Moi government before the International Criminal Court in the Hague in three weeks. The first police officers on the scene thought he had been murdered.

Less than a week after Kaiser's death, Florence Mpayei dropped her rape case against Julius Sunkuli.

Kenya's chief government pathologist and a pathologist from an independent human rights organization present at the autopsy thought Kaiser was killed from a muzzle distance of about 3 feet (0.91 m), from which suicide would be impossible. An FBI expert from Texas, who did not examine Kaiser but only saw photographs, concluded that Kaiser had committed suicide. The Moi government readily agreed.

However, in August 2011, the Kenya Human Rights Commission declared that Dr. Frank Njenga intentionally deceived and misled the FBI by fabricating a false report to make them believe that Father Kaiser, a devout Catholic priest, was suffering from mental illness and had committed suicide. Furthermore, the commission ordered Dr. Frank Njenga to apologize to Father Kaiser’s family and the Mill Hill Missionaries for besmirching the good name of Father Kaiser. Finally, in August 2013, a report published by The Truth, Justice and Reconciliation Commission of Kenya officially confirmed that Father John Anthony Kaiser's death was a political assassination.

After Father Kaiser's death, both houses of the United States Congress passed a joint resolution calling Kaiser's death "an assassination" and calling for the US State Department to investigate.

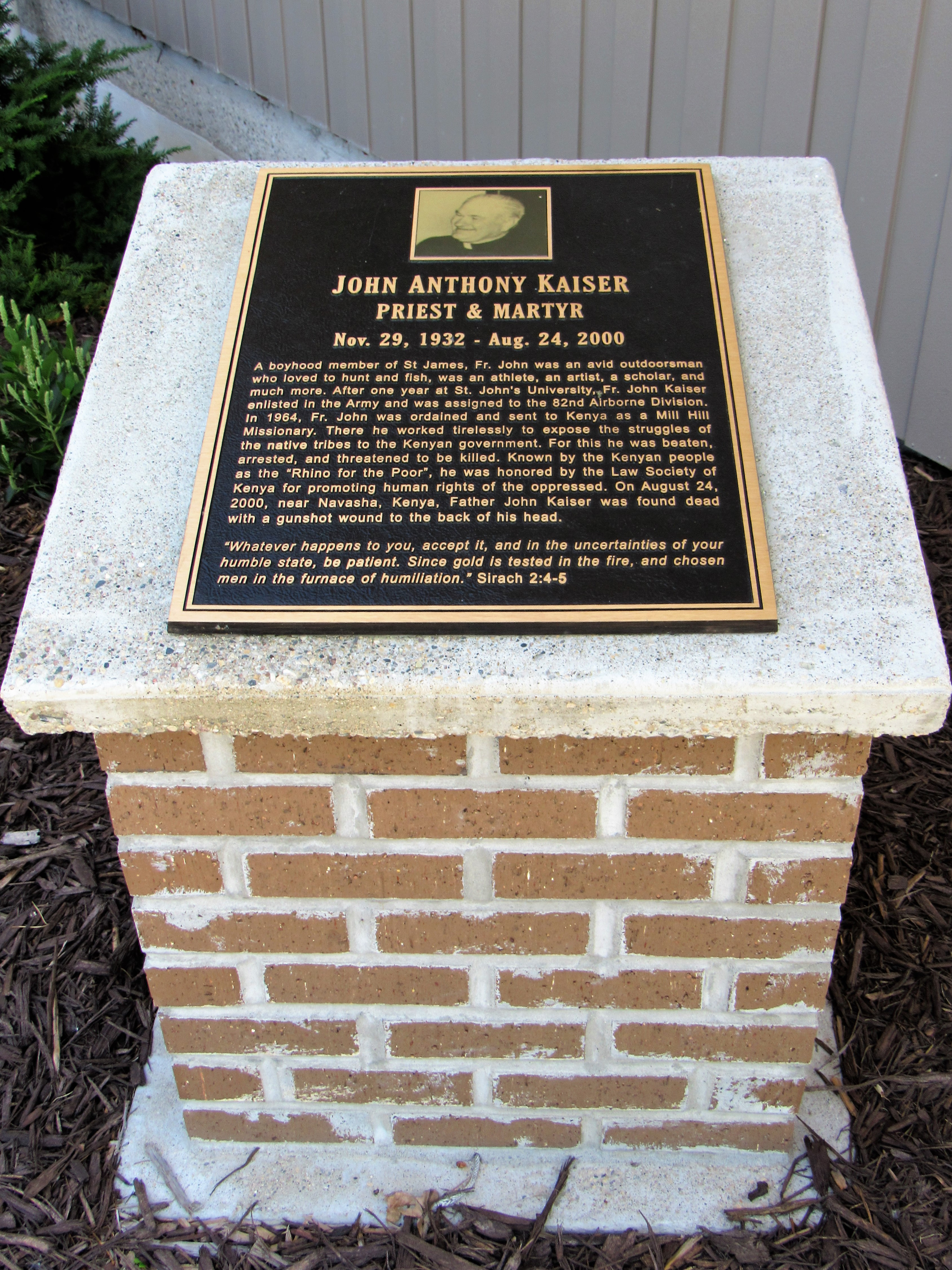
Memorial at his home parish, St. James in Maine Township, Otter Tail County, Minnesota

The papal nuncio, Giovanni Tonucci, said at Kaiser's funeral in the Nairobi basilica, "The church, through pitiless violence, has once more been deprived of one of her ministers. Let no one have any doubts about it: we are celebrating a religious occasion; we are reflecting on a religious assassination, not a political one. Fr. Kaiser has been murdered because he was, and in the eternity of God still is, a Catholic priest who preached the Gospel. Those who killed him, those who planned his killing, wanted to silence the voice of the Gospel."..."Only two days before his death, I met Fr. Kaiser for a long conversation. At the end, he asked my blessing, which I reluctantly gave him. At that moment, I thought it would have been better if he, an old and worthy missionary, had blessed me. How much more I am convinced of that now that we look at him as a martyr of the faith?" Also present at the altar was Maurice Cardinal Otunga, Archbishop Emeritus of Nairobi.

The Law Society of Kenya renamed its annual award the Fr. Kaiser Human Rights Award. A new Kenyan government was elected in 2002. Since then, the Kenyan National Human Rights Commission posthumously honored Kaiser with its 2006 Milele (Lifetime) Achievement Award. Kaiser also posthumously received the Twin Cities International Citizen Award from the cities of Minneapolis and St. Paul in 2000, and the Lumen Gentium Award from St. John's Preparatory School in 2004.

Correspondent Carol Marin and producer Peter W. Klein of the American news program 60 Minutes conducted an investigation into the death of Kaiser, which put pressure on the international community to solve the mystery of how he died. The Kenyan government reopened the inquest into Kaiser's death at the request of the Kenyan Episcopal Conference. The inquest ended on June 12, 2007, after hearing from 111 witnesses. The presiding magistrate, Maureen Odero, said on August 1, 2007, that Kaiser was murdered, ruled that the "Suicide Theory" was based on a preconceived notion, but stated that "she could not – on the basis of evidence tabled before her in the inquest – point out with certainty who the priest's killers were".

== The Rugged Priest ==
The Rugged Priest is a 2011 film which won the 2011 Golden Dhow award at the 14th Zanzibar International Film Festival and the Verona Jury award for the Best African Feature Film.

== You Will See Fire ==
In 2011, W. W. Norton & Company published the book You Will See Fire: A Search for Justice in Kenya, an account of Father Kaiser's life and death by investigative journalist Christopher Goffard.
