= The Rugged Priest =

- Film poster
- Directed by: Bob Nyanja
- Written by: Mark Mutahi; Bob Nyanja
- Produced by: Isabel Njoroge
- Starring: Jason Corder; Oliver Litondo; Serah Ndanu
- Cinematography: Martin N. Munyua
- Edited by: Joy Lusige
- Music by: Geo Höhn
- Production company: Cinematic Solutions Ltd.
- Release date: 3 March 2011
- Country: Kenya
- Language: English

The Rugged Priest is a 2011 Kenyan biographical film directed by Bob Nyanja. It is based on the life and death of John Anthony Kaiser.

== Cast ==
- Jason Corder as American Ambassador
- Lwanda Jawar as Father Ian
- Oliver Litondo as Catholic Bishop
- Serah Ndanu as Alice
- Ainea Ojiambo as Ole Shompole
- Colin Simpson as Father John Kalser

== Accolade ==
The film won the Golden Dhow Award at the Zanzibar International Film Festival. On the 3rd Kalasha International Film & TV Awards, the film won a Kalasha Award for Best Feature Film.
