= Malooned! =

- Malooned!
- Directed by: Bob Nyanja
- Written by: Mark Mutahi
- Starring: Godfrey Odhiambo; Gabriella Mutia; Charles Bukeko
- Edited by: Joy Lusige
- Music by: Bruce Odhiambo
- Release date: 2007
- Running time: 100 minutes
- Country: Kenya

Malooned! is a 2007 film directed by Bob Nyanja, set in Kenya in English language.

It was shown at Balafon Film Festival in Bari and at the 28º Festival di Cinema Africano di Verona, where it won several awards, assigned by the official jury composed of Annamaria Gallone, Farah Polato, Esoh Elamé, Martin Mhando, Emmanuel Mbaide. The film won the Silver Dhow at Zanzibar International Film Festival 2007 and the Jury Prize at Kenya Film Festival.

The film exposes some of the prejudices and stereotypes among ethnic groups in Kenya.
