= Patrick Oketch =

Kenyan actor (born 1981)

- Born: 1981 (age 44–45)
- Citizenship: Kenyan
- Education: Kenyatta University
- Occupation: Actor
- Known for: playing Charlie in the Citizen TV drama series Mother-in-Law
- Notable work: Intellectual Scum

Patrick Oketch is a Kenyan actor known for playing Charlie in the Citizen TV drama series Mother-in-Law. He also portrayed Field Ruwe in the 2015 short film Intellectual Scum. Born in 1981 in the Mathare Slums, Patrick is a trained teacher currently pursuing a degree in Theatre Studies and Film Technology at Kenyatta University. He is also a prolific scriptwriter and the script editor for the star-studded show MaEmpress on Maisha Magic.

== Selected filmography ==
- The Captain of Nakara (2012) as Captain
- Sticking Ribbons (2013) as Violent Man
- Intellectual Scum (2015) as Field Ruwe
- Kaze ni Tatsu Lion (2015) as Afundi
- Get Some Money (2017) as Kato Yohanna
- Click Click Bang (2022) as Coaches
- Nawi (2024) as Emanikor
