= Wuz Dat? =

2018 single by Boity

Single by Boity and Nasty C

from the EP 4436
- Released: 27 August 2018
- Recorded: August 2018
- Genre: Hip hop
- Length: 3:38
- Label: Universal Music South Africa
- Songwriter(s): Boitumelo Thulo; David Junior Ngcobo
- Producer(s): Nasty C

Boity Thulo singles chronology
| "Wuz Dat?" (2018) | "Original Recipe" (2019) |

Nasty C singles chronology
| "Legendary" (2018) | "Wuz Dat?" (2018) | "Don't BAB" (2018) |

Music video
- "Wuz Dat? (Official music video)"

Official audio
- "Wuz Dat?"

"Wuz Dat?" is a lead single by South African TV personality and rapper Boity and rapper Nasty C from her debut extended play (EP) 4436 (2020) released on 27 August 2018 through Universal Music South Africa, it was certified Platinum in South Africa which became the first single by a female rapper in South Africa to be certified Platinum.

== Certifications ==
| Region | Certification | Certified units/sales |
|---|---|---|
| South Africa (RISA) | Platinum | 20,000 |
