= 4436 =

EP by Boity
- Released: 4 December 2020
- Genre: Hip hop
- Length: 30:22
- Language: English; Sesotho; Setswana; Sepedi; Zulu language
- Label: Universal Music South Africa (a division of Universal Music Group)
- Producer: Reason (also exec.); Bash Vision (also exec.); Nasty C; Crumz; Ganja Beatz; The Gobbla; pH

Singles from 4436
- 1. "Wuz Dat? (with Nasty C)" Released: 27 August 2018; 2. "Bakae" Released: 8 February 2019

4436 is the debut extended play (EP) by South African rapper and TV personality Boity Thulo (mononymously known as Boity). It was released on 4 December 2020 by Universal Music South Africa. The title signifies the street number of where she grew up in Potchefstroom.

== Awards and nominations ==
Year	Award ceremony	Category	Results	Ref.
2021	27th South African Music Awards	Best Hip Hop Album	Nominated	
2021	2021 South African Hip Hop Awards	Mixtape Of The Year	Nominated	
