= The Lion Standing in the Wind =

2015 Japanese drama film

- Kanji: 風に立つライオン
- Revised Hepburn: Kaze ni Tatsu Raion
- Directed by: Takashi Miike
- Screenplay by: Hiroshi Saitō
- Based on: Kaze ni Tatsu Lion by Masashi Sada
- Produced by: Naoto Fujimura; Sako Sakami; Shigeji Maeda
- Starring: Takao Osawa; Satomi Ishihara; Yōko Maki; Masato Hagiwara
- Cinematography: Nobuyasu Kita
- Edited by: Kenji Yamashita
- Music by: Kōji Endō
- Production companies: AX-ON; OLM; Rakueisha
- Distributed by: Toho
- Release date: March 14, 2015
- Running time: 139 minutes
- Country: Japan
- Languages: Japanese; English
- Box office: ¥132.7 million (Japan)

The Lion Standing in the Wind (風に立つライオン, Kaze ni Tatsu Raion) is a 2015 Japanese drama film directed by Takashi Miike. It was released on March 14, 2015. It is based on the true story of a Japanese doctor working in Africa using information from letters sent home to the girl he left behind in Japan. The letters originally formed the basis for the popular 1987 Japanese song "Kaze ni Tatsu Lion" by Masashi Sada, who was encouraged by actor Takao Osawa to adapt the song into a novel. The novel was released in 2013 and was later adapted into the 2015 film directed by Takashi Miike.

== Plot ==
The young volunteer surgeons Katsuhiko Aoki and Kōichirō Shimada travel to Kenya to assist Dr. Murakami in his studies at the Institute of Tropical Medicine as well as in his treatment of locals. They are then sent for a month to Lokichogio to perform surgery on child soldiers and Kōichirō is so moved by his experience that he later asks to return to Lokichogio, where he is joined by Wakako Kusano.

Kōichirō had previously had a relationship with Takako Akishima in Nagasaki and had invited her to come with him to Africa but she chose to remain with her family to eventually take over her father's medical practice. Prior to that, Kōichirō had stuttered in high school but was able to overcome it when he sang as a soloist in the school choir.

An injured child soldier named Ndung'u is brought to the hospital in Lokichogio and Kōichirō operates on his leg but the boy is left using crutches. Ndung'u is very distrustful of others and his only intention is to return to life as a soldier. Kōichirō leaves the city to get supplies and Ndung'u is certain that he will not return. When Kōichirō returns, Ndung'u is surprised and reconsiders his plans for the future. He begins using his artistic talents to draw portraits of the doctors. After Kōichirō dresses up as Santa Claus and hands out Christmas presents to the children, Ndung'u decides to become a doctor to atone for his past crimes.

Kōichirō decides to stay in Lokichogio instead of returning to Japan. Wakako privately sets up an orphanage. Takako takes over her father's practice. While attempting to visit an old patient, shots are fired at Kōichirō's vehicle and he is killed by a grenade.

After the 2011 Tōhoku earthquake, an old woman whose illness was treated by Kōichirō visits the orphanage and donates a small bag of corn kernels to the people suffering in Japan. Ndung'u travels to the Tōhoku with the kernels and befriends an orphaned Japanese boy.

== Cast ==
- Takao Osawa as Kōichirō Shimada
- Satomi Ishihara as Wakako Kusano
- Yōko Maki as Takako Akishima
- Masato Hagiwara as Katsuhiko Aoki
- Ryōhei Suzuki
- Ayako Fujitani as Satoko Kojima
  - Honoka Matsumoto as young Satoko
- Kumi Nakamura as Kiyomi Akijima
- Hajime Yamazaki as Seiichi Akijima
- Renji Ishibashi as Masayuki Murakami
- Nick Reding
- Patrick Oketch as Afundi
- Lydia Gitachu

== Reception ==
The film earned ¥132.691 million on its opening weekend in Japan.
