= Njue Kevin =

Kenyan film director (born 1992)

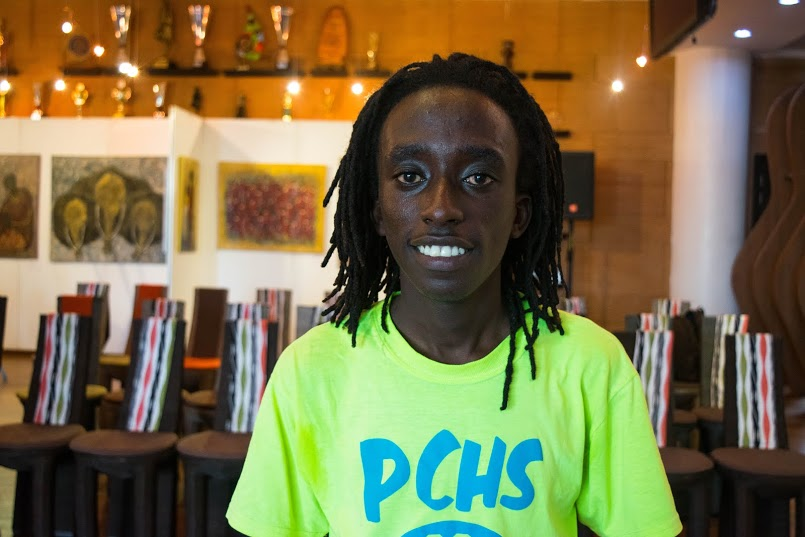
- Born: 19 February 1992 (age 34)
- Education: Kenyatta University
- Occupation: Filmmaker
- Years active: 2013—present
- Notable work: Intellectual Scum (2015); 18 Hours (2017); Safari Big Girl Small World MTV Shuga Mashariki
- Awards: 1. Forbes Africa #30Under30 list 2. Africa Movie Academy Award for Best First Feature Film by a Director
- Website: www.rocquepictures.net

Njué Kevin (born 19 February 1992) is a Kenyan film director, producer and screenwriter. He is best known for writing and directing the film 18 Hours which won the Best Overall Movie in Africa, AMVCA 2018. This category had never seen a Kenyan film be nominated, and so marked history as the first Kenyan film to be nominated and win in the history of the awards.

Njue became the first Kenyan filmmaker to be listed on the Forbes Africa under 30 list 2019 (Creatives).

Njue Kevin currently works as a senior producer for MTV Staying Alive Foundation where he recently brought back the MTV Shuga franchise back to Kenya with a new look, MTV Shuga Mashariki.

== Career ==
After joining college at Kenyatta University, Njue met childhood friend Bill Jones Afwani and the two have since then collaborated in all their projects. In his college life, Njue has directed two short films and produced two other shorts, all of which have won awards in international festivals outside Kenya.

=== 2013 ===
The first was titled Sticking Ribbons (2013), which Njue wrote from his Kenyatta University dormitory. He produced the film while his friend Bill directed it. The film starred Maureen Koech, a popular Kenyan actress known for winning the award for Best Supporting Actress in the Africa Magic Viewers Choice Awards in 2013. The film was a success, as it went on to win the SIGNIS award for best East African talent

at the 2014 Zanzibar International Film Festival. Sticking Ribbons is a story about Kimberley, a former sex addict, who addresses a group of recovering addicts as to why after being released from rehab, she enrolls right back.

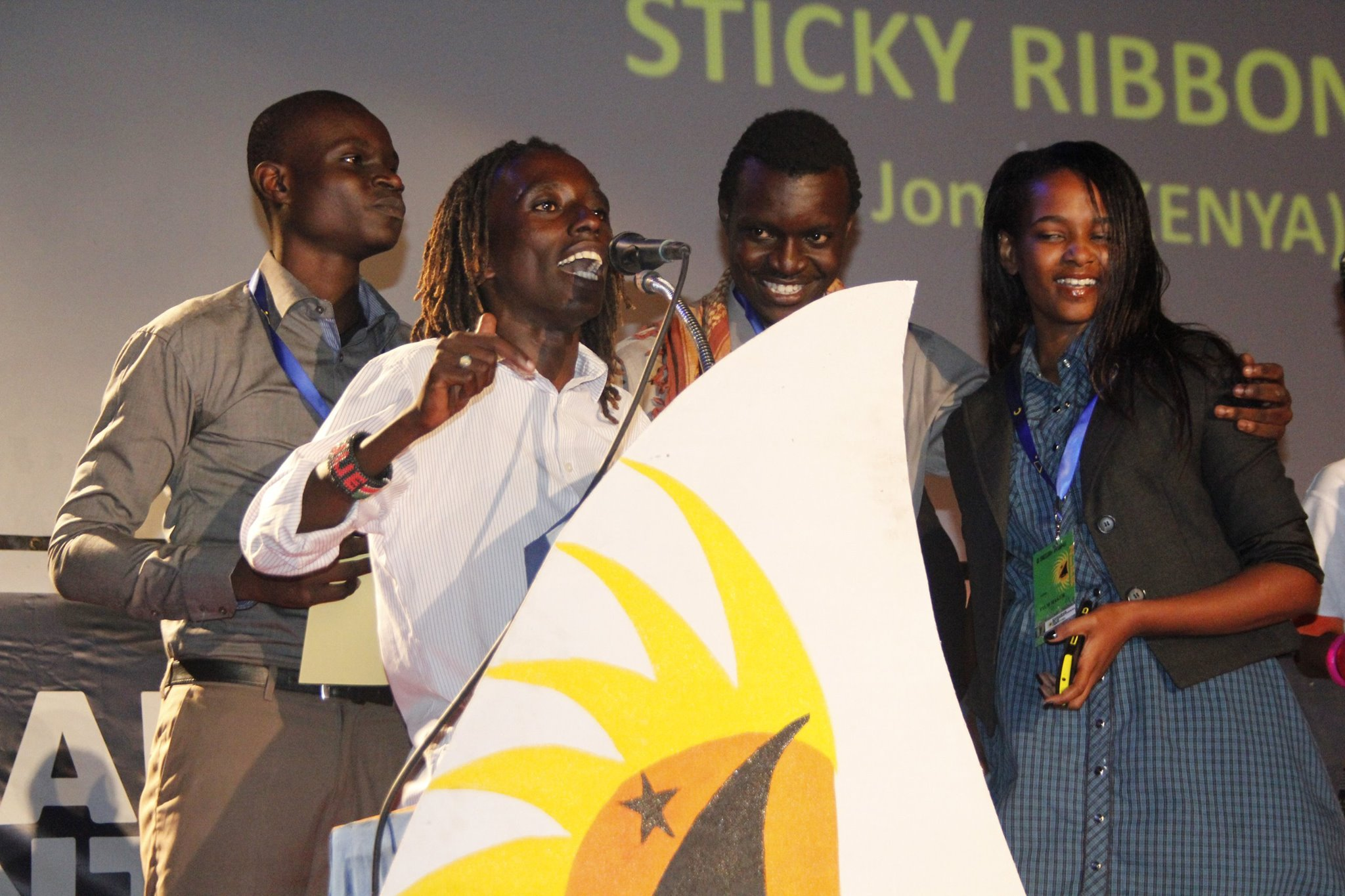
From left, Bill Afwani, Njue Kevin, Brian Achar & Maureen Koech while receiving the prize at Zanzibar International film festival.

=== 2014 ===
Impressed by the previous short, Phoebe Ruguru, a Kenyan filmmaker based in London, contacted Njue on Facebook and they teamed up to make the second short film titled Saidia/Help, which was penned by Njue.

Ruguru directed the film, which was shot entirely on an IPhone 4S and edited on the same day, as the filmmakers were in a rush to beat a festival deadline. The film was shot at Kenyatta University grounds and Njue's dormitory. It went on to win the 2014 Best Young Director award at the Unchosen modern day slavery short film festival in London.

Saidia is a story about Jurgis, an African man sold into slavery on a Lithuanian farm. He first has to learn the culture and language before he can find his way back home.

=== 2015 ===
In 2015, after acquiring the rights to the article "You Lazy Intellectual African Scum" by Field Ruwe, Njue wrote and directed the film Intellectual Scum, released the same year. This was the film that sealed Njue's place as one of the brightest young minds in Kenyan film when it went ahead to screen on three continents, Africa, Europe and North America, at 10 different international film festivals. Some of the festivals included Zanzibar International Film Festival, Africa International Film Festival, Cork African Film Festival, Silicon Valley African Film Festival and Film Africa in London.

Critics across the East African region praised Intellectual Scum as being the most successful short film in the history of Kenyan cinema. Intellectual scum is a film worth watching, as it creates a sense of belief that our solutions will come from this African continent.

=== 2017 ===
At the beginning of the year, Njue was featured among the Hubrif Watchlist Young African Talents of 2017. He went ahead to write and direct his first feature film 18 Hours which premiered to a sold-out crowd on 10 November.

=== Influences ===
Njue has cited Woody Allen, Christopher Nolan, Luc Besson, the Coen brothers, Alejandro Gonzalez Inarritu, Biyi Bandele and Abderrahmane Sissako as influences. Njue's personal favorite films include Léon: The Professional, Chinatown, The Tree of Life, Inception, Children of Men, and Fargo.

=== Views on the film industry in Kenya ===
Njue is a vocal proponent for African films. In Kenya especially, they are very few established filmmakers and Njue is always vocal about the support from both the government of Kenya and private investors. Filmmaking is a tough nut to crack, in all honesty. "Film is a business like any other. Billions are made annually in other regions. Why not Kenya?" he said at an interview with the magazine Business Daily.

== Filmography ==
| Year | Film | Role | Notes |
|---|---|---|---|
| 2013 | Sticking Ribbons | Writer and Producer | Won the best East African talent at the 2014 Zanzibar international film festival. |
| 2014 | Saidia/Help | Writer and Producer | Won best young director award at the 2014 modern day slavery short film competition in London. |
| 2015 | Intellectual Scum | Writer and Director | Official Selection at the following festivals: 1. Silicon Valley African Film Festival 2015, CA, USA.; 2. Film Africa 2015, United Kingdom.; 3. Africa international film festival, 2015. Nigeria.; 4. Africa Film Festival "Out of Europe" in Cologne/Germany.; 5. Cork Africa Film festival 2015, Ireland.; 6. Afrika Film festival 2016, Belgium.; 7. Luxor African film festival 2016, Egypt.; 8. Cameroon International Film Festival, 2016.; 9. Out of Africa Film festival 2015, Kenya.; 10. The Zanzibar International Film Festival 2015.; 11. Slum Film festival, 2015. Kenya *Winner; 12. Golden Diana awards, 2015. Austria; 13. Kalasha International, Kenya. |
| 2015 | Plastic Maasai | Writer and Director | Completed. Distributed by Showmax Kenya. |
| 2017 | 18 Hours | Writer and Director | Opened in cinemas across East Africa on 10 November 2017 and screened for 6 weeks after a sold out premiere. |
