= Sissy-Boy =

Dutch high street clothing and accessories chain

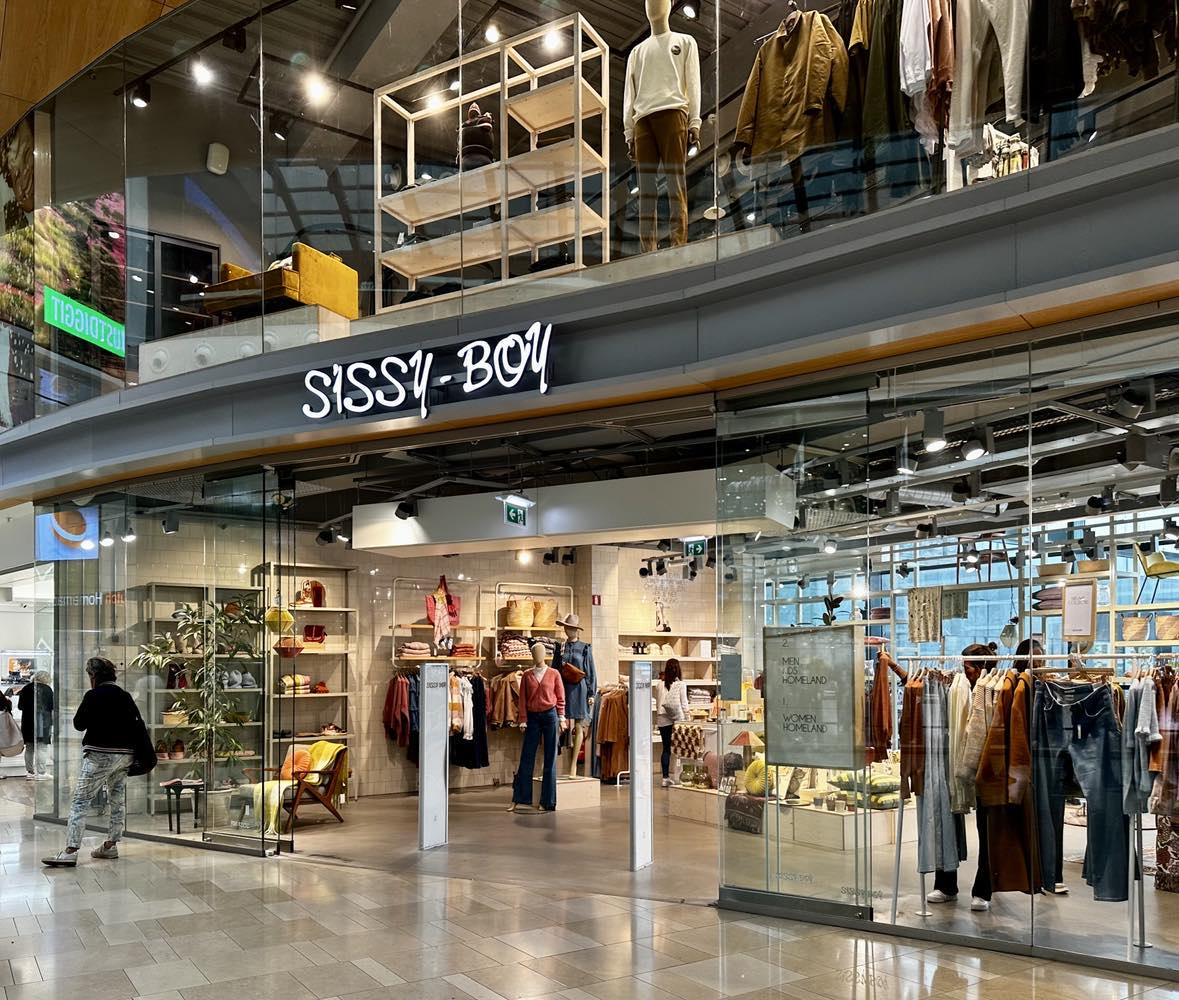
- Sissy-Boy store inside the Hoog Catharijne shopping center, Utrecht
- Trade name: Sissy-Boy
- Industry: Retail
- Founded: 1982
- Founder: Michael Smit
- Key people: Romy Schneider
- Website: sissy-boy.com

Sissy-Boy, founded in 1982, is a Dutch high street clothing and accessories chain with over 45 stores in the Netherlands, Belgium, and Luxembourg.

== Merchandise ==
Besides clothes (for what is described as an "upscale" audience), the stores sell household textiles, such as drapes and curtains. After management realized that customers were often interested in the furniture in the stores, they started selling that too. Clothes and fabrics are designed in-house.

The company designs and sells tricot dresses with flower prints, based on the 1970s era wrap dress first designed by Diane von Fürstenberg, and reintroduced in the 1990s. In addition to their own designs, Sissy-Boy also sells tricot dresses by King Louie.

== History ==
The first Sissy-Boy location was opened in Amsterdam in 1982 under the name Scoot by Michael Smit. Together with Romy Schneider, they began a clothing line, naming it "Sissy" after the nickname of Queen Elisabeth of Bavaria. The line's clothes were initially all sold as unisex, but expanded to include men's clothes. 'Boy' was then added to the name to reflect this change in focus.

As of 2008, there were over thirty Sissy-Boy stores in the Netherlands, and one was opened in Antwerp, Belgium, in the summer of 2009. The company opened a "concept store" on the KNSM Island.

The company was bought by the Brand Retail Group in 2017, which said in 2019 it had always planned to sell it on. By 2018 they intensified their search for a buyer, since sales were disappointing, but in 2019 the company was close to bankruptcy. In 2019, the company was indeed declared bankrupt at a time when a number of well-known Dutch chains of stores got in financial trouble. At the time, it had 45 stores in the Netherlands, Belgium, and Luxembourg, and 600 employees. The company was bought out by Termeer, a family company that owns a number of other clothing and shoe stores.

In 2021, an outlet store was opened in The Hague, a new store was opened in Brugge, Belgium, and Sissy-Boy started a capsule collection, their first, with Rachel van Sas.
