= Bill Jones Afwani =

Kenyan film director and producer

- Born: 1992 (age 33–34)
- Occupations: Screenwriter, Cinematographer, Film Director and Producer
- Notable work: Sticking Ribbons
- Awards: 2014 Best East African Filmmaker at the Zanzibar International Film Festival

Bill Jones Afwani (born 1992) is a Kenyan screenwriter, cinematographer film director and producer whose first short film Sticking Ribbons was selected at the 2014 Zanzibar International Film Festival and won the Signis award for "Best East African Talent". He is a co-founder of Himiza Narrative. His debut feature film came with SAFARI movie which premiered on Netflix. He has produced other feature films for M-net such as AGONDA & CHINGA, showing on Showmax. In 2026, he co-directed and co-wrote Mombasa based crime drama, Mizani, for Maisha Magic Plus.

== Filmography ==
Year	Title	Role	Category
2013	Sticking Ribbons	Director	Short film
2014	Saidia	Cinematographer	Short film
2015	Intellectual Scum	Producer	Short film
2016	Plastic Maassai	Producer	Short film
2017	18 Hours	Producer	Drama Thriller
2022	Safari	Director	Adventure
2022	Chinga	Director Writer	Drama
2023	Agonda	Director	Mystery Writer
2024	Ndoto	Writer	Short film

== Awards and nominations ==
- Won the 2014 Best East African Filmmaker at the Zanzibar International Film Festival
