= Judy Kibinge =

Kenyan film director

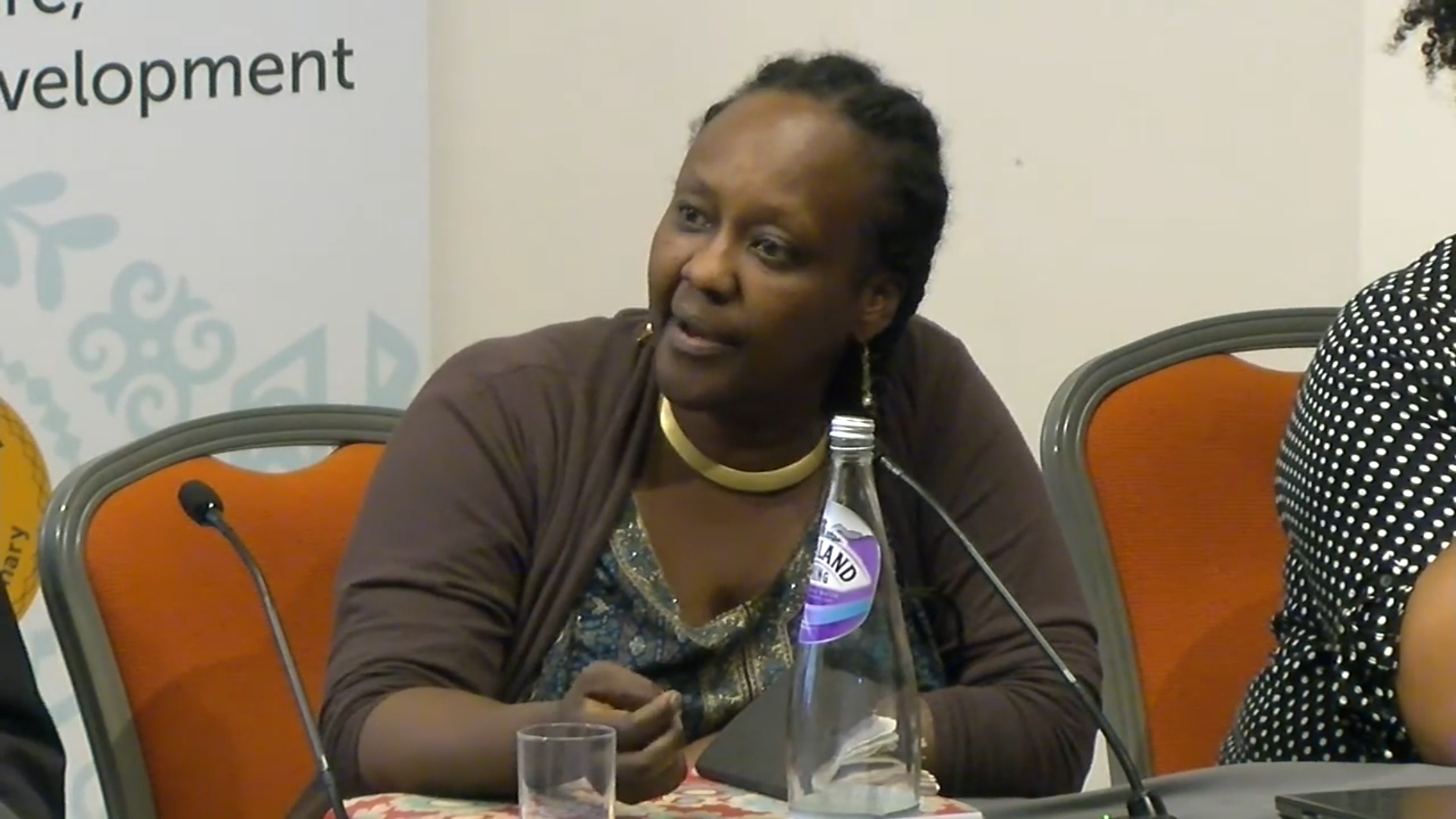
- Judy Kibinge in 2017
- Born: 1967 (age 58–59); Nairobi, Kenya
- Citizenship: Kenyan
- Education: Manchester Polytechnic
- Occupations: Filmmaker; Writer; Producer
- Years active: 1999-till present
- Known for: Establishing DocuBox
- Notable work: Something Necessary

Judy Kibinge (born 1967) is a Kenyan filmmaker, writer and producer. She has produced, written and directed a number of films, best known are Something Necessary (2013), Dangerous Affair (2002), and Project Daddy (2004). She is also known for establishing Docubox, a documentary film fund for African filmmakers to help them produce and distribute their film. She released her first film, The Aftermath, in 2002 and critics have said that she uses her films to impart stories about Kenya, particularly those about women and others that are typically not told in mainstream Hollywood.

Kibinge has been described as a trailblazer for other female Kenyan filmmakers by scholar Clara Giruzzi, to which she has stated that she is just one of the many women who are at the forefront of the rebirth of film in Kenya. She has directed both fiction and non-fiction and Kibinge has been commissioned to make various documentaries, specifically corporate documentaries.

In 2023 Lindiwe Dovey directed a documentary film, Out of the Box: The Screen Worlds of Judy Kibinge, to document the work and impact of Kibinge in the film industry.

== Early life and education ==
Kibinge was born in Nairobi, Kenya in 1967. Her family moved to Washington DC in America in 1969 when she was two. Her family stayed in the US for five years. At the age of 7, she won a children's writing competition in America. She attended The Kenya High School before she moved to UK for her post-secondary education.Kibinge moved to the United Kingdom after growing up in the United States.

For post-secondary education, she attended Malvern Girls College, after which she attended art college in Birmingham. She moved to Manchester, where she attended Manchester Polytechnic and graduated with a Design for Communication Media degree; she never attended a film school.

Before becoming a filmmaker, Kibinge worked in the advertising industry. In 1999 she left the advertising industry to pursue a filmmaking career and began directing commercial documentaries about Monsanto.

== Film career ==
Her films are known as depicting social taboos, violence in developing countries, and romantic comedy. Her film Something Necessary (2013), screened at the 2013 Toronto International Film Festival, is about a woman's struggle of living in Kenya after the elections unrest in 2007. This movie does not only focus on the character's mental states but also helps the world to realize the collapsed situation of Kenya, which started from colonization. She is also known for her documentary film called Coming of Age (2008) which won an award at the Africa Movie Academy Awards in 2009 for Best Short Documentary category. Dangerous Affair (2002) won an award at the Zanzibar Film Festival. Her film often provides real life problems as opposed to fantasy and magical imaginations. However real-life problems she focuses on have a wide range. Her movies can be about personal issues between a couple which audiences can easily relate to, and also they can be about social problems occurring in Africa such as colonialism, war, and hunger. As being known for documentary movies, her film style usually contains many establishing shots, which depict the entire city and people who live there, rather than keep focusing on one person's life. She is a founding member of Kwani Trust, which is an African magazine based in Kenya.

Kibinge began her career at McCann Erickson Kenya for eight years, where she was responsible for numerous award-winning adverts. She was the first black creative director at the company in Kenya. She left McCann Erickson in October 1999 to pursue her career in film. She has written and directed a short film for MNET, and she also produced corporate documentaries for IPPF, Monsanto, and Technoserve. Recently she has been writing a book. She founded DocuBox with funding from the Ford Foundation in order to develop the skills of filmmaking for African filmmakers, as well as provide funding, distribution and production support for documentary filmmakers.

Kibinge runs her own production company titled Seven Productions, through which she has made multiple films such as the 40 minute horror film short Killer Necklace.

In 2017, Kibinge was chosen to be an Oscar judge by the Academy of Motion Picture Arts and Sciences for the categories of documentary, international features and animation.

After more than a decade, Kibinge returned to the director's chair with the narrative short GOAT, which premiered at the Woodstock Film Festival.

== Filmography ==
Filmography
2002	Dangerous Affair	Writer/director
2002	The Aftermath	Director
2004	Project Daddy	Director
2005	Bless This Land	Director
2005	A Voice in the Dark	Producer
2008	Coming of Age	Director
2009	Peace Wanted Alive	Director
2009	Killer Necklace	Director
2011	Tinga Tinga Tales	Writer
2013	Something Necessary	Director
2015	Scarred: The Anatomy of a Massacre	Executive Producer
2019	The Letter	Executive Producer
2020	I Am Samuel	Executive Producer
2021	Joy's Garden	Executive Producer
2025	How to Build a Library	Executive Producer
2025	Khartoum	Executive Producer
2025	GOAT	Director & Executive Producer
2026	Searching for Amani	Consulting Producer

=== Dangerous Affair ===
Kibinge made her directorial debut when a producer who has worked in Hollywood, Njeri Karago asked her to direct a film titled Dangerous Affair. Finance for the film were raised and gained press attention in Kenya as very few films were made there at the time. Kibinge shot the film on a professional video cassette camera and it was distributed by Karago's film company.Dangerous Affair is a love story that tells the life of a young women named Kui who is trained as a New York banker and moves to Kenya and the man she meets in Kenya. It is a romantic comedy about loves, marriages and affairs. The film was shown at one of East Africa's biggest and longest-running film festival, Zanzibar International Film Festival (ZIFF), where it was both well-received and recognized.

=== Scarred: The Anatomy of Massacre ===
Scarred: The Anatomy of Massacre was released in 2015. She uses her advertising background for a "visual hook" within the film. She photographed Wagalla survivors and their scars in a style that resembled a fashion shoot which led to a more dignified shoot for the survivors. She used black and white portraits to establish a human connection between the survivors in the film and the audience watching.

== Awards ==
- 2003: Zanzibar Film Festival – Best East African Production Award: A Dangerous Affair (2002)
- 2007: Kenya International Film Festival – Best Documentary Award: Coming of Age (2008)
- 2009: Kalasha Awards – Best Director: Killer Necklace (2008)
- 2021: Kalasha Awards Lifetime Achiever
- 2021: Kenya Head of State's Commendation Award (HSC)
