= Phoebe Ruguru =

Kenyan film producer (born 1997)

- Born: 1997 (age 28–29); Nakuru, Kenya
- Citizenship: Kenyan
- Education: King’s School (The Cathedral), Peterborough, UK, SOAS, University of London
- Occupations: Enthusiast of International Relations of Africa and Filmmaker
- Awards: Best overall Film Africa | AMVCA Best East Africa Film | AMVCA 2018 Young Achiever's Award 2016 | Women4Africa Young Filmmaker's Award | unchosen Modern-Day Slavery Awards, 2014

Phoebe Ruguru (born 1997) is a Kenyan film producer known for producing the film 18 Hours which won the Best Overall Movie in Africa, at the 2018 AMVCA. This category had never seen a Kenyan film be nominated, and so marked history as the first Kenyan film to be nominated and win in the history of the awards.

== Early life ==
Phoebe Ruguru was born in Kenya and lived with her parents in Nakuru before moving to Limuru with her mother when her parents divorced. Phoebe attended nursery school at a small school called Sunflower and then went to Gramabe Academy in Kabuku, Limuru. She moved to St. Peter's Girls Boarding School in Elburgon, Molo, in her fourth year then to Brook Hill Academy before moving to England at age 11.

In her A-Levels, Phoebe studied at the King’s School (The Cathedral), Peterborough, UK and joined SOAS, University of London to study BA International Relations and Anthropology (Combined degree). She was drawn to the degree course in an effort to develop an understanding of different cultures and concepts she is drawn to, such as equality through female empowerment, education, film and development. Phoebe graduated in July 2018.

== Film Making Career ==
As a young achiever her breakout came when she became the first Kenyan to win an international award in 2014 at the Unchosen Modern Day Slavery Competition held in London. Her film ‘Saidia’ won in the category of ‘The Best Young Filmmaker'. The short film Saidia revolved around a case study of human trafficking. The award winning low budget film was shot purely by an iphone 4s.

== Filmography ==
Year	Title	Role	Category	Ref
2014	Saida	Director	Short film	
2015	Intellectual Scum	Co-Producer	Short film	
2015	Deranged	Producer	Short film	
2016	Plastic Maasai	Producer	Short film	
2017	18 Hours	Producer Assistant Director	Drama Thriller	
2021	Baba Twins	Editor	Comedy Drama	
2022	Namuddu	Producer	Drama	
2022	Safari	Producer	Adventure	
2023	Run Mary Run	Producer	Thriller	
2023	Maid of Honor	Producer	Mystery	
2023	The Lions of Buganda	Editor	Drama	

== International Relations Achievements ==
In October 2015, at just 18 years old, Phoebe was honored as a guest speaker at the House of Lords to deliver a speech on Female Leadership during International Girl Child Day celebrations.

- Winner of `Young Achiever’s Award’ at Women4Africa Award London, 2016.
- Winner of `Young Achiever’s Award’ at African Women in Europe Conference in Geneva, 2015.
- “The Nostalgic Mind of a Young Diaspora Woman’ a book chapter authored by Phoebe is among other chapters in a published book echoing the diaspora experience for African Women in Europe
