= Shirleen Wangari =

Kenyan actress and producer

- Born: Kenya
- Occupations: Actress; Producer; Writer
- Years active: 2000s–present
- Notable work: Sense8; State House; The First Grader; MTV Shuga

Shirleen Wangari is a Kenyan actress, producer, and writer known for her work in film and television, including appearances in international productions such as the Netflix series Sense8 and local television shows including Tahidi High and MTV Shuga. She is also a film producer and founder of Blackwell Films.

== Early life ==
Wangari began acting while still in high school, where she received recognition for her performances in school drama productions.

== Career ==
Wangari started her career as an actress, appearing in Kenyan television series such as Tahidi High, where she gained wider recognition, and in productions including MTV Shuga, State House, and The First Grader. She has also appeared in the Netflix series Sense8.

In addition to acting, Wangari has worked as a writer and producer. She has contributed to several Kenyan film and television projects and is credited as a writer and producer on multiple productions, including short films and television series.

Wangari is also involved in film production through her company, Blackwell Films, focusing on storytelling and content development within the Kenyan film industry.

Her producing work has been recognised within the Kenyan film industry, including being named among award recipients at the Women in Film Awards (WIFA), which recognise the contributions of women filmmakers in Kenya.

== Filmography ==
=== Actress ===
- Tahidi High (television series)
- Sense8 (television series)
- MTV Shuga (television series)
- State House (television series)
- The First Grader (film)

=== Producer and writer ===
- 1992 (2024)
- Zuena (2022)
- Life (2022)

== Recognition ==
Wangari has been recognised within the Kenyan film industry, including receiving an award at the Women in Film Awards (WIFA) in 2025 in the category of Best Producer (Film).
