= List of television stations in Kenya =

This is a list of television stations in Kenya. Since Kenya moved from the analog broadcasting system to the digital television system, there has been tremendous growth in the number of television stations. All of the terrestrial stations in Kenya are broadcast via the DVB T2 digital TV signal format.

== Television stations in Kenya ==
- Truth Wave TV
- Nenyon TV
- MAISHA TV KENYA
- Uvoro TV
- SHAMMAH TV
- M-CHANNEL TV
- TRUTHTV
- MAMLAKA TV
- Africa 24
- Akili Kids!
- 3 Stones TV
- Hope Channel Kenya (HCK)
- Ukombozi tv
- El Shaddai tv
- CGTN Africa
- HOPE TV
- AGAPE LOVE TV
- Citizen TV
- Inooro TV
- K24
- TV47
- LOOK UP TV
- Kenya Broadcasting Corporation
- Kenya Television Network Home
- NTV
- KTN News
- Kass TV
- Endtime TV
- Oracle TV (Oracle Television Network)
- Kameme TV
- Ebru Television
- MBCI TV
- Elevate TV
- CHRISTIAN FAITH TV
- GIKUYU TV
- Shifu TV
- Ongatet TV
- Weru TV
- Oracle TV
- Royal TV
- KTN Burudani TV
- KTN Farmers TV
- Ryde TV
- 5TH Estate
- Heaven Bound TV
- Mwangaza TV
- ZIWA TV, Kenya
- Ushirika TV
- FUMA TV
- RIVERSIDE TV
- Pwani TV
- Romanza+ África
- Kinyeru TV

== See also ==
- Media of Kenya
- List of radio stations in Kenya
- List of newspapers in Kenya
