= Mass media in Kenya =

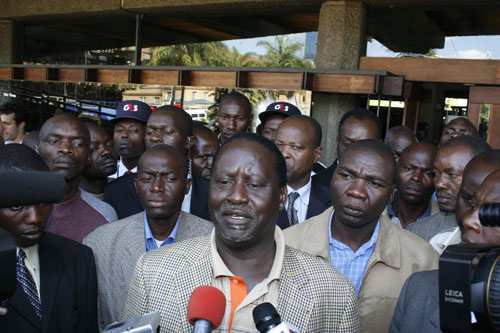
Prime Minister Raila Odinga addressing the Kenyan media during the 2007–08 Kenyan crisis.

Mass media in Kenya includes more than 91 FM stations, more than 64 free to view TV stations, and an unconfirmed number of print newspapers and magazines. Publications mainly use English as their primary language of communication, with some media houses employing Swahili. Vernacular or community-based languages are commonly used in broadcast media; mostly radio.

Kenya's state-owned Kenya Broadcasting Corporation broadcasts in both English and Swahili plus various vernacular languages. Royal Media services are the largest private national broadcaster with 13 radio stations and three TV stations with countrywide coverage. It also broadcasts in both English and Swahili plus various vernacular languages. A dozen private radio and television stations have ranges that are limited to the Nairobi area.

The Government of Kenya started the Kenya Institute of Mass Communication to produce highly skilled personal in the communications and creative art industries. KIMC's training programs have seen significant growth and diversification. 1969 saw the introduction of radio and television production courses in addition to engineering studies. 1970 saw the introduction of print journalism training, and 1975 saw the introduction of cinema production courses. KIMC has developed into one of the most prestigious schools in Africa of its sort, accepting students from other African nations in addition to Kenya.

== Legislation ==
The media in Kenya is regulated by a statutory body called the Media Council of Kenya. The Media Council of Kenya is an independent national institution established by the Media Act, 2007 as the leading institution in the regulation of media and the conduct and discipline of journalists. It is mandated to register and accredit journalists, register media establishments, handle complaints from the public and create and publish yearly media audit on the Media Freedom in Kenya among other things. During accreditation the journalists agree to adhere to the Code of Conduct and Practice of Journalism in Kenya, which was created by media practitioners and stakeholders with the view of making Journalism in Kenya a more professional and respectable field. The media is also regulated by the Kenya Film Classification Board, a State Corporation under the Ministry of Information, Communication and Technology (ICT) which is mandated by the Films and Stage Plays Act Cap 222 Laws of Kenya to regulate the creation, possession, broadcasting, exhibition, and distribution of films in Kenya.

== Radio and audio media ==
KBC, Radio Citizen, Kiss FM (pop), Classic FM (classics), Capital FM (rock and pop), Spice FM, Radio Maisha (broadcasts in Swahili), Easy FM (R&B), Metro FM (Reggae), Homeboyz Radio (Hip-hop and R&B), Vybez FM are the popular radio stations in Kenya in terms of listeners and coverage. Several established private radio stations broadcast in local vernacular languages, including Kameme FM, Gukena FM, Coro FM and Inooro FM (Kikuyu), Metro East FM (Hindi), Chamgei FM, Kass FM and Rehema Radio (Kalenjin), Lake Victoria (Luo), Mulembe FM (Luhya), Mbaitu FM (Kamba), Star FM (Somali).

However most radio are owned by few media companies. They include KBC, Nation Media Group, Standard Media Group, Radio Africa Group, Royal Media Service and Mediamax Network.

In addition to Radio, the largest mobile audio media platform in Kenya is Skiza Ads a service run by Safaricom Plc and Adtones ltd. The Skiza Ads Audio platform enables GDPR compliant targeted geolocated interactive advertising and audio messaging to millions of opted in, profiled mobile users using first party data of Safaricom, the largest telecom provider in Kenya.

== Television ==
NTV, KTN, Citizen TV, TV47 Kenya and K24 are the biggest TV stations in Kenya in terms of coverage and viewers. Recently entertainment TV ventured in the Kenyan airspace with the inclusion of Kiss TV, a 24-hour Music TV Station, and Classic TV which airs African content in terms of movies, programs, and music. But recently they joined together. Inooro TV and Kameme TV are the biggest vernacular TV Station that broadcast their program in Kikuyu. Digital TV is also available in Kenya with the likes of Smart TV and DStv.

More than 100 applications for radio and television licenses are pending before the Communications Authority of Kenya, which is the independent regulatory authority for the communications industry in Kenya. Its role is to license and regulate telecommunications, radio-communication, and postal/courier services in Kenya. Kenya's print media are diverse, ranging from well-respected newspapers and magazines to an expansive tabloid press.

== Newspapers ==
There are two independent national daily newspapers, the Daily Nation, The Standard, and a daily free newspapers and the People Daily. There are also two specialised daily papers, Business Daily and The Star, and one weekly paper, The East African, which is published in Nairobi, Dar es Salaam and Kampala.

Under the Kibaki government, the media have demonstrated greater editorial independence than in previous years, and the number of press freedom abuses have declined. Still, some media policies and incidents continue to inhibit press freedom, e.g., the need to post a costly bond before publication and to register afterward. In 2003 the government invoked a restrictive constitutional provision on-court coverage to intimidate journalists reporting on a possible political murder. In March 2006, hooded policemen raided the offices of The Standard newspaper and Kenya Television Network, claiming concerns about internal security.

== Internet ==
All mainstream media houses have websites that they use to convey news and other information. The use of online magazines, blogs, and websites for Kenyan news is also on the rise.

== Magazine ==
Kenya has several magazines most of which are published monthly and a few are bi-monthly. The magazines cover a range of topics such as business, lifestyle, politics, entertainment, media, and other societal issues. Some famous magazines are Swara and The African executive.

All newspapers published are usually accomplished with a magazine in every daily edition.

Other notable companies also publish magazines for their clients, do publicity and advertisement. Some of these companies are Kenya Airways, Mada Hotels and ICPAK.

All other listed companies in the Nairobi Stock Exchange also publish their annual financial report.

== See also ==
- Telecommunications in Kenya
- Telephone numbers in Kenya

== Bibliography ==
- William A. Hachten (1965). "Press in a One-Party State: Kenya since Independence". Journalism & Mass Communication Quarterly. 42. doi:10.1177/107769906504200211.
- George Githii (1971). "Press Freedom in Kenya". In Olav Stokke (ed.). Reporting Africa. Uppsala: Scandinavian Institute of African Studies. OCLC 878108651.
- Dele Ogunade (1986). "Mass Media Systems of Kenya and Tanzania: a Comparative Analysis". Africa Media Review. 1 (1). Archived from the original on 21 November 2020 – via Michigan State University Libraries, African e-Journals Project.
- A. Owiro-Okoth (1990). "Law and the Mass Media in Kenya". Africa Media Review. 4 (1). Archived from the original on 21 November 2020 – via Michigan State University Libraries, African e-Journals Project.
- Polycarp J. Omolo Ochilo (1993). "Press Freedom and the Role of the Media in Kenya". Africa Media Review. 7 (3). Archived from the original on 21 November 2020 – via Michigan State University Libraries, African e-Journals Project.
- Philip G. Altbach; Edith S. Hoshino, eds. (1995). "Kenya". International Book Publishing: An Encyclopedia. Garland. ISBN 9781134261260.
- "Kenya: Directory: Broadcasting and Communications". Africa South of the Sahara 2003. Regional Surveys of the World. Europa Publications. 2003. p. 540. ISSN 0065-3896.
- Jonathon Green; Nicholas J. Karolides (2005). "Kenya". Encyclopedia of Censorship. Facts on File, Inc. ISBN 978-1-4381-1001-1.
- Winnie V. Mitullah (2012), Freedom of expression in Kenya: Exploring public use of old and new media (PDF), Afrobarometer – via Eidgenössische Technische Hochschule Zürich, Center for Security Studies
- Historical Dictionary of Kenya (3rd ed.). Rowman & Littlefield. 2014. ISBN 978-0-8108-7469-5. (Includes information about radio, periodicals, etc.)
- "Kenya", Freedom of the Press, USA: Freedom House, 2016, archived from the original on 30 October 2018
- "Kenya", Digital News Report, UK: Reuters Institute for the Study of Journalism, University of Oxford, 2020, OCLC 854746354
