= Telecommunications in Kenya =

Telecommunications in Kenya include radio, television, fixed and mobile telephones, and the Internet.

== Radio and television ==
Radio stations:

- state-owned radio broadcaster operates 2 national radio channels and provides regional and local radio services in multiple languages; a large number of private radio stations, including provincial stations broadcasting in local languages; transmissions of several international broadcasters are available (2007);
- 24 AM, 8 FM, and 6 shortwave (2001).

Radios: 3.07 million (1997).

Television stations:

- roughly a half-dozen privately owned TV stations and a state-owned TV broadcaster that operates 2 channels; satellite and cable TV subscription services available (2007);
- 8 stations (2002).

Television sets: 730,000 (1997).

Television is the main news source in cities and towns. TV in rural areas is limited by lack of reliable electricity and radio listening dominates in rural areas, where most Kenyans live. A switchover to digital TV is under way. Satellite pay-TV is offered by the Wananchi Group, which operates Zuku TV, and by South Africa's MultiChoice. Entertainment, music and phone-ins dominate the radio scene, which includes Islamic stations and stations broadcasting in local languages.

The BBC World Service is available in Nairobi, Mombasa, and Kisumu.

The state-run Kenya Broadcasting Corporation (KBC) is funded from advertising revenue and from the government.

=== Most viewed channels ===
Position	Channel	Share of total viewing (%)
1	Citizen TV	24.0
2	NTV	9.4
3	KTN	8.7
4	KTN News	7.9
5	K24	6.8
6	Maisha Magic East	6.1
7	Inooro TV	4.9
8	KBC	4.2
9	Al Jazeera	3.9
10	Kass TV	3.3

== Telephones ==
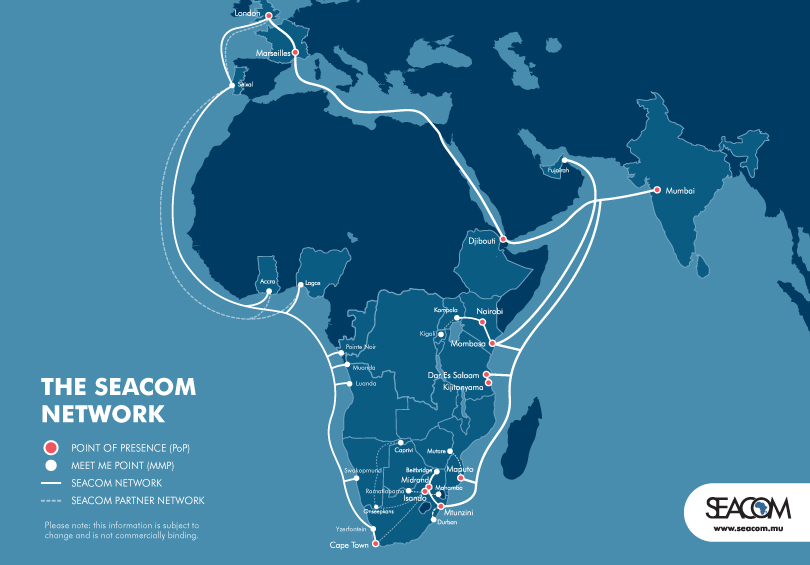
SEACOM-Network Map. Click on map to enlarge.

Calling code: +254

International call prefix: 000

Main lines:

- 251,600 lines in use, 124th in the world (2012);
- 320,000 lines in use (2007).

Mobile Cellular:

- 59.8 million lines as at September 2020

Telephone system: inadequate; fixed-line telephone system is small and inefficient; trunks are primarily microwave radio relay; business data commonly transferred by a very small aperture terminal (VSAT) system; sole fixed-line provider, Telkom Kenya, is slated for privatization; multiple providers in the mobile-cellular segment of the market fostering a boom in mobile-cellular telephone usage with teledensity reaching 65 per 100 persons (2011).

Communications cables: landing point for the Eastern Africa Submarine Cable System (EASSy), The East African Marine System (TEAMS), and SEACOM fiber-optic submarine cable systems (2011).

Satellite earth stations: 4 Intelsat (2011).

== Internet ==
Top-level domain: .ke

Internet users:

- 13.8 million users, 35th in the world; 32.1% of the population, 129th in the world (2012);
- 4.0 million users, 59th in the world (2009);
- 3.0 million users (2008);
- 500,000 users (2002).

Fixed broadband: 43,013 subscriptions, 115th in the world; 0.1% of the population, 167th in the world (2012).

Wireless broadband: 954,896 subscriptions, 72nd in the world; 2.2% of the population, 124th in the world (2012).

Internet hosts: 71,018 hosts, 88th in the world (2012).

IPv4: 1.7 million addresses allocated, 68th in the world, less than 0.05% of the world total, 38.5 addresses per 1000 people (2012).

Internet service providers: 66 ISPs (2014).

=== Internet censorship and surveillance ===
Kenya was rated as "partly free" in the 2009 and 2011 Freedom on the Net reports from Freedom House with scores of 34 and 32 which is much closer to the "free" rating that ends at 30 then it is to the "not free" rating that starts at 60. In 2012 and 2013 the rating improved to "free" with scores of 29 and 28.

The government does not employ technical filtering or any administrative censorship system to restrict access to political or other content. Citizens engage in the peaceful expression of views via the Internet, including by e-mail, and are able to access a wide range of viewpoints, with the websites of the British Broadcasting Corporation (BBC), the U.S.-based Cable News Network (CNN), and Kenya's Daily Nation newspaper the most commonly accessed. There are no government restrictions on access to the Internet, but Internet services are limited in rural areas due to lack of infrastructure.

The constitution protects freedom of expression and the "freedom to communicate ideas and information." However, it also grants the government the authority to punish defamation, protect privileged information, and restrict state employees’ "freedom of expression in the interest of defense, public safety, public order, public morality or public health." In January 2009, the government passed a controversial Communications Amendment Act that established that any person who publishes, transmits, or causes to be published in electronic form obscene information commits an offense. The Act also outlines other forms of illegality associated with the use of information and communication technologies. At the end of 2010, the measure had not been used to prosecute anyone for online expression. Under the Act, the Communications Commission of Kenya (CCK), rather than the independent Media Council of Kenya, is responsible for regulating both traditional and online media. The CCK is also independent, but because the CCK has yet to make any decisions affecting the internet, its autonomy and professionalism in making determinations remain to be seen.

In July 2009 the government announced that all cell phone users had to provide the government with their name and identification number. This regulation applies to citizens who access the Internet through cell phone-based services as well.

On 18 May 2018, the Kenya Film Classification Board issued a warning stating that any video intended for public exhibition, including video published online, falls under the Films and Stage Plays Act, and that the creators of such videos must obtain a licence from the KFCB or be subject to fines or imprisonment.

== See also ==
- Kenya Internet Exchange (KIXP).
- Media of Kenya
- Terrestrial fibre optic cable projects in Kenya
