= Chipukeezy =

Kenyan comedian, radio presenter, and MC (born 1990)

- Born: Vincent Mwasia Mutua; November 1, 1990 (age 35); Machakos County
- Education: East African School of Media Studies
- Notable work: Chipukeezy Show

Comedy career
- Years active: 2013–present

Vincent Mwasia Mutua (born November 1, 1990), known professionally as Chipukeezy, is a Kenyan comedian, radio presenter, and MC. He rose to prominence when he joined the cast of the Churchill Show in 2013. In 2018, he ventured into hosting his own show, the Chipukeezy Show, which aired on Ebru TV until 2019. In 2021, he was elected as the vice chairperson of the National Authority for the Campaign Against Drug Abuse.

== Early life and education ==
After high school, he participated in local theater productions, acting in adaptations of popular literary works. He gained recognition as the warm seat narrator for the entertainment show Heartstrings, with eight appearances, and was invited twice to the hot seat for two-hour segments.

He later joined East African School of Media Studies.

== Career ==
In 2013, Chipukeezy joined the Churchill Show, a renowned comedy show that aired on NTV. He established a notable presence through his performances and became a regular participant in subsequent episodes.

Chipukeezy hosted East Africa's Comedy Tuesday, a notable comedy event held at the Kenya National Theatre in Nairobi in 2016. The event featured a lineup of East African comedians, including Eric Omondi, Dr Ofweneke, Eddie Butita, Idris Sultan, and Captain Khalid from Tanzania.

He later departed from Churchill Show and embarked on a new venture by establishing his own television show, titled Chipukeezy Show, which aired on the Kenyan TV channel Ebru TV. It garnered substantial success, spanning multiple seasons and serving as a platform for Kenyan youth and artists. It played a pivotal role in catapulting the careers of artists such as Stevo Simple Boy. In 2019, a disagreement arose between Chipukeezy and Ebru TV, prompting the show to make a transition to TV47 Kenya.

Chipukeezy co-hosted the 2017 African Muzik Magazine Awards, alongside Nigerian Comedian Basketmouth in Dallas.

In 2018, Chipukeezy was appointed as a member of the board of directors at the National Authority for the Campaign Against Drug Abuse (NACADA) by the then Kenyan President Uhuru Kenyatta. In 2021, Chipukeezy was elected the vice chairperson of the Authority.

He was nominated for the Best Africa's Comedian Category alongside Eric Omondi at the African Entertainment Awards USA (AEUSA) in 2018.

In 2021, Chipukeezy embarked on "The Celebrity Fish Tour USA," a tour held in the United States and hosted by Nigerian comedian Patrick Onyeke. It spanned four months and featured performances by a group of African comedians. On the tour, Chipukeezy had the opportunity to meet and engage with renowned American comedians, such as Katt Williams and Mark Curry. In 2023, he relaunched the ChipukeezyShow.

== Personal life ==
In 2018, Chipukeezy and his fiancé Vivian Mandera, popularly known as Empress Kerry, ended their engagement and parted ways after a three-year relationship.

His grandfather, Kilian Kakonzi Kithui, died in 2019. The news of his grandfather's death was met with condolences from various individuals, including the then Deputy President William Ruto.
