= Kobi Kihara =

Former Kenyan media personality

- Born: 1982 (age 43–44); Nairobi, Kenya
- Citizenship: Kenya
- Occupations: Media personality, photographer, TV presenter, producer
- Known for: Hosting: Power Breakfast, AM Live and Better Living. Judge on Royco Fuata Flava

Kobi Kihara (born 1982) is a former Kenyan media personality, photographer, mentor, producer and TV presenter. She has worked with several Kenyan media stations and hosted programmes including Power Breakfast, AM Live, Better Living and was a judge on Royco Fuata Flava.

== Early life and education ==
Kihara was born in Onyonka Estate in Lang'ata, Nairobi. She attended Loreto Convent Valley Road before relocating to Washington, DC with her family at the age of 15. She later attended to a private high school in Virginia.

After highschool, she went to the United Kingdom to pursue Bachelor's Degree in Performing Arts and Theatre at Northumbria University. She later pursued Master's Degree in Film and Television Production in Canada at the University of Toronto.

== Career ==
While she was still in the United States, Kenyan media veteran Tom Mshindi informed Kihara of a job opening at a local media house. After returning to Kenya, she was unable to secure the job she wanted as a producer. As a fallback plan, she started doing commercial work as she had her camera and equipments.

In 2007, Kihara joined Citizen Tv where she co-hosted Power Breakfast alongside Jimmy Gathu. After three years, she left the station and joined Radio Africa Group where she worked both as a news anchor and reporter to KISS FM and KISS TV.

In 2013, Kihara joined NTV where she co-hosted the AM Live Show alongside Sheila Mwanyigha and Debarl Inea.

In 2016, She founded Girl Inspired, an initiative to guide and inspire young women across Kenya.

In June 2018, Kihara announced her departure from NTV to pursue fashion design studies at Parsons School of Design in New York. She was also selected as a brand ambassador for Luxuria Lifestyle, a UK based magazine.

== Controversy ==
In August 2018, Kihara faced public criticism after social media users discovered a photograph of a salad she had posted on Instagram originated from another website. Users subsequently questioned the aunthenticity of other photographs on her account, accusing her of faking her ifestyle. As criticism intensified, Kihara eventually responded and apologized for misleading people.

Following the backlash, Kihara deactivated all her social media accounts.

In the years since, Kihara has maintained a low public profile.
