= List of newspapers in Kenya =

This is a list of newspapers in Kenya.

== List of newspapers ==
City	Newspaper	Publisher/parent company	Website
Nairobi	The Daily Nation	Nation Media Group	
Nairobi	The Standard	Standard Group Limited	
Nairobi	The EastAfrican	Nation Media Group	
Nairobi	The Sub-Saharan Informer (defunct)		
Nairobi	Taifa Leo	Nation Media Group	(in Swahili)
Nairobi	Business Daily	Nation Media Group	
Nairobi	The Star	Radio Africa Group	
Nairobi	People Daily	Mediamax Network Limited	

== See also ==
- Media of Kenya
- List of radio stations in Kenya
- Telecommunications in Kenya

== Bibliography ==
- James F. Scotton (1975). "Press in Kenya a Decade after Independence; Patterns of Readership and Ownership". Gazette. 21: 19–33. doi:10.1177/001654927502100102. S2CID 144614322.
- "Kenya: Directory: the Press". Africa South of the Sahara 2004. Regional Surveys of the World. Europa Publications. 2004. p. 574+. ISBN 1857431839.
- "Kenya", Freedom of the Press, USA: Freedom House, 2016
- Duncan Omanga (2016). "'I will decide who will speak': street parliaments and the newspaper ecology in Eldoret's Kamukunji". In Derek Peterson; et al. (eds.). African Print Cultures: Newspapers and Their Publics in the Twentieth Century. University of Michigan Press. ISBN 978-0-472-05317-9. (About Eldoret)
- Reuters Institute for the Study of Journalism, University of Oxford (2020), "Kenya", Digital News Report, UK, OCLC 854746354
