= Wanjiku the Teacher =

Kenyan comedian

Wanjìkū the Teacher
- Born: Caroline Wanjìkū; Nairobi County
- Education: Mass Communication.
- Notable work: Churchill Show
- Spouse: Victor Ber (after 2014)

Comedy career
- Years active: Since 2007
- Medium: Television, comedy
- Genre: Comedy
- Subject: Various
- Website: wanjikutheteacher.com

Carolyne Wanjìkū Tharaū, most commonly known as Wanjiku the Teacher or Teacher Wanjiku, is a Kenyan comedian, actress and producer.

She is the founder and CEO of Mwalimu Production, a content creating company where the character Teacher Wanjiku is improved and animated specifically for children.

== Career ==
Wanjikū started the character of Teacher Wanjikū in a Heartstrings play called 43rd Kenyan tribe in 2007. She received critical acclaim and went ahead to take part in other set book plays and worked on more than 30 plays while being aided by directors Sammy Mwangi and Victor Ber, who later became her husband.

Her big break came when she did her first stand-up comedy performance at the Churchill Show in 2013 getting more than 200,000 YouTube views and more offers thereafter. She has since then appeared on a number of stages in Kenya and abroad including The Hot Seat and so on. She was popularly known for her acts on 'Teacher Wanjiku' and 'Wa John'. She left Churchill Show in 2014 after her contract expired and came back as a guest performer when the show was celebrating 15 years which was also Daniel's 40th birthday.

She had her first television debut on Citizen TV in 2014 after leaving Churchill Show. Her show Teacher Wanjikū debuted on Citizen TV in the same week as Ugandan comedian Anne Kansiime's Don't Mess With Kansiime. Her show was however scrapped off citing production standards. She then took a break from live performance to go have her baby. She came back with a one man show at National theatre in 2016 and was a success.

Wanjìkū has been brand ambassador for a number of brands including Airtel, Airtel Money, Unilever's Blue Band, Honda, Bata, USAID, National Bank and many others. She became a Dettol Ambassador after former ambassadors Julie Gichuru, Lulu Hassan and Patience Ozokwor. She also worked in the office of the president, at nation media group as a radio presenter at Q FM, Kenya Literature Bureau educating children about sexuality, USAID promoting police reforms, and Theirworld film campaign .

In 2017, Wanjìkū appeared in Theirworld's #5for5 campaign to show the importance of early childhood development. The campaign also featured other notable names like Rainn Wilson, Jackie Tohn, Matt Lucas, Wendy Liebman, Shappi Khorsandi and Nish Kumar

== Teacher Wanjiku (character) ==
Wanjìkū the teacher's character is shaped and acted by Caroline Wanjìkū herself. The character is a teacher heavily influenced by her mother tongue. She dresses mostly almost as a clown in a dotted dress and big transparent eyeglasses. Caroline Wanjiku has been writing scripts for the character and performed the character live and on television mostly in Swahili and directed by her manager, director and husband Victor Ber.

== Acclaim ==
Wanjìkū has been well received by the comedy audiences in Kenya and has been called Kenya's fastest rising comedian as well as Kenya's Queen of Comedy.

== Shows ==
- The 11 Commandments
- Teacher Wanjiku (Citizen TV)
- The Churchill Show
- My Advice is
- The Only Lie That Works
- Girls are also funny (NTV Kenya)

== Personal life ==
Wanjìkū was born and raised in Nairobi County and is the fourth born in a family of six. She got married in December 2014 to creative director, producer and her manager Victor Ber in a private ceremony at St. Pauls Catholic Church, University Way, Nairobi.
