= Claudia Naisabwa =

Kenyan media personality and actress

- Born: September 4, 2002 (age 24); Kenya
- Education: Daystar University
- Occupations: Media personality; actress; singer; events host
- Years active: 2021–present

Claudia Naisabwa (born September 4, 2002) is a Kenyan media personality, actress, entertainer, and events host. She has presented programs on Nation FM and NTV Kenya, hosted the Showmax reality series Take Me Home, and served as master of ceremonies at sports, corporate, fashion and entertainment events across Africa, including tour in UK with Rayvanny (2024), Cantina Fiesta in Uganda (2025), inaugural WAV Festival in Cape Town and the 9th edition of AFRIMA in Lagos Nigeria (2026).

== Early life and education ==
Naisabwa was born on September 4, 2002, in Kenya and is a member of the Samburu community. She attended Daystar University, where she studied communication from 2018 to 2022.

== Career ==
=== Broadcasting ===
Naisabwa began her media career in 2021 at SPM Buzz, an online media outlet. She joined KTN Kenya later that year, where she hosted the programs Str8up and Iwake Show. She departed from KTN in January 2024, marking her third anniversary in media.

In 2024, she moved to Nation FM, co-hosting the mid-morning show Vibe Shift with Brian Aseli. In 2025, she transitioned to TV47 and NTV Kenya, co-hosting Friday Night Rave on NTV, a late-night entertainment program featuring music and celebrity interviews.

In 2025, she hosted the second season of the Showmax reality series Take Me Home.

=== Events hosting ===
Naisabwa has hosted over 100 events throughout her career. Notable events include Miss Universe Kenya (2024), Miss World Kenya (2022), the Pulse Music Video Awards (2021, 2022), People's Choice Awards Kenya (2022, 2023), and the Talanta Hela launch at State House with President William Ruto (2023). She has also hosted the YouthConnekt Africa Summit (2023) and the Nairobi Festival (2023).

In November 2025, she embarked on a multi-country tour with stops in Arusha Tanzania, Kampala, Uganda for the Don Julio Cantina Fiesta, Nigeria for the 9th AFRIMA in Lagos, and Cape Town, South Africa for the inaugural WAV Festival.

=== Acting and music ===
Naisabwa appeared in the 2024 music video for Rayvanny's song "Down". As a singer and songwriter, she has collaborated with artists including Kash Pleen and Shuajo Blake.

=== Advocacy ===
In 2024, Naisabwa launched the CN Initiative, through which she conducts workshops on mental health, body positivity, and creative entrepreneurship for young women in Kenya, reaching over 500 participants in Nairobi and Mombasa. She has advocated against teenage pregnancy and served as an ambassador for International Youth Week in 2023. In 2025, she discussed her experiences with burnout and isolation in media interviews.

== Image and Influence in Pop Culture ==
Scholars and journalists have described Claudia Naisabwa as one of the most prominent pop superstars of East Africa’s Gen Z era.

Her approach to the mainstream music industry has established her reputation as a savvy businesswoman, particularly through remixes of her dance challenge videos on TikTok, which reflect emerging trends in music marketing, by strategically placing such sounds within her daily video reels and carousels on Instagram and Snapchat.

Naisabwa's work in event hosting as 'hype gal' has contributed to the increased visibility of Afrobeats, House music, Bongo Flava and Amapiano genres outside Africa, reaching the adolescent audience and other demographics previously underrepresented in these styles.

In 2024, she toured the United Kingdom alongside Tanzanian artist Rayvanny during which her choice of denim wear and crop tops was noted by fashion police critics for coinciding with rising sales of similar clothing merchandise among women, a phenomenon referred to as the "Claudia Naisabwa Force".

Her dynamic presence across radio, television, digital platforms, commercial endorsements, and live events has been seen as a catalyst in the rise of poptimism, with her career transitions influencing a new wave of digital market programming.

During and following the COVID-19 period, Naisabwa's public image drew significant commentary, with tabloids portraying her as "Kenya’s vibes ambassador" and a "media darling." Her approachable, girl-next-door demeanor, polite interactions, open-hearted conversations, and expressive-bold fashion projected a distinctly restrained persona, distinguishing her from contemporaries. This modest, subtle, but sophisticated appeal formed the core of her relatability.

She gained early prominence through makeup tutorials and live Facebook and Instagram short videos addressing post puberty themes, elements that solidified her status as a teen idol among young audiences. As Naisabwa recalibrated her career toward fashion, sports, content creation, entertainment, and broader media roles, her popularity transcended traditional confines across genres, eras, paradigms, and trends.

Claudia's appeal, especially among the “cool kids” audience, has positioned her as an emblem of her generation's zeitgeist. Brian Muhumuza Bishanga, editor-at-large at BM Publications, referenced Claudia’s virality as one that stems from “Control of the industry trends, narrative and intentional personal branding" via strategic controversy and privacy management. Naisabwa's impact often draw comparisons not only to peers but also to industry established figures such as Gayle King, Porsha Williams, Khanyi Mbau, Toke Makinwa, and Bonang Matheba.

== Awards and nominations ==
Year	Award	Category	Result
2022	People's Choice Awards Kenya	Best Female MC	Won
2023	Africa Women Awards	Outstanding TV Personality	Won
2023	Pulse Influencer Awards	Media Blogger	Nominated
2023	Tamasha Awards	Fashion Influencer of the Year	Won
2024	Pulse Influencer Awards	Africa's Most Influential Fashionista	Won
2024	TUKO Entertainment Awards	Most Fashionable Celebrity	Won
2024	East Africa Awards	Media Personality of the Year	Won
2024	East Africa Awards	Events Excellence Brand of the Year	Won
2025	Grand Fashion Awards Kenya	Most Fashionable Female MC	Won
2026	Forty Under 40 Awards Africa	Journalism	Nominated
