= Lulu Hassan =

Kenyan journalist, news anchor and television producer

- Born: 24 April 1983 (age 43); Mombasa, Kenya
- Citizenship: Kenya
- Occupations: Journalist; News Presenter; Television Producer
- Years active: 2007 - Present
- Employer: Royal Media
- Known for: News broadcasting and Telenovela production
- Notable work: Maria (TV series); Aziza; Zora (TV series); Huba
- Spouse(s): Rashid Abdalla, 2009 – present
- Website: https://jiffypictures.co.ke/

Lulu Khadija Hassan (born 24 April 1983) is a Kenyan journalist, news anchor, producer, and CEO of Jiffy Pictures. She co-hosts the Nipashe Wikendi news bulletin on Citizen TV alongside Rashid Abdalla. The Swahili-language bulletin airs on Saturday and Sunday.

Lulu Hassan and Rashid Abdalla, one of Kenya's prominent media couples, founded Jiffy Pictures in 2016.

Hassan began her career earlier at Radio Salaam, joining the station at 20 years old after applying for a position as a part-time English newscaster. She secured the job and simultaneously enrolled in media school.

Hassan eventually secured her first TV role as a Swahili newscaster on KTN, while Rashid Abdalla became a news anchor at NMG's now-defunct Swahili TV station, QTV. When QTV shut down, Abdalla transitioned to NTV as a Swahili news anchor.

During their time on air, they conceived the idea for Jiffy Pictures, a production house focused on creating dramatic Swahili telenovelas for local audiences. The couple took on roles in scriptwriting, talent scouting, and executive producing the shows. In 2016, they established the company's social media presence, and by 2017, they secured their first project greenlight from Multichoice for the show "Maza."

Lulu and Rashid reunited on air in 2018 when Rashid joined Citizen TV from NTV. Their chemistry, combined with the unique appeal of a couple co-anchoring news bulletins, won over fans and led to brand endorsement opportunities.

== Early life ==
Lulu was born in Mombasa County and attended Aga Khan Academy. After her initial education, she received training in various roles related to the travel industry at Salrene Travel Operations College. She began her career in media as a radio broadcaster at Radio Salaam in Mombasa before pursuing further studies in Communication and Journalism.

== Career ==
Lulu Hassan's journalism career began as a radio host at Radio Salaam where she worked as a news presenter in English by 2008. Her break into television came when a KTN cameraman informed her of vacancies due to two Swahili anchors going on maternity leave. She auditioned for the role and was ultimately hired by KTN Television as a news anchor.

Later, Lulu moved to Royal Media Services and currently co-hosts the Nipashe Wikendi with Rashid Abdalla on Citizen TV.

Lulu Hassan is the CEO and founder of Jiffy Pictures, a film production house she owns with her husband, Rashid Abdalla. Jiffy Pictures has gained recognition for producing programs for local TV stations and on-demand streaming platforms such as MultiChoice's DStv and Showmax. Hassan is also a producer on many of the series produced by Jiffy Pictures, which include Maria, Sultana, Zora, Moyo and Aziza on Citizen TV, Huba on Maisha Magic Bongo, Kovu on Showmax, and Maza on Maisha Magic East. In 2018, Maza was nominated for Best TV Drama and Best Lead Actress at the Kalasha Awards. These series are particularly popular in Kenya and Tanzania, where Swahili is the main language.

== Personal life ==
Lulu Hassan married Rashid Abdalla, a Swahili presenter at Citizen TV, in 2009. The couple met while working at Radio Salaam in Mombasa.

== Awards and nominations ==
- Lulu was crowned "Mwanamke Wa Shoka Hapa." (Woman of Inspiration) in East Africa at the 2022 Mwanamke wa Shoka awards organized by Tanzanian media house EFM and TVE.
- Lulu was awarded the Best Movie/Series Producer of the Year in Africa at the 2022 ZIKOMO Awards. The international awards gala was held in Zambia.
- Lulu Hassan, through her production company Jiffy Pictures, won the Best Producer Award (TV Drama - Maria) at the 2021 Women in Film Awards ceremony.
