= Radio Africa (disambiguation) =

Radio Africa is an album by the Russian band Aquarium.

Radio Africa may also refer to:

- SW Radio Africa, a Zimbabwe radio station
- "Radio Africa" (1985 song) and Radio Africa (1993 album), by British band Latin Quarter
- Radio Africa, a 2010 album by the South African band Freshlyground
- "Radio Africa", a 1985 song by Tullio De Piscopo
- Radio Africa Group, a newspaper publisher; see The Star (Kenya)
