= MC Jessy =

Kenyan comedian and television host

Jasper Muthomi
- Born: Meru County
- Education: Daystar University
- Notable work: Host of Churchill Raw
- Children: 1

Comedy career
- Years active: 2011 — present
- Genres: Stand-up comedy; Observational comedy

Jasper Muthomi, professionally known as MC Jessy, is a Kenyan comedian, television host, and media personality. He rose to prominence through his work on the Churchill Show and as the host of its spin-off program Churchill Raw.

== Early life ==
Jasper was born in Meru County. He completed his primary education in Embu County. On the eve of his Kenya Certificate of Primary Education (KCPE) exams in 1999, his mother died, leaving him orphaned at age 12. The loss disrupted his studies, forcing him to take a year away from formal education. He eventually resumed schooling when his aunt sponsored his enrollment at St. Cyprian Boys High School in Meru, where he developed his public speaking skills. After graduating, he pursued a Bachelor’s degree in Communications at Daystar University, funded by another benefactor.

== Career ==
Jessy's career began in radio, influenced by Kenyan broadcasters like Jeff Mwangemi and John Karani. Following internships at Standard Media Group and KTN, where he was mentored by journalist Larry Madowo, he transitioned to comedy. His breakthrough followed a chance encounter with comedian Daniel "Churchill" Ndambuki at a Nairobi restaurant, where Churchill invited him to audition for Churchill Show, leading to his debut in Season 2, Episode 36. He gained prominence in 2011 after joining the comedy show Churchill Show. His Meru-influenced humor resonated with audiences, leading to co-hosting opportunities. In 2012, he became the host of Churchill Raw, a spin-off focused on showcasing new comedic talent. He hosted the show until its conclusion in 2019, mentoring numerous comedians who later achieved their own success.

In 2020, Jessy launched Jessy Junction on KTN, a program incorporating skits, interviews, and social commentary. The show aimed to provide a platform for grassroots talent and address social issues.

Jessy transitioned into politics in 2022, initially seeking the United Democratic Alliance (UDA) party nomination for the South Imenti parliamentary seat. After withdrawing from UDA, he ran as an independent candidate but was not successful. Following the election, he briefly hosted a show on NRG Radio in 2023 before returning to comedy and advocacy work. He has advocated for greater support of Kenya's creative economy, including the establishment of a government-backed Creative Economy Council.

Beyond his entertainment work, Jessy founded the Jessy Foundation in 2021, which focuses on youth mentorship in Meru County. He has also supported education initiatives, including donations to his alma mater, St. Cyprian Boys High School.

== Influences ==
Jessy credits Daniel "Churchill" Ndambuki as his primary mentor, stating, “Churchill gave me a platform to grow”. He also cites American comedians Chris Rock atev, whose styles he studied under the guidance of Pastor David Adeoye at Winners’ Chapel Nairobi. Early influences include Kenyan radio hosts, whose on-air personas inspired his comedic delivery.

== Personal life ==
Jessy got married in 2010.

A self-described “student of history,” Jessy is pursuing a Master’s degree in Political Science, delayed by the COVID-19 pandemic. He maintains close ties to Meru Governor Kiraitu Murungi, whom he regards as a political role model.

== Work ==
=== Television ===
Year	Title	Role	Notes
2011	Churchill Show	Himself	10 seasons
2012	Churchill Raw	Himself (As Host)	9 seasons
2020	Jessy Junction	Himself (As Host)	KTN

=== Stand-up comedy ===
Jessy performs at corporate events and comedy festivals, blending observational humor with cultural satire. His routines often address Kenyan politics and everyday life.

=== Hosting ===
Beyond television, Jessy emcees major events, including the Groove Awards and Nairobi Comedy Festival.
