= Adam to Eve =

2025 Kenyan Showmax dramedy

- Genre: Comedy drama
- Written by: Alex Konstantaras; Yafesi Musioke; Serah Mwihaki; Rose Njoroge; Lily Wanjiku; Tony Koros; George Salt
- Directed by: Alex Konstantaras; Aggie Nyagari
- Starring: Blessing Lungaho; Ellah Maina; Celestine Gachuhi; Mathew Ngugi; Gashiki Gashiki; Mucheru Kamau; Eddie Mbugua; Marya Okoth; Robert Agengo; Winnie Anyango; Chris Kamau; Rose Njoroge
- Country of origin: Kenya
- Original languages: English; Swahili
- No. of seasons: 1
- No. of episodes: 26 (list of episodes)

Production
- Producers: Lizz Njagah; Alex Konstantaras
- Production company: Historia Films

Original release
- Network: Showmax
- Release: 26 November 2025 – present

Adam to Eve is a Kenyan dramedy television series produced by Historia Films for African streamer Showmax. The series stars Blessing Lungaho as Adam, a carefree Nairobi playboy whose life takes a dramatic turn when a mysterious curse transforms him into a woman.

The show is helmed by filmmakers Lizz Njagah and Alex Konstantaras, known for their work on House of Lungula.

Adam to Eve premiered on 26 November 2025 with new episodes dropping every Wednesday.

== Plot ==
The story follows Adam (Blessing Lung'aho), a charming Nairobi playboy who lives in the fast lane, treating women as disposable objects without consequence. His world is suddenly turned upside down when a mysterious curse transforms him into a woman named Eve. Now forced to navigate life in a completely new body and perspective, Adam/Eve must confront the true impact of their past actions and their deep-seated misogyny.

To reclaim his original life, they must team up with their introverted twin brother. Together, they embark on a journey of good deeds, redemption, and self-discovery.

== Cast ==
- Blessing Lung'aho as Adam/Makori. Blessing plays three roles including Adam, a Nairobi playboy who is transformed into a woman by a mysterious curse. Adam, now in his 30s, stands out as a leading real estate agent in Nairobi and epitomizes the classic playboy archetype. He is confident, though this comes off as self-centeredness, making him less adept at interpersonal relationships. When he transforms into Eve, he's forced to confront his feminine side and make amends for past wrongs, leading to a profound personal transformation. Makori is Adam's geeky twin brother. Makori lives together with Adam and their shared experiences become essential when Adam turns into Eve.
- Ellah Maina as Eve. Eve is Adam in a woman's body. They share the same mind, instincts, and impulses, now navigating the world through an entirely different form. She tries to adapt to behaving “like a woman,” but her masculine mannerisms constantly clash with how everyone perceives her. This mismatch creates both comedic tension and emotional challenges, forcing Eve to confront the social realities women face every day.
- Winnie Anyango as Acholi, the enigmatic part time household assistant of the twins. Her interactions with the twins are marked by awkwardness and tension. The twins find it challenging to open up to her, leading them to keep their extraordinary secret hidden. She likes doing Zumba dance, singing and listening to true crime podcasts.
- Mucheru Kamau as Kevo, one of Adam's colleagues at the real estate agency. He used to be the alpha male in the office, but things changed when Adam came along. When Adam “disappears”, Kevo thinks it's a good chance to take back his top spot. But when Eve shows up as Adam's replacement, Kevo gets really suspicious and keeps bothering her.
- Celestine Gachuhi as Amanda. She is the Executive Assistant to Mr Babu. She dresses suggestively to get ahead. She wants to become a realtor but the male dominant environment does not help her.
- Chris Kamau as Mr. Babu. The boss at Adam's real estate agency.
- Kieran Ratanya as Michael.
- Mathew Ngugi as Jackson, one of Adam's colleagues at the real estate agency.
- Gashiki Gashiki as Mrs Obama. The HR boss at Adam's real estate agency. She is a super distant relative of Obama and she never lets anyone forget it.
- Marya Okoth as Stacy. She is a receptionist at Adam's real estate agency. She was asked to do a social media post three years ago and since then she calls herself the social media manager despite never being promoted. She is a sucker for romance but she always goes for the wrong guys.
- Kevin Ogutu as Sylvanas, your typical nosy askari who wants to help all the time and wants to know everything. He flirts with Acholi and even with Eve when she appears.
- Robert Agengo as M-DEP. He is multi-dimensional element physician and witchdoctor.
- Rose K. Njoroge as Tasha. Makori's love interest. She is also techy and geeky but more outgoing than him. She is pushing his limits.
- Gerald Langiri

== Series overview ==
Season	Episodes	Originally released	
Season	Episodes	First released	Last released
1	26	November 26, 2025	Ongoing

=== Season 1 (2025) ===
No.	Title	Directed by	Original release date
1	"Episode 1"	Alexandros Konstantaras	26 November 2025
A mysterious figure seeks a witch doctor's help targeting Adam, a carefree playboy. One night, something unimaginable happens, throwing Adam's life into chaos.
2	"Episode 2"	Alexandros Konstantaras	3 December 2025
Adam's life takes a shocking turn after a mysterious transformation. Things spiral out of control at home with his brother Makori and at work.
3	"Episode 3"	Alexandros Konstantaras	10 December 2025
Makori and Adam try various methods to reverse the curse. Mdep shows them the way forward and the realise they have a lot of work to do.
4	"Episode 4"	Alexandros Konstantaras	17 December 2025
Makori investigates Adam's past. Their parents arrive, unaware of the truth. The twins work overtime to conceal the truth.
5	"Episode 5"	Aggie Nyagari	24 December 2025
Adam/Eve insults a stranger in traffic. Eve realises the power of her feminine wiles.
6	"Episode 6"	Aggie Nyagari	31 December 2025
Eve prepares for Ms Nyota's reception. Acholi discovers Adam's photo wall and believes the worst. She investigates. What could go wrong?
7	"Episode 7"	Aggie Nyagari	7 January 2026
Adam sets out to help the women he wronged in his past, whether needed or not. Enter Mary.
8	"Episode 8"	Aggie Nyagari	14 January 2026
Adam, as Eve, faces financial problems, including rent. She seeks help from Mary on how to present herself. Things do not go as planned.
9	"Episode 9"	Alexandros Konstantaras	21 January 2026
Eve feels reconnected with Adam after a night out. However, the women in the office want to share their problems with her. Eve discovers the therapist's true colours. She tries to expose him.
10	"Episode 10"	Alexandros Konstantaras	28 January 2026
Eve focuses on taking down the therapist while blocking Manu's advances. He helps Eve to try and win her over. Eve gets what she wants, or does she?
11	"Episode 11"	Edwin Kama	4 February 2026
Eve is haunted by her harassment of the female jogger when she was Adam. She seeks to make amends and discovers the consequences of Adam's actions firsthand.
12	"Episode 12"	Edwin Kamau	11 February 2026
Eve helps Lav overcome Adam's harassment. Makori meets his online girlfriend, forcing him to introduce her to a more considerate Eve.
13	"Episode 13"	Aggie Nyagari	18 February 2026
Adam wakes up back in his body but finds Makori now in Eve's! The presence of Tasha complicates the issue. They head to Mdep for advice.
14	"Episode 14"	Aggie Nyagari	25 February 2026
Adam goes on a date with Tasha. Makori gives Adam an earpiece to coach him through the date with Tasha but warns him not to touch her.
15	"Episode 15"	Alexandros Konstantaras	4 March 2026
Makori, in Eve's body, confronts Adam, furious over his kiss with Tasha. Adam tries to explain, but Makori refuses to listen, convinced Adam initiated it. In the heat of the argument, Makori comes clean to Adam.
16	"Episode 16"	Alexandros Konstantaras	11 March 2026
Eve, now at Amanda's house, gets to know more about her and her struggles. Meanwhile, Makori and Adam clear the air and visit the witch doctor, setting them back on course with their good deeds!
17	"Episode 17"	Alexandros Konstantaras	18 March 2026
Ciku is heartbroken, so Eve steps in to get her and her boyfriend back together! Discovering Ciku's boyfriend's true intentions in the process. They team up against him!
18	"Episode 18"	Alexandros Konstantaras	25 March 2026
Adam, as Eve, sets his sights on helping Amanda, who wants to take on more responsibilities at work for a raise. He looks into her family situation.

== Production ==
=== Development ===
Adam to Eve was developed by the award-winning filmmaking couple Lizz Njagah and Alex Konstantaras through their production company, Historia Films. Alex served as the series' Head Writer and co-director. Lizz Njagah served as the Executive Producer. Co-directing duties were handled by UK-based filmmaker Aggie Nyagari.

The writing team included Serah Mwihaki, Rose Njoroge (who also stars in the series), Lily Wanjiku, Tony Koros, Yafesi Musioke, and George Salt.

Blending comedy, social commentary, and speculative fiction, Adam to Eve explores a bold gender-flip premise that challenges traditional ideas about patriarchy, identity, and power. Executive Producer Lizz Njagah noted, "At its heart, Adam to Eve is a story about walking in someone else's shoes quite literally. It uses humor to spark reflection on how we perceive gender and privilege."

Alex described the series as "unapologetically funny, deeply Kenyan, and reflective of the vibrant, evolving conversations happening across Africa about identity and equality."

== Release ==
The series was released exclusively as a Showmax Original on November 26, 2025.

== Critical reception ==
The Star's Stanlaus Manthi gave the series a positive review describing it as "a wake-up call for casual misogyny" adding that "The central message is clear and radical: Impactful change doesn’t come from being instructed to do better; it comes from living it, while simultaneously learning from it.".

== Awards and nominations ==
Year	Award	Category	Recipients	Result	Ref
2026	Kalasha International Film and TV Awards	People’s Choice – TV Drama	Lizz Njagah & Alex Konstantaras	Nominated	
2026	Africa Magic Viewers’ Choice Awards	Best Scripted M-Net Original	Lizz Njagah & Alex Konstantaras	Nominated	
2026	Zanzibar International Film Festival	Best TV Drama Series (East Africa)	Alex K & Lizz Njagah	Nominated	
2026	Zanzibar International Film Festival	Best Actor in a TV Drama (East Africa)	Blessing Lung'aho	Nominated	
2026	Zanzibar International Film Festival	Best Actress in a TV Drama (East Africa)	Ellah Maina	Nominated	
