= Blessing Lung'aho =

Kenyan actor (born 1988)

- Born: Blessing Lung'aho; 1988 (age 37–38); Uasin Gishu County, Kenya
- Citizenship: Kenyan
- Education: Catholic University of Eastern Africa
- Occupations: Actor; Model; Story teller; Content creator
- Years active: 2012–present
- Children: 2

Blessing Lung'aho (born 1988) is a Kenyan actor, content creator, TV commercial model and storyteller. He is known for playing different roles in Mo-Faya on Netflix and a local TV series, Mother-in-Law. Lung'aho has also appeared in films such as An Instant Dad, Just in Time and Ayaanle. He has featured in commercials for brands like Carlo Rossi and Zuku.

== Early life ==
Lung'aho was born in 1988 in Uasin Gishu County, Kenya in a family of four. His mother is a literature professor and his late father was an accountant. He started acting by making stage appearances at the age of 8. In 2014, he was cast for a commercial which led to his appearances in several commercials in Kenya and internationally, including Coca-Cola.

He completed his secondary school education at Kakamega High School and then joined university at the Catholic University of Eastern Africa (CUEA) for his Bachelor's degree in commerce with a major in accounting.

== Career ==
He made his debut on TV in 2012 in a drama series PREM, which aired on KTN in December 2012. He appeared on the television series Mother-in-Law. Lung'aho also appears on the series Pendo, as Raphael on Mama Digital, Sweet Taboo on StarTimes, Makavazi on KBC and Torture on Africa Magic.

In 2019, Lung'aho played Meja in a supporting role to the TV series Maria on Citizen TV. The show's last episode aired on March 18, 2021 which was replaced with Zora on March 22, 2021 with Lung'aho as one of the leading characters named Madiba. He was nominated for the Best Lead Actor in the 2021 Kalasha Awards for his role in Zora. He also played Antony in Just in Time.

In 2022, Lung'aho featured in several TV projects. He played Ken in a short film, Loop, then got a role as Agent John in Ayaanle, He also starred in the Showmax series Igiza, playing the role of Dominic. He started playing the role of Maxwell (Max) in a Netflix drama series called Country Queen and two other film roles in Village Vendetta and Mercy.

In 2023, Lung'aho appeared as Kingston in three episodes of the Netflix series Volume, Ricky in An Instant Dad and in 2024 he was in Untying Kantai as Rob.

In 2025, Lung'aho starred in TV drama Bwana Chairman on Maisha Magic Plus and Adam to Eve on Showmax.

== Personal life ==
In 2021, Lung'aho began dating his Zora co-star Jackie Matubia. The couple got engaged in April 2022, the same year they welcomed their first child together. Lung'aho also has another child from a previous relationship.

== Filmography ==
Year	Title	Role	Notes
2012	PREM		Cast, KTN drama series
	Mother-in-Law		Supporting role, Citizen TV series
2014–2016	Mama Digital	Raphael	Cast
2014–2016	Pendo		Cast, television series
2015	Monsoons Over The Moon	Policeman 2	Cast, short film
	Sweet Taboo		Cast, StarTimes television show
2018	This is Life	Martin Kamau	Cast, television series (1 episode)
2019	Relationship Goals	Adrian	Cast, short film
2019–2021	Maria	Meja	Supporting role, Citizen TV series
2019	Janjaruka (Wisen Up)	Pato	Cast, television series
2020	The Yard	Mustapha	Cast, television series (3 episodes)
2021	Just in Time	Anthony	Cast
2021–2022	Zora	Madiba	Cast, Citizen TV series
2022	Loop	Ken	Cast, short film
2022	Ayaanle	Agent John	Cast
2022	Village Vendetta		Cast
2022	Igiza	Dominic	Cast, television series (6 episodes)
2022	Arabuko		Cast
2022	Country Queen	Maxwell (Max)	Cast, television series
2022	Mercy	Father	Cast, short film
2023	Un-Adult-erated		Cast
2023	An Instant Dad	Ricky	Cast
2023	Volume	Kingston	Cast, television series (3 episodes)
2024	Untying Kantai	Rob	Cast, television series
2025	Adam to Eve	Adam/Makori/Eve	Cast, television series

== Nominations and awards ==
Year	Award	Category	Show	Result	Ref
2021	Kalasha International Film and TV Awards	Best Lead Actor in a TV Drama	Zora	Nominated	
2022	Kalasha International Film and TV Awards	Best Support Actor in a TV Drama	Country Queen	Nominated	
2024	Kalasha International Film and TV Awards	Best Lead Actor in a TV Drama	Igiza	Nominated	
