= List of radio stations in Kenya =

Kenya has a competitive radio landscape with more dozens of licensed FM stations, broadcasting primarily in English, Kiswahili and multiple vernacular languages. Radio remains one of the most widely consumed media in the country, especially outside major urban centres, due to its accessibility, low cost and strong reach into rural areas.

The state broadcaster is the Kenya Broadcasting Corporation (KBC). The largest private players include Royal Media Services, Radio Africa Group, Standard Group, Mediamax Network, and Nation Media Group. International broadcasters like the BBC World Service, Voice of America, China Radio International, and Radio France Internationale also transmit in Kenya.

The following is a list of operational radio stations licensed in Kenya. Sources:

KBC owns:

- KBC Radio Taifa
- KBC English Service
- Eastern Service
- Western Service
- Coro FM
- Pwani FM
- Nosim FM
- Minto FM
- Kitwek FM
- Mayienga FM
- Mwatu FM
- Mwago FM
- Ingo FM
- Iftiin FM
- Ngemi FM

Private/Other

- 234Radio
- BBC WS Africa
- Biblia Husema Radio
- Capital FM
- Spice FM
- Vybez FM
- Chamgee FM
- Coro FM
- CRI Nairobi 91.9 FM (China Radio International)
- Classic 105 FM
- East FM
- Easy FM
- EATN Radio
- Emoo FM
- Family Radio
- Imani Radio
- Hope FM
- Hot96
- Inooro FM
- Kameme FM
- Kass FM
- Kiss 100 FM
- Milele FM
- Musyii FM
- Mulembe FM
- Radio Italia Africa
- Radio Maisha (broadcasts in Swahili)
- Radio Waumini
- Ramogi FM
- RFI Afrique
- RHI
- Sayare Radio
- SIFA
- Sirwo Radio
- Sound Asia Radio
- Taach FM
- West FM
- Upendo FM
- Voice of America
- Kenya Radio Stations Online
- Kenya FM Radio Online

== See also ==
- Media of Kenya
- List of television stations in Kenya
- List of newspapers in Kenya
