= Royco Fuata Flava =

- Genre: Reality television
- Directed by: Vincent Mbaya
- Judges: Benjamin Nyaga; Benta Ochieng'; Kobi Kihara
- Theme music composer: David Hamill
- Country of origin: Kenya
- Original language: English
- No. of series: 2

Production
- Executive producers: Amber Prior; Kiran Kethwa
- Producers: Alex Coutts; Sarah Jethwa; Michael Chege; Evans Gathogo
- Production location: Nairobi
- Camera setup: Multi-camera
- Running time: 24-27 minutes (series 1); 40-45 minutes (series 2)
- Production company: Unilever

Original release
- Network: NTV; Citizen (former)
- Release: 5 October 2014 – 14 December 2015

Royco Fuata Flava was a Kenyan reality cooking competition show produced by Unilever. The show was hosted by renowned chef Benjamin Nyaga, Benta Ochieng and Kobi Kihara. It featured professional and aspiring cooks that auditioned in different regions of Kenya. Royco, a seasoning product widely used in Kenyan households, was the mandatory ingredient in each weekly challenge. The show was renewed for its second season in September 2015 on NTV.

== Judges ==
- Benjamin Nyaga
- Benta Ochieng
- Kobi Kihara

== Seasons ==
=== Season one ===
The first season debuted on October 5, 2014, ran for 13 episodes and it had 32 contestants short-listed out of the thousands of other Kenyans picked all over the latter country. Two eliminations were made were made per week depending on the satisfactory status of their meals prepared. From 32 down to 2 contestants, Amanda Gicharu and Tirus Thini. On the season's finale, the finalists were asked to pick ingredients prepared and covered by the judges from the Royco Flava Store in random but to their surprise, they were later instructed to exchange cooking points and thereby adding an ingredient that would give the other counterpart hell of time during his/her cooking. Amanda Gicharu was named the winner for impressing the judges. Tirus was awarded ksh 200K for being the runners-up. The season's finale was broadcast on December 7, 2015.

==== Season one contestants ====
Contestant	Age	Occupation	Hometown
Anthony Munyao	—	Freelance Chef	
Flora Consolata	41	Humanitarian Worker	
Cynthia Olwade	—	Zoology Student	
Kevin Owino Were	29	Freelance Caterer	Kisumu
Tirus Thini	—	Chef	Mombasa
Amanda Gicharu	28	Nutritionist and Marketer	Nairobi
Timothy Koli	27	Ex-Military Man	
Lilian Ombina	—	Teacher	Kisumu
Elizabeth Kuya	—	Counsellor	
Wilfred Ndungu	—	Security Consultant	
Cate Ouma	—	Public Relations Consultant	Nairobi
Esther Onyambu	—	Homemaker	Nairobi
Patrick Mwabamba	—	Food Critic	
Teresia Wanjau	—	Beautician	
Gladys Wanjau	—	Environmentalist	
Eric Otieno	—	Comedian	Mombasa
Maliha Mohammed	—	Customer care representative	Mombasa
Rahima Nassir	—	Biotechnology Student	Nairobi
Carolyne Nyakure	—	Caterer	Nairobi
Joan Kangethe	—	Administrator	
Kayum Mohammed	—	Fruit Vendor	Kisumu
Phanice Philip	—	Pharmacist	
Maureen Obango	—	Gospel Artist	Kisumu
Edith Kadoti	—	Hardware Entrepreneur	
Christian Sila	—	Graduate	
Doreen Chelagat	—	Police Officer	
Eddah Chuaga	—	Student	
Eugene Mangerere	—	Food Critic	
Anne Marie Sokhnah	—	Graduate	
Anne Nyamitta	—	Homemaker	
Rita Khan	—	Mother	

=== Season two ===
The second season incepted on October 3, 2015 with 12 contestants. Kobi Kihara joined chef Ben Nyaga as one of the judges.

==== Season two contestants ====
Contestant	Age	Occupation	Hometown
Gervais Amar	—	French Teacher and Sports Director	Mombasa
Amina Hussein	—	Businesswoman	Kisumu
Jean Ouma	—	Analytical Chemistry Student	Mombasa
Sada Nyanje	—	Booking and Ticketing Agent	Mombasa
Rose Okech	—	Microbiology Graduate	Kisumu
Tendai Mbalebwa	18	Digital Marketer	Nairobi
Anisa Nuri	—	Law Student	Mombasa
Janet Okello	—	Hospitality Lecturer	Kisumu
Kayum Mohammed	—	Fruit Salad Vendor	Kisumu
Michael Mengo	24	Freelance Marketer	Nairobi
Angela Kisoryo	25	Accountant	Nairobi
Edwin Muriithi	—	Food Production Student	Nairobi

== Finalists ==
Season	Original run	Winner	Runner-up	Reason for winning	Contestants	Winner's prize
1	October 5 – December 7, 2014	Amanda Gicharu	Tirus Thini	High standards	32	(Kenya) in Nairobi Season 1 winner Amanda was awarded ksh. 1 million.
2	September 28 – December 14, 2015	Angela Kisoryo	Jean Ouma		12	(Kenya) in Nairobi Season 2 winner Angie was awarded ksh. 1 million.

== Broadcasting ==
The first season was broadcast in Citizen TV. Episodes were 30 minutes long. It occupied the 5:30pm timeslot on Sundays and ran for 13 episodes. The second season kicked off on September 25, 2015 on NTV. It occupied the 7:30 pm timeslot with 45 minutes-long episodes with 12 contestants.
