= Pendo =

- Genre: Soap opera
- Created by: Faith Koli
- Developed by: Faith Koli
- Written by: Grace danile Lucia Shikuku
- Starring: Riziki Ambrose; Eddie Peter Gebhard: Stella Mungaia; Lawryn Odhiambo; Victoria Wakio Mzenge
- Theme music composer: Jibril Blessing (J Blessing)
- Opening theme: "Pendo"
- Composer: Jibril Blessing (J Blessing)
- Country of origin: Kenya
- Original languages: Swahili; English
- No. of seasons: Seven
- No. of episodes: 91

Production
- Executive producer: Faith Koli
- Producers: Natasha Koli; Ruth Achieng
- Production locations: Hurlingham, Nairobi
- Cinematography: John Tumbo Mbugua
- Editors: Ambrose Muindi; Michael Kuria; Kelvin Kioi
- Camera setup: Mbugua Tumbo
- Running time: 40 minutes
- Production company: DIL Pictures

Original release
- Network: NTV
- Release: 3 December 2014 – 2 November 2016

Pendo is a Kenyan drama television series that airs on NTV and premiered on 3 December 2014. The series is written by Grace Danile and produced and distributed by DIL Pictures.

== Premise ==
It is a journey with Maria in a story of her return home after 5 years of incarceration at the Women’s Maximum Prison. Her beloved husband, Juma, has taken in another wife - Maria’s former ma, – Mwelu. Mwelu as the step-mum “Mama wa Kambo” disintegrates the once close-knit family. Maria, a mother of two, also has to look for her daughter Sita, who is caught up in a survival battle. Moreover, Kongo, her angry teenage son, has been taken in by a local children’s home during Maria’s absence and is getting out of hand as a social misfit.

== Cast ==
- Eddy Peter Gebhard as Sudi
- Stella Mungai as Pearl
- Lawryn Odhiambo as Mwelu
- Victoria Wakio Mzenge as Maria
- Ambrose Riziki as Sita
- Alex Kihayo as Alfonse
- Godfrey Matengo as Kirafa
- Daniel Kevin Bwakali as Ephatus
- Hadson Mathenge as Lucas
- Innocent Njuguna as Lema
- Blessing Lung'aho
- Maina wa Ndung'u as Mariko

== Awards and nominations ==
| Year | Ceremony | Category | Nominee | Result | Ref. |
|---|---|---|---|---|---|
| 2015 | Kalasha Awards | Best Drama TV series | Pendo | Nominated | |
| 2015 | Kalasha Awards | Ambrose Riziki | Best Lead Actress in Drama | Won | |
| 2016 | Riverwood Academy Awards | Best TV series | Pendo | Nominated | |
| 2017 | Kalasha Awards | Best Local Language Film | Pendo | Won | |
