= Zora (TV series) =

Kenyan soap opera television series

- Genre: Soap opera
- Starring: Sarah Hassan; Blessing Lung'aho; Robert Agengo; Brenda Mitchell
- Country of origin: Kenya
- Original languages: Swahili; English

Production
- Producer: Lulu Hassan
- Production location: Nairobi, Kenya
- Production company: Jiffy Pictures

Original release
- Network: Citizen TV
- Release: March 22, 2021 – March 7, 2022

Zora is a Kenyan soap opera drama television series produced by Lulu Hassan's Jiffy Pictures. It premiered on 22 March 2021 until 7 March 2022, airing weekdays at 19:30 EAT on Citizen TV. It is also available on the station's on-demand streaming platform, Viusasa.

== Synopsis ==
The series focuses on Zora, the main character, and her family, which includes her husband, Fella and son, Simba. Difficulties both in their marriage and in bringing up their son are further complicated with the arrival of Madiba. Notwithstanding her mother's scolding, the support of her best friend, Nana, gives Zora the power to overcome her problems, while the storyline navigates a dramatic set of events.

== Cast ==
- Sarah Hassan as Zora
- Blessing Lung'aho as Madiba
- Robert Agengo as Fella
- Brenda Michell as Alma
- Jackie Matubia as Nana
- Neema Sulubu as Neema
- Quincy Rapando as Kwame
- Eunice David as Hamida
- Patrick Gatimu as Oscar
- Joseph Gachanja as Mzee Chibale
- Bridget Shighadi as Yola

== Reception ==
Zora received praise for its production, but was described as "for more mature audiences" compared to its predecessor Maria. The Media Council of Kenya had asked the show's producers for more consideration in their screenwriting, especially when dealing with sensitive or traumatic subject matters, such as infertility and sexual abuse.
