= Catherine Kasavuli =

Kenyan journalist (1962–2022)

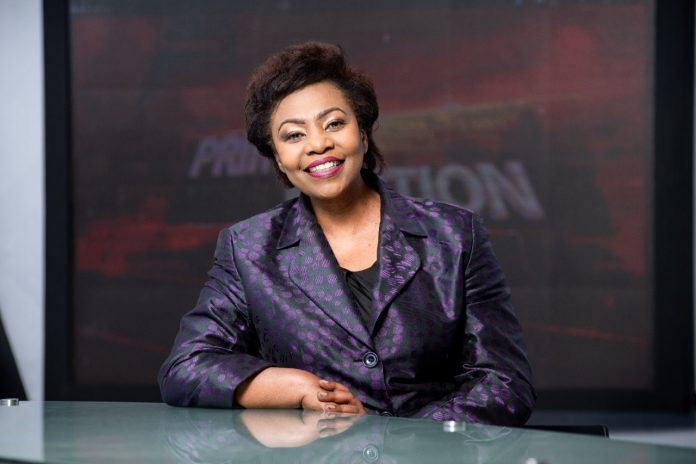
- Born: Catherine Kiza Kasavuli; February 22, 1962; Nairobi, Kenya
- Died: December 29, 2022 (aged 60); Nairobi, Kenya
- Citizenship: Kenyan
- Education: Kenya Institute of Mass Communication
- Occupations: Journalist, news anchor, television presenter
- Years active: 1980–2022
- Employer(s): Kenya Broadcasting Corporation; Kenya Television Network; Citizen TV
- Known for: First female television news anchor in Kenya
- Children: 1
- Awards: Order of the Grand Warrior of Kenya (2008)

Catherine Kiza Kasavuli (22 February 1962 – 29 December 2022) was a Kenyan journalist and news presenter. Kasavuli was the first female news anchor in Kenya and had previously worked in other television stations including the Kenyan Broadcasting Corporation (KBC), Citizen Television, and Kenya Television Network (KTN).

== Career ==
Kasavuli started her career as a radio continuity announcer in 1980 at the Voice of Kenya, which was renamed to KBC in later years. Her uncle, who had listened to her reading the Bible and praying for dinner, advised her to apply for the job, at the age of 18. Kasavuli would later transition to television at the company in 1985. Kasavuli had no prior professional training and two years into her job, she went to the Kenya Institute of Mass Communication. In March 1990, Catherine became part of the founding team of KTN as the first privately owned television station in the country. She became the station's first anchor to go on live broadcast, a shift from the previous pre-recorded format. Other than being a TV presenter, Kasavuli would voice commercials to supplement her earnings.

After being at KTN for 17 years, Kasavuli left the station in 2007 to join Citizen TV, owned by Royal Media Services. She left alongside other high-profile news anchors such as Swaleh Mdoe and Louis Otieno. She later held the position of corporate affairs manager at Royal Media Services, the parent company of Citizen TV. In 2015, Kasavuli retired from the limelight to work behind the screens.

However, towards the end of July 2021, eight years after leaving television, Kasavuli made a comeback and signed a deal with the Kenya Broadcasting Corporation (KBC) where she anchored weekend news. In an interview after her comeback, she stated, “I wanted to come to KBC to train anchors to hone their skills but never expected an offer of this magnitude.” Despite her famous public personality and unlike her successors in the Kenyan media space, the soft spoken and ever-smiling anchor preferred to keep her personal life private.

== Personal life ==
Kasavuli had one son, Martin, who was born in 1981. Catherine had reportedly stated that she had to leave him home to attend to her career and regretted missing the early moments of his childhood. After retiring from television, she founded Kasavuli Media Group Limited which owns several subsidiaries including a training school for broadcasters. She died on 29 December 2022 at the age of 60 from cervical cancer at Kenyatta National Hospital (KNH) in Nairobi Kenya, where she had been admitted and was undergoing treatment since October 2022.

== Awards ==
In 2008, Kasavuli received the Order of the Grand Warrior of Kenya during Jamhuri Day Celebrations.
