= Maria (TV series) =

Kenyan television series

- Genre: TV drama series
- Created by: Lulu Hassan
- Written by: Ahmed Musa; Ibrahim Chitayi; Alex Ndavi; Abubakar Mwenda
- Directed by: Julian S. Mwanzele
- Starring: Yasmin Said; Bridget Shighadi; Brian Ogana
- Theme music composer: Ibrahim Chitayi
- Opening theme: Binti Kichaa
- Country of origin: Kenya
- Original languages: English; Swahili; Sheng'
- No. of episodes: 374

Production
- Camera setup: Multi-camera
- Running time: 25 minutes
- Production companies: Citizen TV; Jiffy Pictures

Original release
- Network: Viusasa
- Release: 10 October 2019 – 18 March 2021

Related
- Zora

Maria is a Kenyan prime-time romantic television drama directed by Julian S. Mwanzele. It stars Yasmin Said depicting the eponymous character, alongside Brian Ogana and Bridget Shighadi, in their first television series. It premiered on 10 October 2019, and the last episode aired on 18 March 2021 after 374 episodes. The series aired weekdays on Citizen TV in its 7:30 PM time slot EAT (UTC +03:00) and on Viusasa.

The romantic drama camps around three characters Maria, a prepossessing adopted ghetto girl; Luwi, the firstborn son of the wealthy Hausa family and Sofia, his wife whose motive is acquiring her connubial family fortune.

== Plot ==
The fictional story follows the life of Maria Yasmin Said. Having never met her parents, she is raised by her foster mother, Naomi, who dies soon after. Maria is then adopted by William Hausa, a wealthy man from the city's affluent suburbs, where she meets Luwi, the family's eldest son. Despite being legally betrothed to Sofia, Luwi falls deeply in love with Maria. She eventually learns of his feelings and reciprocates. After divorcing Sofia, Luwi proposes to Maria.

However, their blissful romance turns sour when Maria discovers that William, Luwi's father, played a role in her own father's death and the acquisition of his fortune. Matters worsen when it is revealed that Victor is not William's biological son. Victor banishes the entire family from their home, indulges in reckless behavior, and eventually loses his sanity. It is later uncovered that Victor is both Sofia's paternal and Luwi's maternal half-brother, adding a dramatic twist to the story.

William survives a near fatal accident but soon becomes entangled in a conspiratorial scheme with his house manager, Meja, which leads to Sandra's imprisonment. Feeling betrayed, Sandra who has always been secretly in love with William vows revenge. Although Maria once considered suing William for his past crimes, she eventually shows compassion and forgives him. Luwi proposes to her a second time, and she accepts, setting the stage for their wedding.

On the wedding day, tragedy strikes when Brenda, intending to shoot Maria, accidentally kills Sofia instead. Meanwhile, Silas proposes to Vanessa, leaving Maggie heartbroken as she has long been in love with him. William, on the other hand, is arrested, convicted, and sentenced for his crimes.

Months later, Maria and Luwi, now newlyweds, are expecting their first child. As they tour the Maasai Mara, they celebrate their love and look forward to a bright and promising future together.

=== Love interests in Maria ===
- Luwi and Maria
- Silas and Vanessa
- Victor and Sonia
- Victor and Delilah

== Cast and characters ==
=== Main cast ===
- Yasmin Said as Maria Tino
- Bridget Shighadi as Sofia
- Brian Martins Ogana as Luwi Hausa
- Ronald Ndubi as Victor
- Dennis Musyoka as Boss William Hausa
- Sheila Ndanu as Madam Victoria Hausa (aka Vickie)
- Wanjiku Stephens as Vanessa Hausa

=== Supporting cast ===
- Linda Alexette as Tobi
- Teddy Brown as Fali
- Belinda Joana as Kobi
- Aisha Hussein as Gloria
- Umar Hussein as Pupa
- Abdalla Ali as Jayden
- Botul Abdalla as Marianne
- Beatrice Dorea as Maggie
- Blessing Lung'aho as Meja
- Carol Kipsuto as Sandra
- Periz Wambui as Salome
- Terry Ombaka as Naomi
- Robert Budi as Trevor
- Grace Obuya as Sister Teresa
- Tina Njambi as Lorna
- Christopher Kamau as Daniel
- Maureen Wangare as Brenda
- Edna Nguka as Delilah
- Musa Ore as Father Ezekiel
- Nyakundi Isaboke as Silas
- Timothy Musyoka as Ben
- Tindo Mwanzele as Mwambe
- Suzie Malaki as Rufina
- Quincy Ando as Thomas
- Edwin Buni as Koros
- Sarah Malaki as Mama Chapo
- Alice Mari as Kanini
- Jane Mulanda as Dogo
- Joseph Kiplabatt as Collo
- Anthony Ashioya as Tekno
- Brian Kibochi as Bondi

=== Cameo ===
- Aseem Sharma as Sonia

== Reception ==
Pilot episode		Finale episode		Average
Air date	Rating	Air date	Rating	Average
10 October 2019	31.8%	18 March 2021	36.8%	29%

== Reruns ==
The reruns of weekday episodes of the show aired every Saturday at 4 PM EAT (UTC +03:00) until 20 March 2021.

== See also ==
- Kalasha Awards Winners since 2009

== Awards and nominations ==
Year	Award	Category	Nominee(s)	Result	Ref.
2020	Kalasha Film & TV Awards	Best Lead Actress in TV Drama	Yasmin Said	Won	
2020	Kalasha Film & TV Awards	Best TV Drama	Maria (TV series)	Won	
2020	Kalasha Film & TV Awards	Best Lead Actor in TV Drama	Brian Ogana	Nominated	
