= Julie Gichuru =

Kenyan journalist

Julie Gìchūrū
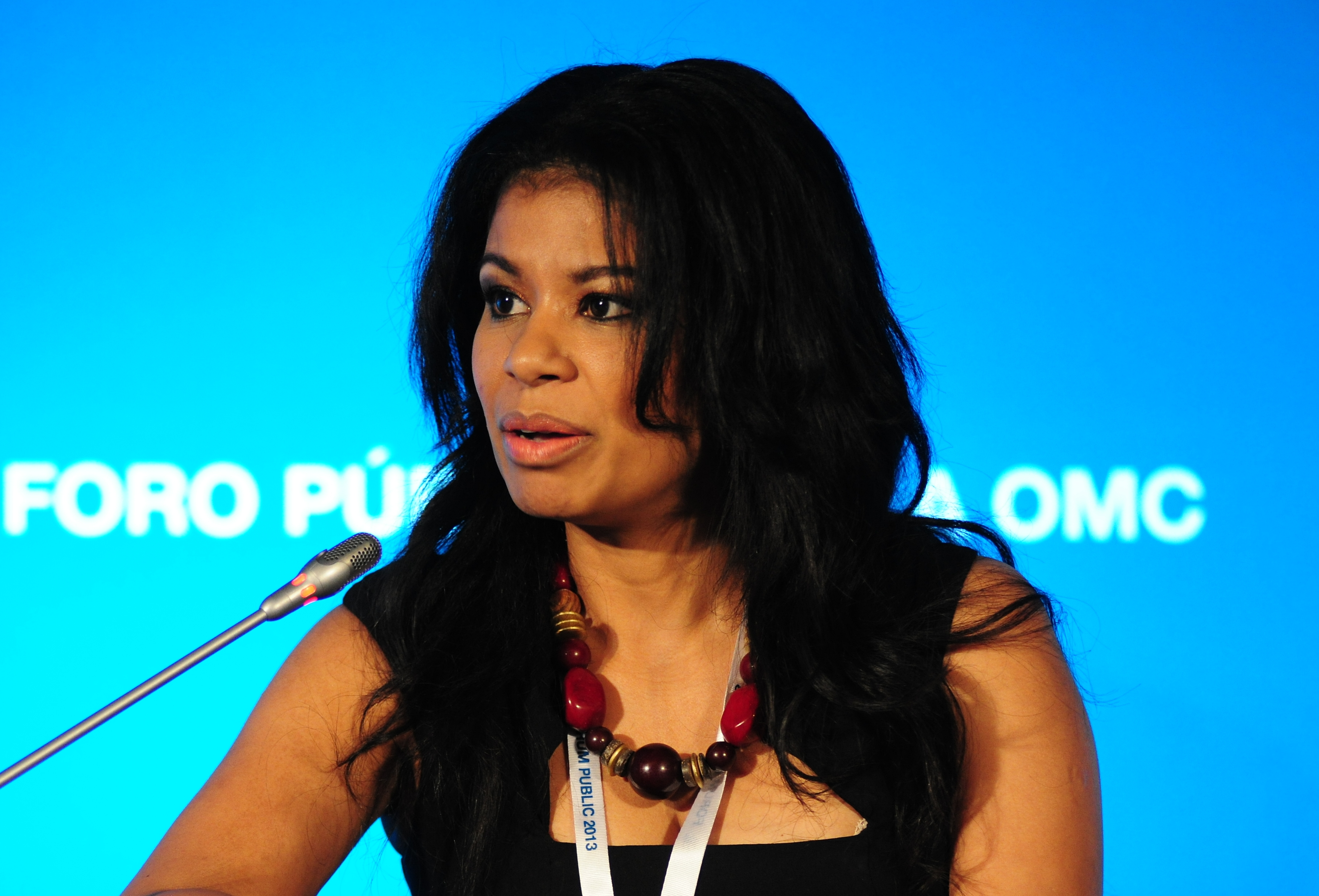
- Born: Julie Gathoni Sumira; 7 January 1974 (age 52); Nairobi, Kenya
- Citizenship: Kenya
- Education: LLB Law; MBA Business Administration; Cardiff School of Law and Politics; Cardiff Business School
- Occupation: Journalist; Entrepreneur; Media Personality
- Spouse: Anthony Gìchūrū
- Children: 4
- Awards: Martin Luther King Salute to Greatness Order of the Golden Warrior (O.G.W) of Kenya Top 20 Young Power Women in Africa

Julie Gathoni Sumira Gìchūrū (born 7 January 1974, Nairobi) is a Kenyan businesswoman, entrepreneur and media personality with investments in media, fashion retail and entertainment sectors. She is an independent director at Acumen Communication Limited and is a fellow and trustee of the Africa Leadership Initiative EA.

== Education background ==
Gìchūrū attended St Christophers School in Nairobi at the age of eight and later Green Herald in Bangladesh. She came back to Kenya and joined Karen C school before transferring to Loreto Convent Msongari. In form two, she transferred from 8-4-4 system to a GCE boarding school and joined Imani School in Thika for Form 3 and 4. After attaining her Kenya Certificate for Secondary Education, she joined USIU for two semesters before transferring to the UK for a one-year pre-university course at the University of Warwick, then joining University of Wales for her law degree. After completing her law degree, she worked for a year before proceeding with a master's in Business Administration at the same university. She holds an LLB Law and an MBA in Business Administration from Cardiff Law School, University of Wales and Cardiff Business School, University of Wales respectively.

== Career ==
Julie Gìchūrū initially worked at Capital FM before moving to television as a reporter and news anchor at Kenya Television Network. She appeared in the Kenyan investigative TV series, The Inside Story, on Kenya Television Network as well as current affairs shows at NTV (Kenya) including political and current affairs programs Showdown, On the Spot, You The Jury and The People's Voice, and the news program Sunday Live and peace and reconciliation program Fist to Five at Citizen TV. Also included in this list is the post-election peace special Voices of Reason. Through ARIMUS Media Limited Gìchūrū now oversees the production of African content such as Africa Leadership Dialogues, the High School debate platform Great Debaters Contest, entertainment series Maisha and a pipeline TV production of the Fatuma's Voice social Forum. The Footprints Africa Foundation (FAF) was established by Anthony and Julie Gìchūrū.

She is the founder, president and CEO of the Africa Leadership and Dialogue Institute (ALADI). From 2019, she was the public affairs and communications officer for the Mastercard Foundation. Through her social media profiles, she announced leaving the foundation on October 2, 2024.

== Awards ==
She is a recipient of the Martin Luther King Salute to Greatness Award. Avance Media listed her as one of the 100 Most Influential African Women of 2019, and New African listed her as one of the 100 Most Influential Africans of 2017 and 2019. Besides she was recognized as the Young Global Leader by the World Economic Forum in 2010.

== Personal life ==
Gìchūrū is married to entrepreneur Anthony Gìchūrū. They have had four children.
