= Teardrops (poet) =

Poet Teardrops
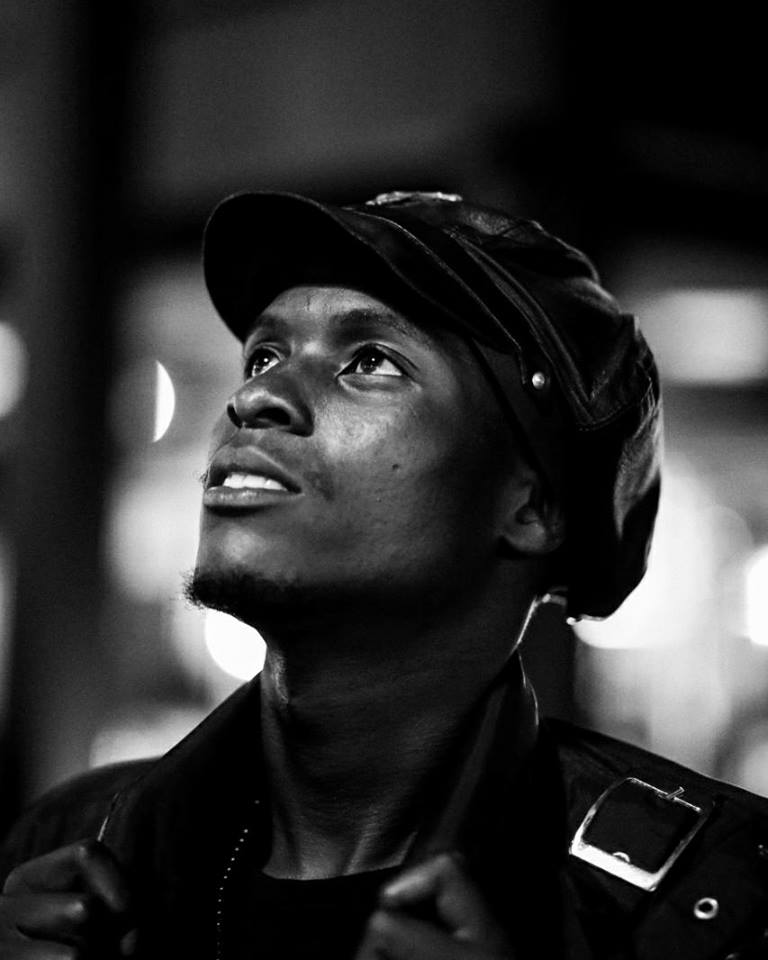
- I am Teardrops, The POET

Background information
- Also known as: Poet Teardrops
- Born: Mark Joshua Ouma; 2 October 1990 (age 35); Nairobi, Kenya
- Genres: Spoken Word; Poetry
- Occupations: Spoken Word; Poet
- Years active: 2002–present
- Label: Churchill Show
- Website: www.teardrops.co.ke

Mark Joshua Ouma, better known as Teardrops, is a Kenyan spoken word artist based in Nairobi.

== Biography ==
Mark Joshua Ouma was born in the Makongeni, Nairobi, Kenya, and grew up in Kisulisuli in Nakuru. Teardrops has been an active spoken word artist since 2009.

== Career ==
Teardrops began poetry professionally in 2009, and has so far released two albums. His first album was co-launched at a sold-out event on 12 October 2014 at the Alliance Franchise, Unchained Voices, with Mufasa, another Kenyan spoken word poet. His second album, Teardrops:Shengspear (Memoirs of a wordsmith), was released on 29 April 2017 at the same venue to also a sold-out event.

In 2014, he won the Pillars of Africa award in the Male arts & culture category for his spoken word.

== Awards and nominations ==
- (2014) Pillars of Africa – Male Arts & Culture Category Award [Won]
- (2014) Honesty Oscars awards – Best Activism Award for the song "Nitabaki na nini" [Nominated]
- (2013) Kwani Open Mic Slam Competition.[Won]
- (2009) Slam Africa [Won]

== Features ==
Teardrops has had numerous extensive features in both local and international dailies.

He has been featured in the leading dailies in Kenya most notably Daily Nation, and Zuqka pull out and People's Daily.

He has also been featured on The Trend, NTV (three times), and on all major TV stations entertainment segments in Kenya. Notably, he was featured on AM Live NTV, whereby he was crowned the champion of a poetry competition on the show. He has also been featured on Kenya Television Network as a guest News Anchor.

Teardrops has also been featured on almost all major radio stations in Kenya.

== Works ==
Teardrops has headlined numerous poetry and arts events over the course of his career. Most notably is the African Union conference, The Garissa Memorial Concert at Uhuru Park in 2015 (an event to commemorate the 147 lives that were lost at the Garissa technical university) alongside artists such as Eric Wainaina, Sarabi, Hart the band, among others. Teardrops has also headlined the climate change festival organized by the German and French embassy.

In 2016, he was handpicked by the Churchill Show to perform his poetry for 22 episodes, and the contract was also extended in 2017–2018 season and he airs each Sunday on NTV.

He has also performed at the OXFAM report launch on poverty levels on 6 December 2017, at the Sarova Stanley.
