= Churchill Show =

Kenyan comedy show

- Also known as: Churchill Live
- Genre: Comedy; Reality; Entertainment
- Directed by: J Blessing
- Presented by: Daniel "Churchill" Ndambuki
- Starring: Poet Teardrops; Wanjiku the Teacher; Eddie Butita; Eric Klondike; Alex Mungahi; MC Jessy; Chipukeezy; Fred Klondike
- Country of origin: Kenya
- Original languages: English; Swahili; Sheng
- No. of seasons: 6

Production
- Executive producer: Daniel Ndambuki
- Producer: Laugh Industry ltd
- Production location: Carnivore Grounds, Nairobi
- Cinematography: Laugh industry ltd
- Running time: 45-50 minutes
- Production company: Laugh Industry Company

Original release
- Network: NTV
- Release: 2007

Related
- Churchill Raw; Auntie Boss!

Churchill Show (formerly Churchill Live) is a Kenyan comedy show hosted by comedian Daniel "Churchill" Ndambuki, that premiered on 2007 on the network NTV. It is recorded live at Carnivore grounds in Nairobi.

== Churchill Raw ==
A 30-minute show and subsidiary of Churchill Show, it is hosted by comedian MC Jesse. The series often airs content that may not air on Churchill Show.

== Comedians ==
- Eric Omondi (comedian)
- Felix Omondi
- MC Jessie
- Baite Murume
- Chipukeezy
- Fred Omondi
- Karis (comedian)'
- YY (Oliver Otieno)
- Janyando Mig Mig
- Owago Onyiro
- Poet Teardrops
- Teacher Wanjiku
- Eddie Butita
- Alex Mungahi
- Mammito Eunice
- Steven Oduor
- Professor Hammoh
- Shix Kapienga
- Jacky Vike

== Kenya broadcast ==
Churchill Show (then: Churchill Live) premiered on NTV (Kenya) in 2007 and continued until late 2009. The series returned for a second season on January 17, 2013. It originally aired Thursdays at 8 p.m. EAT, but was later moved to Sundays at 8 p.m. As of November 2014, in its fifth season, it was the network's most viewed show and one of the most watched in East Africa. It is also broadcast in East Africa in StarTimes syndicate channel StarTimes Swahili.
