= Ngasuma Kanyeka =

Tanzanian entrepeneur

- Born: Ngasuma Eva Kanyeka

Academic background
- Education: London Metropolitan University; University of Bergen (MPh); Harvard Kennedy School (MPA)

Ngasuma Eva Kanyeka is a Tanzanian entrepreneur who is currently a doctoral student at Harvard T.H. Chan School of Public Health. She was awarded the Tessa Jowell Fellowship for Doctoral Research in 2026.

== Biography ==
Kanyeka founded Capacite Consulting in 2011, a communications and strategy firm that worked with UN agencies, the African Union, and the Open Society Foundation. She headed the company for eight years. She managed the USAID-funded project Feed the Future Tanzania Advancing Youth from 2017 to 2022.

Kanyeka completed her Bachelor of Science in computing and information systems at the London Metropolitan University and her Master of Philosophy at the University of Bergen. By 2021, she became a Masters of Public Administration graduate from Harvard Kennedy School's Belfer Center for Science and International Affairs. She is a Doctor of Public Health student at the Harvard T.H. Chan School of Public Health. Her doctoral research focuses on financial inequalities facing youth- and women-led small- and medium-sized Tanzanian businesses. Her research is to be done in collaboration with the Ministries of Youth, Finance, and Planning in Tanzania.

=== Awards ===
She was recognised alongside 40 others as a youth leader in family planning by the International Planned Parenthood Federation in 2015. Kenyan newspaper The EastAfrican listed her among the top 13 out of 100 women advancing gender equality in East Africa in 2018. CV People Africa named her among the top 50 women in management in 2019. She was awarded the Tessa Jowell Fellowship for Doctoral Research by the Harvard Ministerial Leadership Program on 22 April 2026. She was congratulated by former Tanzanian president Jakaya Kikwete.
