= Patrick Quarcoo =

Ghanaian Kenya-based entrepreneur

- Born: Patrick Quarcoo; May 23, 1957 (age 69); Cape Coast, Ghana
- Other name: PQ
- Education: BSc Administration, University of Ghana (1977–1980).; MBA, Manchester Business School (1984–1986).; Senior Executive Program, Harvard University (2017).
- Occupation: Entrepreneur · Media Executive
- Years active: 2000–present
- Known for: Founder & CEO of Radio Africa Group
- Spouse: Late Gifty Quarcoo (married until her death in 2020)
- Children: 3

Notes
- The information in this infobox was sourced from Tuko News

Patrick Quarcoo (born 23 May 1957), commonly known as PQ, is a Ghanaian-born, Kenya-based entrepreneur and media executive. He co-founded and was CEO of the Radio Africa Group, an East African media conglomerate operating radio, television, print, and digital platforms in Kenya and Uganda. Quarcoo received the International Recognition Award at the 2012 Ghana UK-Based Achievement Awards.

== Early life and education ==
Quarcoo was born in Cape Coast, Ghana, into a family that valued education and print media—his grandmother told him, “Book no lies,” inspiring his lifelong passion for journalism. He earned a Bachelor of Science in Administration from the University of Ghana (1977–1980). He completed an MBA at Alliance Manchester Business School (1984–1986), specializing in International Marketing and Corporate Strategy. In 2017, he attended Harvard University’s Senior Executive Program.

== Career ==
=== Early journalism career ===
After university, Quarcoo joined Reuters in Uganda, where he worked as a reporter throughout the 1990s. In 2000, he relocated to Nairobi to launch his own media venture with British journalist William Pike.

=== Radio Africa Group ===
In 2000, Quarcoo and William Pike co-founded the Radio Africa Group, headquartered in Westlands, Nairobi. Their flagship station, Kiss 100 FM, quickly became the top youth-oriented radio channel in Nairobi. Over the next decade, the group launched a series of other stations and a newspaper, The Star (Kenya). In 2014, the group entered television with Bamba TV, its free-to-air digital channel. Radio Africa also expanded regionally, co-owning Capital FM and Beat FM in Uganda.

=== Retirement and legacy ===
After 24 years at the helm, Quarcoo stepped down as CEO in June 2024 to pursue personal interests, remaining on the board as a major shareholder. Under his leadership, Radio Africa Group launched six radio stations, one newspaper, a television channel, and multiple digital platforms, solidifying its role as an East African media powerhouse.

== Personal life ==
Quarcoo was married to Gifty Quarcoo, who died from cancer in April 2020; the couple had three children.

== Awards and nominations ==
Year	Award ceremony	Award	Category	Result
2012	GUBA Awards	International Recognition Award	International Recognition	Winner
2024	AllAfrica Media Leaders’ Summit	Lifetime Achievement Award	Lifetime Achievement	Winner
2024	Marketing Society of Kenya Awards	MSK Warrior Award	Outstanding Achievement in Marketing	Winner

== See also ==
- Media of Kenya
- List of radio stations in Kenya
