= Mammito Eunice =

Kenyan comedian, actress and MC

- Born: Eunice Wanjiru Njoki; 18 September 1993 (age 33); Nairobi, Kenya

Comedy career
- Years active: 2015–present
- Medium: Stand-up; television
- Genres: Observational comedy; surreal humor
- Subject: Everyday life
- Website: https://mammito.co.ke

Eunice Wanjiru Njoki (born 18 September 1993), known as Mammito, is a Kenyan stand-up comedian, actress, writer and an mcee. She grew up in the slums of Kibera.

== Early life and education ==
Mammito was born in Nairobi on September 18, 1993. She has never met her father, and does not know how it feels to have a father figure. Her mother, Nancy Njoki, a seamstress raised her single-handedly. She grew up in the slums of Kibera. She attended Laini Saba for primary education. Getting a meal alone, in these slums was quite a struggle. Because life in the slums was challenging, her mother was a strict disciplinarian and did not allow her to play with the neighbours' children.

Mammito joined Laini Saba Primary School in 2001 in Standard one. She sat for her KCPE in 2007. She then joined Gatero Girls High School, Nyahururu in 2008 where she studied up to Form Three. In 2011 she changed school to Silanga Mixed Secondary School, Kibera where she sat her KCSE in 2011. She studied Community Development at Mount Kenya University.

At that time, she was involved in a lot of comedy, poetry and dance, which her aunt and mother disapproved of, saying it made her a joker. With that, together with peer pressure setting in, she became rebellious and was sent to the village in Murang'a to stay with her grandmother. In Murang'a, she used to help her grandmother to sell school uniforms and other forms of clothes.

In 2015, she enrolled at Mount Kenya University, where she pursued a Diploma in Community Development. At the university, she joined the drama group. During one of the talent shows, " I registered as a singer but when I stepped on the stage, I instead did stand-up comedy. The judges were so impressed that they gave me a standing ovation. It was at that moment that I knew what I wanted to be – a stand-up comedian." She completed her course in 2016.

She got the name Mammito, from a clique of friends who used to call each other Mammito.

== Career ==
=== 2015 - present ===
After university, Mammito started looking for a job as a social worker, but she failed to get one. She had never considered comedy as a career. But after missing out on job opportunities, she auditioned for the Churchill Show.. She failed to impress a couple of times and would be sent away, only to be recalled because she lacked courage and stage presence despite her jokes being funny. This continued until she was finally admitted. in 2015.

In 2015 during her first open mic performance at the Churchill Show, she had so much stage fright. that nobody laughed. "it's like I was giving a speech, there was nothing but echo. There is even a time I forgot all my lines, I just looked blankly at the crowd and walked off stage, I was so embarrassed I just cried."

In 2017, Mammito was scheduled to perform at the three day Kigali International Comedy Festival event in November.

In 2018 Mammito appeared in Anthony Bourdain: Parts Unknown television documentary as herself. In June 2018, she performed at the Seka Festival Season 4 in Kigali. Rwanda. In June 2018, she performed at the East Africa Comedy Show at the Kenyatta International Convention Centre (KICC). In December 2018, she returned to Rwanda to perform in the Evening of Laugh Comedy Show

On 5 January 2019, Mammito headlined the Saturday Night Comedy at the Blues Restaurant in Nairobi. Mammito performed at the 2019 Laugh Festival at the KICC. On 2 August, she performed at the Queens of Comedy in Botswana.

== Personal life ==
Mammito has two siblings. In 2018, she took a photo with fellow comedian Edwin Butita which led to speculations that she was pregnant with his baby. She said she took that picture after having had lunch, to explain the bulge. She has no children.

She is a Christian.

== Filmography ==
=== Television ===
Year	Show	Role	Notes	Network
2017–present	Churchill Show	Herself		NTV Kenya
2018	Anthony Bourdain: Parts Unknown	Herself	Season 12: Episode 1	
