= Kathleen Openda-Mvati =

Kenyan journalist and television host

- Born: Kathleen Openda-Mvati
- Education: Cardiff University, Wales

Kathleen Openda-Mvati is a Kenyan journalist and former television host with the Kenya Television Network (KTN).

She received an Eisenhower Fellowship and was a Chevening Scholar. In 2018, she was appointed Chairperson of the Council of the Kenya Institute of Mass Communication (KIMC).
