= Akili Kids! =

Akili TV
- Country: Kenya
- Broadcast area: Kenya
- Headquarters: Nairobi

Programming
- Languages: Swahili and English
- Picture format: 576i SDTV

Ownership
- Owner: Akili Network Ltd.

History
- Launched: 31 March 2020; 6 years ago

Links
- Webcast: https://akili.tv/watch/
- Website: akilikids.co.ke

Availability

Terrestrial
- DStv: Channel 311
- GOtv: Channel 91
- Zuku TV: Channel 602
- StarTimes: Channel 105

Akili TV (formerly Akili Kids!) is a Kenyan free-to-air children's television network owned by Akili Network. The channel is available for free on the basic subscriptions of every television operator in Kenya and broadcasts a variety of pre-school educational series aimed at children, the bulk of it coming from foreign sources, mainly British and American. The network is built on the model of PBS Kids, adjusted for the Kenyan reality.

== History ==
At the time of launching, Kenya had a strong underage population of 20 million, yet local television was lacking in children's content. Only eight of the 137 channels broadcasting from within Kenya carry five hours of children's programming per week. This justified the creation of the Akili Kids! channel on 31 March 2020, led by Jesse Soleil, CEO of Akili Network.

Akili Kids launched in May 2020 with 500 half-hours of acquired content from the catalogues of Wildbrain, 9Story Entertainment, Sesame Workshop, Nickelodeon (Nick Jr.) and others. The content seen on the channel has to be educational in nature out of concerns that cartoons are touted as "frivolous" by Kenyan parents. In addition to foreign content, African content such as the Tanzanian series Akili and Me is aired. The goal set in 2020 was to reach the 40% target for local content by 2023.

In June 2020, the channel made it to GOtv's service, where it increased its viewership base. By September, it had reached 36% of Kenyan children.

In December 2021, Akili Kids started airing Akili Fam!, a primetime block aimed at family audiences, on Fridays and Saturdays. The strand started airing Flash Squad in 2022, teaching concepts such as internet safety to teenage audiences. In October 2022, an agreement was signed with Prudential to bring its Cha-Ching property to Kenya, in order to bring financial education to children.

For the playout, it employs the Playbox Neo Cloud2TV system, installed in both Nairobi and New York. The system had played more than one million video files as of June 2024, four years after launching. New York only gets larger content files, command and control and quality control.

In December 2022, the channel's parent company received an investment from the Rwanda Innovation Fund As of year-end 2022, Akili Kids! was the most-watched channel among households with children, ahead of leading commercial network Citizen TV.

On 18 November 2024, Akili Kids was renamed Akili TV. New series as well as syndicated programmes from the African service of Voice of America were added.
