= Kenya Union of Journalists =

KUJ
- Kenya Union of Journalists
- Founded: 1962
- Headquarters: Nairobi, Kenya
- Location: Kenya
- Key people: John Atambo; Erick Oduor; Toepista Nabusoba
- Affiliations: COTU; IFJ
- Website: https://kuj.or.ke/

The Kenya Union of Journalists is a Kenyan trade union that respresents media practitioners, working in the news industry, in the Republic of Kenya. This includes: Reporters, writers, editors, photographers, graphic artists, designers, production personnel, administrative, marketing, sales staff, nstructors and professors teaching journalism. It was founded in 1962 as the Kenya Colony branch of the National Union of Journalists.

== Abduction of a journalist ==
After the 14 September 2025 abduction, torture, forced inhalation of cannabis, and theft of electronic devices of a People Daily journalist, the KUJ along with the International Federation of Journalists condemned the act.
