= Signet (Kenya) =

Digital terrestrial television signal distributor

Signet is a Kenyan subsidiary of the Kenya Broadcasting Corporation that broadcast and distribute the DTT signals on DVB-T2. It was first launched on 9 December 2009 by H.E. President Mwai Kibaki in Nairobi and its environs. KBC decided to sell it in 2015.

== Channels ==
The channels included are:

- Signet- KUTV
- Signet- KBC 1
- Signet- KTN
- Signet- KUTV Kenya
- Signet- NTV
- Signet- K24 TV-(News television)
- Signet- Citizen TV
- Signet – Word Music TV (24 hour music)
- Signet- GBS TV
- Signet- QTV
- Signet- Elly TV (KIE TV)
- Signet- Bunge TV(parliamentary proceedings)
- Signet- Heritage TV
- Signet- 3 stones TV (A Kikuyu TV)
- Signet- JBN TV (Christian Television)
- Signet- Family TV (Gospel television)
- Signet- MBCI TV (Christian Television)
- Signet- Sayare TV (gospel television)
- Signet- LVTV (lake Victoria TV)
- Signet- Gor TV
- Signet- Senate TV(parliamentary proceedings)
- Signet- Kass TV( Kalenjin TV)
- Signet- Kiss TV
- Signet- Express TV
- Signet- Aviation TV (gospel)
- Signet- Hope TV (gospel C.I.T.A.M)
- Signet- Revival Television (Gospel)
- Signet- Fountain Television
- Signet- Bazaar Television (about cars-sales and adverts)
- Signet- Dream Television
- Signet- Property Television(sell of houses real estate)
- Signet- TV10(music)
- Signet- Youth Television
- Signet- Manifest Television
- Signet- Millennium/MBN(gospel)
- Signet- EATV
- Signet- UTV
- Signet- Kingdom(gospel)
- Signet- Adventist(gospel)
- Signet- Deliverance(gospel)
- Signet- GE TV(gospel)
- Signet- Joy Television(gospel)
- Signet- Y254
- Signet- Baite tv
- Signet- Nyota tv
- Signet- Jambu TV
- Signet- Starhertz tv
