= .ke =

Internet country-code top level domain for Kenya

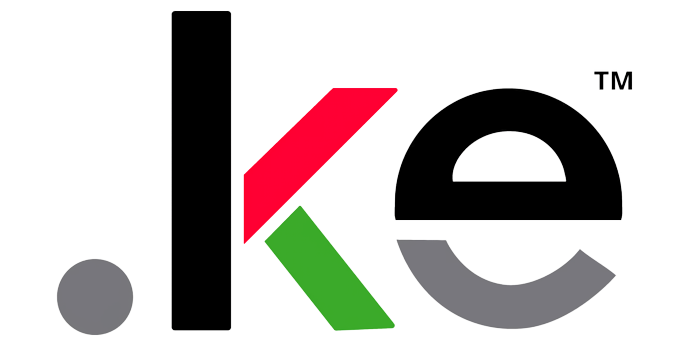
- Introduced: 29 April 1993; 32 years ago
- TLD type: Country code top-level domain
- Status: Active
- Registry: KeNIC
- Sponsor: KeNIC
- Intended use: Entities connected with Kenya
- Actual use: Very popular in Kenya; gets some other uses, also used for domain hacks, e.g. ca.ke
- Registered domains: 102,775 (2022-12-17)
- Registration restrictions: Registration under some second-level labels requires supporting documents
- Structure: Registrations are at third level beneath second level subdomain labels
- Documents: Policies
- Dispute policies: Disputes
- DNSSEC: Yes
- Registry website: KeNIC

.ke is the Internet country code top-level domain (ccTLD) for Kenya.

KENIC, short for Kenya Network Information Centre, is the authoritative agency responsible for managing the registrations and issuance of the .ke domain.

In 2002, KENIC assumed control of the .ke domain when it had a meager number of less than 1,000 registrations.

Prior to KENIC's involvement, the administration of the domain was overseen by two individuals: Shem Ochuodho from Kenya and Randy Bush from America, both esteemed tech experts.

== Second-level domains ==
Second-level domains, under which domains are registered at the third level, are:

- .co.ke: This is the most common .ke domain extension and is available for registration by anyone, both individuals and businesses, without specific restrictions. However, presence in Kenya is required.
- .or.ke: Intended for not-for-profit organizations operating in Kenya. To register a .or.ke domain, the organization must provide documentation proving its not-for-profit status.
- .ne.ke: for network devices
- .go.ke: for Government entities. Requires supporting documents
- .ac.ke: Reserved for academic institutions such as universities, colleges, and schools in Kenya. Proof of educational institution status is typically required.
- .sc.ke: for lower and middle institutes of learning. Requires supporting documents
- .me.ke: for personal names/websites
- .mobi.ke: for mobile content
- .info.ke: for informational content

== KeNIC's Dispute Resolution ==
KeNIC (Kenya Network Information Centre) has established a dispute resolution process for handling domain name disputes related to .ke domains. This process is designed to resolve conflicts or disputes that may arise between parties over the registration and use of .ke domain names.

1. "Dispute Categories: KeNIC's dispute resolution process covers various categories of disputes, including but not limited to:
  - Cybersquatting: This involves the bad-faith registration of a domain name with the intent to profit from the goodwill associated with someone else's trademark.
  - Domain Name Similarity: Disputes over domain names that are similar to existing trademarks or other domain names.
  - Abusive Registrations: Disputes related to the abusive or unlawful use of a domain name.
2. Complaint Filing: To initiate a dispute resolution process, the complainant (the party bringing the dispute) must file a complaint with KeNIC. The complaint should include detailed information about the dispute, evidence of rights to the domain name or trademark, and a description of how the domain name is being used in bad faith.
3. Response: The respondent (the party against whom the complaint is filed) has the opportunity to respond to the complaint. They can provide evidence and arguments in their defense.
4. Appointment of a Panel: KeNIC typically appoints an independent panel of experts to review the dispute. These experts are knowledgeable in domain name disputes and intellectual property matters.
5. Decision: The panel will review the evidence and arguments presented by both parties and render a decision. This decision may involve actions such as the cancellation, transfer, or retention of the domain name in question.
6. Appeal: In some cases, there may be a provision for appeal if either party disagrees with the panel's decision. The appeal process, if available, would typically be outlined in KeNIC's dispute resolution policies.
7. Enforcement: Once a decision is reached, KeNIC will enforce it, which may involve transferring the domain name to the rightful owner or taking other appropriate actions.
8. Fees: There may be fees associated with filing a complaint or participating in the dispute resolution process. The specific fee structure can be found on KeNIC's website or through the appointed dispute resolution service provider."

== See also ==
- Internet in Kenya
