= Daniel Ndambuki =

Kenyan comedian (born 1977)

Daniel Wambua
- Born: 30 October 1977 (age 48); Kitui, Kenya
- Citizenship: Kenyan
- Education: Mumbuni High School
- Occupation: Comedian

Daniel Wambua Ndambuki (born 30 October 1977), popularly known as Churchill, is a Kenyan comedian and television host. He is the creator and host of The Churchill Show, a comedy program on NTV Kenya (formerly on TV47). He also co-hosts a radio show on Classic 105 FM with Maina Kageni under the alias Mwalimu King'angi.

== Early life and career ==
Churchill was born in Kitui and later moved to Machakos, Kenya. He relocated to Nairobi in 1990 to live with his uncle following his time at Mumbuni High School. Early in his career, Churchill partnered with the comedians KJ, Kajairo, Mdomo Baggy, and Nyambane to create the television comedy show, Red Kona. Churchill also co-hosted a radio program with Maina Kageni on Classic 105 FM. In 2015, he was ranked 14th on a list of Kenya's 100 most influential people. In 2024, The Guardian credited Churchill with helping to bring Kenyan stand-up comedy into mainstream entertainment. CNN included him in a 2018 feature on prominent African comedians.

=== Churchill Show ===
The Churchill Show is a comedy program that includes interviews with Kenyan personalities, political figures, and individuals from various backgrounds. Some of the show's segments have become recognized in Kenyan pop culture. The Churchill Show has also toured various regions of Kenya.

=== Criticism of content ===
Churchill's show has been criticized for featuring content that is inappropriate for a family audience. A 2015 study suggested that the show's use of ethnic stereotypes might contribute to negative attitudes toward certain tribal groups and influence cross-ethnic communication.

In his analysis of the criticism of the show, Patrick Chesi Lumasia suggests that the show seeks to counter ethnic stereotypes through its multilingual approach, using English, Swahili, and Sheng, and featuring performers from the Kenyan Somali community. He further argues that the show's humor works to challenge traditional patriarchal structures within Kenyan families and portrays young Kenyan women in a way that emphasizes their agency and independence.

=== Treatment of comedians and crew ===
Several crew members and comedians who worked on The Churchill Show have publicly accused Churchill and the show's management of delayed payments or underpayment for their work. These complaints have raised concerns about working conditions, with some performers stating they faced financial difficulties despite the show's success. Churchill made several intermittent responses to the claims, but a formal public statement addressing the specific allegations was not issued.

The mental health of comedians associated with The Churchill Show has also received attention, particularly following the deaths of comedians such as Njenga Swahili, Kasee, and Othuol Othuol, all of whom were connected to the show. Others like Njoro and Paul Ogutu have reportedly sought treatment for alcoholism and depression.

=== Blackmail attempts ===
Churchill has publicly spoken about his experience being blackmailed internationally. He stated that individuals, allegedly from Nigeria, gained access to sensitive private information and attempted to extort him by threatening to release compromising materials if their demands were not met. Churchill stated that he spoke publicly about it to raise awareness about cybercrime and blackmail, particularly from cross-border criminals, and to encourage online data protection. He reported taking legal action and called for authorities to enhance measures against cybercrimes.

== Awards and honors ==
- 2015 OLX SOMA (Social Media Awards) – Overall Personality of the Year
- 2015 Bingwa Music Awards (BMA) – Showbiz Personality of the Year
- 2014 OLX SOMA (Social Media Awards) – Overall Personality of the Year
- 2014 OLX SOMA (Social Media Awards) – Most influential Media Personality
- 2013 OLX SOMA (Social Media Awards) – Winner Facebook Fan page of the Year
- 2013 OLX SOMA (Social Media Awards) – Overall Social Media Personality of the Year
- 2013 OLX SOMA (Social Media Awards) – Television Show of the Year
