= Yasmin Said =

Kenyan actress

- Born: 7 October 2000 (22 yrs); Nairobi, Kenya
- Occupation: Actress
- Known for: Maria
- Awards: 2020 Kalasha Awards for Best Lead Actress in a TV Drama

Yasmin Said (/ˈsaɪd/; born 7 October 2000) is a Kenyan actress who won an award for Best Lead Actress in TV Drama at the Kalasha Awards in 2020. Said was raised in Nairobi. She served as a brand ambassador for Indomie until 2021.

== Awards and nominations ==
Said won the Best Lead Actress in TV Drama award at Kalasha Awards in 2020 for her role in the series Maria on Citizen TV.

Year	Award	Category	Nominee(s)	Result	Ref.
2020	Kalasha Film & TV Awards	Best Lead Actress in TV Drama	Yasmin Said	Won	

== Filmography ==
Year	Title	Role
2019–2021	Maria	Maria
2020	Nakulove	Video vixen
2022–present	Sultana	TBH
