= KeNIC =

- Founded: 2003
- Location: Nairobi, Kenya
- Website: www.kenic.or.ke

KENIC (Kenya Network Information Centre) was established through the facilitation of the Communications Commission of Kenya. KENIC is the entity charged with the management and the administration of the dot ke Country Code Top-Level Domain (.ke ccTLD) name.

== ccTLD historical background ==
In 1993, .ke was delegated by Jon Postel, the Internet pioneer, to:

- Dr. Shem Ochuodho (Administrative point of contact), and
- Randy Bush (Technical point of contact)

Both Dr. Ochuodho and Randy Bush (USA) acted in a voluntary basis. In 2002/2003, .ke was re-delegated by the Internet Corporation for the Assigned Names and Numbers (ICANN) to:

- KENIC as the Administrative and Technical Point of Contact

== KENIC Board membership ==
KENIC board members are drawn from the Government, the private sector, the academia, the civil society and the founding .ke Administrative contact (Dr. Shem Ochuodho).
