= Africa Media Review =

- Discipline: Africa
- Language: English

Publication details
- History: 1986–present
- Publisher: African Council for Communication Education (Kenya)

Standard abbreviations
- ISO 4: Afr. Media Rev.

Indexing
- ISSN: 0258-4913

Links
- Journal homepage; online archive

Africa Media Review is a peer-reviewed academic journal covering communication theory, practice, and policy in Africa. It is a collaborative publication between the Council for the Development of Social Science Research in Africa (CODESRIA) based in Dakar, Senegal and the African Council for Communication Education (ACCE) in Nairobi, Kenya.
