= The EastAfrican =

Kenyan weekly newspaper

- Type: Weekly newspaper
- Owner(s): Nation Media Group
- Founded: 7 November 1994
- Country: Kenya
- Website: theeastafrican.co.ke

The EastAfrican is a weekly newspaper published in Kenya since 7 November 1994, by the Nation Media Group, which also publishes Kenya's national Daily Nation. The EastAfrican also circulates in the other countries of the African Great Lakes region, including Tanzania, Uganda, and Rwanda. It contains stories and in-depth analysis from each country in the region, in addition to international stories.

In 1993, the Nation Group's managing editor, Wangethi Mwangi, requested experienced British journalist Gerry Loughran to return to Kenya to establish a regional newspaper. Joined by future editor Joseph Odindo and future marketing manager Jerry Okungu, Loughran traveled to Nairobi, Mombasa, Kisumu, Kampala, Arusha, Dar es Salaam, and Zanzibar to discuss a newspaper's establishment with readers, advertisers, and distributors. Its name originated with Lough's suggestion: with "EastAfrican" signifying unity and the omission of "nation", an appeal to a transnational audience. As such, staffers were hired, and the publication set up in Kampala, Arusha, and Dar es Saleem. John Githongo and Charles Onyango-Obbo were recruited and operated in Kenya and Kampala, respectively. The first issue was published on 7 November 1994.

== See also ==
- Mass media in Kenya
- Telecommunications in Kenya
