= Eddie Butita =

Kenyan-born comedian, actor, script writer, director, emcee, producer and businessman

Edwin Butita
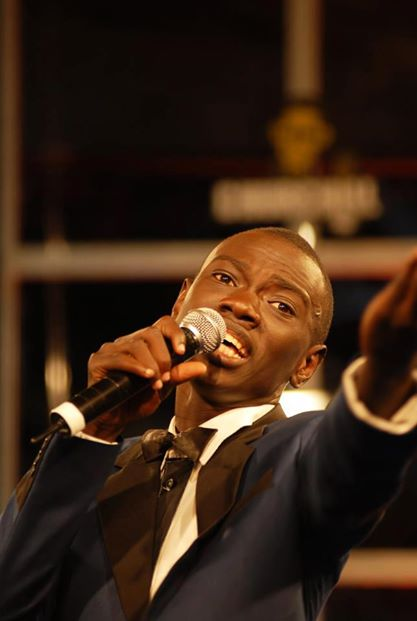
- Butita on Churchill Show
- Born: Edwin Butita; 16 November 1992 (age 33); Nairobi
- Children: 1

Comedy career
- Years active: 2010–present
- Website: eddiebutita.co.ke

Edwin Butita, popularly known by his stage name Eddie Butita (born 16 November 1992), is a Kenyan-born comedian, actor, script writer, theatre director, emcee, theatre producer, and businessman.

== Early life and education ==
Born in Kariobangi South, Butita mastered his comedy and entertaining skills while still in high school. He went to Butere high school for his secondary education and later pursued a course in graphic design.

== Career ==
=== Comedy ===
He then began his stage career, appearing in several TV shows in Kenya, with his comedic style of parodying the ghetto life in Africa. His professional stand-up act started in 2010, during the Churchill live season. Many were surprised that a new act could keep critical crowds amused. Butita has performed in Kenya's most popular shows: Laugh Festival, Churchill Show, Churchill Raw, Night of a Thousand Laughs, Kenya's Biggest Laughs, The Hot Seat, Kenya Kona Comedy, Crazy Monday Comedy Night, Nescafe Red Sensation Party, 3D Comedy and Kids Festival, among others.

Butita has been in the Showbiz gallery as an entertainer, and is the CEO of his company, Stage Presence Media. He is also a featured guest on Kenya's NTV (Kenya) weekly evening show "The Trend" where he is a comic relief. He was among the team that directed and translated the Swahili version of the Netflix show the Upshaw. Butita is the director and writer of the comedy series A Nurse Toto. He was awarded Order of the Grand Warrior on December 12, 2023, during Jamhuri Day celebration by HE William Ruto .https://www.tuko.co.ke/entertainment/celebrities/531212-njugush-abel-mutua-eddie-butita-receive-ogw-honours-william-ruto/
