= J Blessing =

Kenyan music video producer and cinematographer

- Born: Jibril Blessing; 15 April 1988 (age 38)
- Occupations: Filmmaker, music video director, cinematographer
- Years active: 2008-present
- Notable work: Churchill Show director, Link Video Global, Keep Pace Africa, Digitone Agency
- Website: www.jblessing.com

Jibril Blessing (born 15 April 1988), professionally known as J Blessing or jblessing, is a Kenyan cinematographer and music video and television producer and director. He is the cinematographer and director of the TV comedy series The Churchill Show.

== Early life and education ==
Blessing grew up in the suburbs of Komarock Phase 2, near Zone 3 and started out as a dancer. He studied at the Los Angeles Film School in California.

== Career ==
After working as a freelance video director and producer, Blessing founded Link Video Global, a production company based in Nairobi. He also owns Digitone Agency and is co-founder and CEO of Keep Pace Africa. Musicians and producers who credit him for starting their careers include Willy Paul and music video producer Young Wallace.

Blessing is the longest-serving video producer on The Churchill Show. As of December 2019 he was also developing new shows for the production company, Laugh Industry.

== Personal life ==
Until 2017, Blessing was in a long-term relationship with Chantelle, with whom he had a son, who died young. Since 2018, he has been rumored to be in a relationship with singer Avril and to have fathered a child by her, but he introduced a different woman as his girlfriend in November 2018. He is the father of singer Laika's first child.

== Awards and nominations ==
Year	Nominee / work	Award	Result
?	Video Director of The Year	Mwafaka Awards	Won
2011	Best Video Director	Groove Awards	Won
2011	Best Video Director	Mwafaka Awards	Won
2012	Best Video Director	Groove Awards	Nominated
2013	Best Video Director	Mwafaka Awards	Won
2014	Best Video Director	Mwafaka Awards	Won
2014	Best Video Director	Uganda's VIGA Awards	Nominated

== Videography ==
Video:inspire	Artist: nameles
"Mpenzi"	Willy Paul
"Koffi Yo"	Master Piece ft Dk and Cabassa
"Beautiful People"	Eko Dyda
"Conquerer"	Joyce Omondi
"Sari Sari"	Dk Kwenye Beat featuring Antoneosol
"My City My Town"	Prezzo and Cannibal
"Prophesy"	Exodus
"Just a Way"	Kaberere and Mr Vee
"Msaidizi"	Gloria Muliro
"Pendo"	Guardian Angel
"We Be Happening"	All Stars
"Zongelela"	Soc
"Pokea Sifa"	Lady Bee
"Yaweh"	Denno ft Danco
"dace ya boss"	Koffi Olomide
"still standing"	Cindy Sanyu
"Tucheze"	Ferre Gola ft.Victoria Kimani
"Baraka zangu"	Rebecca Soki
"Hold Me"	Monique ft. Ketchup
