= Stevo Simple Boy =

Kenyan rapper

- Born: Stephen Otieno Adera; 28 January 1990 (age 36); Oyugis, Homabay County, Kenya.
- Genres: Hip hop
- Occupations: Rapper; singer; songwriter
- Instrument: Vocals
- Years active: 2015–present
- Label: Men in Business

Stevo Simple Boy, born Stephen Otieno Adera (born 28 January 1990), is a Kenyan rapper. He raps about social issues that affect the society. In 2019 he rose to fame after he released his song "Mihadarati" where he was addressing the dangers of drugs. This came after his appearance in Ebru TV's "Chipukeezy Show"

== Early life ==
Stevo was born and raised in Oyugis, Homabay county in a family of two before moving to Nairobi. He has been in the music scene since 2007 but started recording in 2015.

== Music career ==
Stevo rose to fame in 2019 after a song he had previously released in 2017 dubbed "Mihadarati" hit the headlines. The song was played in several radio and TV stations in the region since it addressed the dangers of drug abuse. Stevo was named ambassador of the National Authority for the Campaign Against Alcohol and Drug Abuse (NACADA) of Kenya in the same year 2019.

In late 2019, Stevo released a song titled "Inauma" which translates to "it hurts". This track was inspired by the trolls he receives online. The singer has received online trolls several times throughout his career.

In 2020 he released a song titled "Tuheshimu Ndoa" which translates to "respect marriages". In the song he talks about marriage and encourages couples to respect marriages.

In 2022 early January, Stevo parted ways with his old management and joined a management and record label called Men in Business. Through a joint alliance from Vaga Genius (C.E.O – Men in Business) and Vinc on the Beat they helped revive his musical career with the song "Ni Nani" featuring Adasa.

== Discography ==
=== Charted singles ===
List of charted singles, showing year released, chart positions and album name
| Title | Year | Peak chart position | Album |
| Title | Year | JAM Air. | Album |
|---|---|---|---|
| "Vijana tuache mihadarati" | 2017 | 7 | Vijana tuache mihadarati |
