= People Daily =

Kenyan online newspaper

People Daily (Note: The article was originally published by the People Daily in April 2018, shortly after Matiba's death)
- Type: Daily newspaper
- Format: Digital-only
- Owner: Mediamax Network Limited
- Founder: Kenneth Matiba
- Managing editor: Emeka-Mayaka Gekara
- Founded: 1992; 34 years ago
- Ceased publication: 29 November 2024 (print edition only)
- Language: English
- Headquarters: DSM Place, Kijabe Street, Nairobi, Kenya
- Country: Kenya
- OCLC number: 70206658
- Website: peopledaily.digital

People Daily is a Kenyan English-language online newspaper headquartered in Nairobi.

== History ==
It was established by activist and politician Kenneth Matiba in early 1993 as The People Weekly, a weekly newspaper. Matiba decided to establish his own newspaper after his request to feature an advertisement denying Daniel Moi's victory at the 1992 Kenyan general election. His add was rejected without reason. At the time of its founding it was Kenya's fourth national newspaper. Its first slogan was "Fair, Frank and Fearless".

It became a daily newspaper in 1999. Matiba sold it to Mediamax Network Limited in 2009 which is owned by the Uhuru Kenyatta family.

On 1 April 2014 it became Kenya's first freely distributed newspaper.

=== Digital-only transition (2024–present) ===
It published its final print edition on 29 November 2024 and now operates exclusively in digital form; website and applications. It stated the decision was made to attract younger, digital-savvy readers and reduce the environmental effects of printed newspapers. According to TechCabal, the decision was influenced by declining advertisement revenue and changing reader habits.

== Readership ==
In an April 2018 article, published after Kenneth Matiba's death, it claimed to have the largest print circulation in the country at the time.

== New York Times collaboration ==
In a 4 April 2025 article, it announced a new collaboration with the American newspaper, The New York Times that would allow it to access "high-quality international reporting on politics, business, science, technology, health, climate change, and global affairs, curated" from The New York Times. Under the collaboration, People Daily would improve its reporting with content from The Times. The article cited both newspapers as valuing truth, integrity and public interest journalism. The Times is yet to confirm the collaboration.

== Leadership ==
Emeka-Mayaka Gekara serves as its Managing Editor.

== Alleged government abduction of journalist ==
Habil Onyango is a People Daily journalist that was working on an investigative story about the Homa Bay County government's employment fraud scandal. On 14 September 2025, Onyango was allegedly lured and held captive at a hotel room in Homa Bay where he was tortured by Beatrice Mercy Akugo, a Senior Human Resource County Officer and other attackers. The journalistic piece alleged that Mercy Akugo took bribes in exchange for county-level jobs. The torture resulted in damage to his ribs, and soft tissue damage including on his face to the point of having difficulty eating to a damaged jaw. Apart from the assault, he was forced to inhale cannabis, his equipment was stolen and data on it deleted.

The Media Council of Kenya condemned his supposed abduction and torture, calling for "swift, transparent investigations" by the Directorate of Criminal Investigations, the Independent Policing Oversight Authority and the Office of the Director of Public Prosecutions. It was also condemned by the International Federation of Journalists, the Kenya Union of Journalists, and the International Press Institute who also urged for a thorough criminal investigations.
