= Serah Mwihaki =

Kenyan Actress, Scriptwriter and Producer

- Born: 1978 (age 47–48); Nairobi, Kenya
- Occupations: Actress; Scriptwriter; Producer
- Years active: 2002 - present
- Notable work: Changes (TV series); Nairobi Half Life; Kidnapped

Serah Mwihaki (born 1978) is a Kenyan actress and scriptwriter. She kicked off her acting career with a lead role in Kenyan Film Dangerous Affairs in 2002. She created TV Series Changes that was adopted by M-NET in 2009 and co-wrote Nairobi Half Life in 2012 and Kidnapped.

Her previous experiences include working for literal journal Kwani? as a salesperson, as a director's runner in the movie The Constant Gardener in 2005, as a production coordinator at Baraka Films then Urbane Diaspora Productions before joining her current workstation. Serah is a member of the Oscars Selection Committee Kenya (OCSK) and the Kenya Writers Guild.

== Career ==
After kicking off acting in Dangerous Affairs, Serah went on to feature in Kenyan drama and soap opera Wingu la Moto between 2003 and 2006, then as an extra in the Garden of Eden in 2008, then in Changes as a School Principal.

After creating and scripting Changes that morphed to Changes II (2010) then Changes III (2011), Nairobi Half Life and Kidnapped (2017 Film), Serah became a co-writer in TV Series' Kona (TV series) (2012), Selina - Telenovela (2018), Crime & Justice (2021).
