= Inooro TV =

- Country: Kenya
- Broadcast area: Kenya; Worldwide through media streaming, Facebook, Viusasa, X and YouTube
- Affiliates: Citizen TV; Inooro FM
- Headquarters: Communications Centre, Maalim Juma Rd, off Denis Pritt Road in Hurlingham area, Nairobi

Programming
- Language: Kikuyu
- Picture format: HDTV 1080i

Ownership
- Owner: Royal Media Services Ltd
- Parent: Citizen TV
- Sister channels: Ramogi TV

History
- Launched: 26 October 2015; 10 years ago

Links
- Website: https://www.citizen.digital/tv/inooro-tv-14

Inooro TV is a free-to-air vernacular TV station owned by Royal Media Services broadcasting in the Kikuyu Language. It was launched on 26 October 2015.

== Programs ==
- Kiririmbi
- Irio To Githeri
- Thuthira Ngoro
- Saavi ki savari
- Amukira Ngatho
- Menya Kihoto Giaku
- Mitugo Na Miikarire Ya Agikuyu
- Ithaga Riene
- Centrocinema
- Inooro Miaraho
- Bururi Wa Ciana
- Geria Munyaka
- Wathire Ku?
- Kimuri Live
- Ruci-Ini
- Rurumuka
- Uria Ndagitari
- Hosanna
- Mwigangaro Live
- Wirekererie Urban Live
- Inooro Thaa Ithatu
- Kum Kum Baghya
- Inooro Hwa-Ini
