= KTN News Kenya =

KTN News
- Former logo used until November 2021
- Broadcast area: East Africa
- Network: Kenya Television Network
- Headquarters: The Standard Group PLC, Mombasa Road, Embakasi, Nairobi

Programming
- Languages: English, Swahili
- Picture format: 4:3 (576i SDTV)

Ownership
- Owner: Standard Media Group
- Sister channels: Kenya Television Network

History
- Launched: 1 July 2015
- Closed: 7 August 2024; 20 months ago

Links
- Website: www.standardmedia.co.ke/ktnnews/

KTN News is a news channel owned and operated by the Standard Group as a news and current affairs subsidiary of Kenya Television Network. KTN News associates with current events and affairs facing Kenya. It is mostly news, updates and stories coverage and is one of the fastest growing TV stations in Kenya. It had content that include sports, documentaries and investigative series. The station was launched in 2015 according to the Standard Media Group, which houses the station and Kenya Television Network (KTN). It broadcasts in Swahili and English.

== YouTube ==
The KTN Kenya YouTube channel has been posting videos since 2008, which predates its 2015 establishment; the channel was previously owned and managed by its parent company. It has posted more than 191, 000 videos and has received more than 1.2 billion views with over 3.4 million subscribers by 1 May 2026. KTN Kenya also has a secondary YouTube channel, KTNClassics, the KTNClassics videos are videos that were aired live in the Kenya Television Network.

== Programming ==
List of programs aired by KTN
