= Nation FM (Kenya) =

Nairobi; Kenya
- Frequency: 96.3 MHz

Programming
- Language: English

Ownership
- Owner: Nation Media Group

History
- First air date: 2002
- Former names: Easy FM

Links
- Website: ntvkenya.co.ke/nationfm/

Nation FM, formerly known as Easy FM, is an English-speaking national radio station based in Nairobi, Kenya. It is owned by the Nation Media Group. Nation FM was broadcasting as of December 2019.
