= K24 TV =

Kenyan television channel

- K24 Kenya logo
- Country: Kenya
- Broadcast area: Kenya
- Headquarters: 3rd Floor, DSM Place; Kijabe Street, Nairobi; Kenya

Programming
- Languages: British English; Kenyan Swahili

Ownership
- Owner: Mediamax Network Ltd

History
- Founded: 2007; 19 years ago
- Launched: February 4, 2008; 18 years ago

Links
- Website: k24tv.co.ke

Availability

Terrestrial
- DStv: Channel 275
- GOtv: Channel 21
- Zuku TV: Channel 15
- StarTimes: Channel 488
- DTT: Available on Signet and other DTT signal distributors
- Azam TV: Channel 332

K24 TV, is a TV station in Kenya established in 2007 and launched on February 4, 2008. K24 was the first Kenyan television station to stream live on the internet, giving diaspora viewers a taste of real Kenyan stories told in real time.

K24 averages 3.1 hours of weekly watch time. It is powered by Mediamax Network Ltd, which was established in 2009 and is now one of the fastest-growing media houses in Kenya. The group owns K24 TV, the vernacular station Kameme TV, the free newspaper People Daily and several radio stations, namely: Kameme FM, Mayian FM, Emoo FM, Meru FM and Msenangu FM.

== YouTube ==
K24 has been posting content on YouTube since 2008. The channel has uploaded more than 52,000 videos and has garnered over 102 million views and more than 1.48 million subscribers.

== Programming ==
List of programs broadcast by K24 (Kenya)

- Weekend with Betty
- Punchline
- Inuka
- K24 This Morning
- K24 Daily Brief
- K24 News Cut
- K24 Mashinani
- K24 Saa Moja
- K24 Evening Edition
- Sweetest Love
- Sports Hub Live
- Jus Kids
- Beatbox
- Beating Again
- Gabriella
- Riddim Vybz Reloaded
- Party Ready

== Awards ==
- Kalasha Kituo Halisi Award in 2018
