= Media Council of Kenya =

Independent national institution regulating media standards and journalism in Kenya

TheMedia Council of Kenya is an independent national institution established by the Media Act, of 2004 as the leading institution in the regulation of media and the conduct and discipline of journalists in Kenya. It is mandated amongst other functions to register and accredit journalists, register media establishments, handle complaints from the public, create and publish yearly media audits on Media Freedom in Kenya. During accreditation, the journalists agree to adhere to the Code of Conduct and Practice of Journalism in Kenya, which was created by media practitioners and stakeholders, with the view of making Journalism in Kenya a more professional and respectable field.

Before the Media Act 2007, the Media Council of Kenya was a self-regulatory body formed in 2004 by media stakeholders, to regulate the media and prevent the government from creating a regulatory body. It was only after agreements between the Government of Kenya and the media stakeholders in Kenya that it converted from a self-regulatory to a statutory body in 2007.

Council membership is drawn from media stakeholders in Kenya including the Media Owners Association, Kenya Union of Journalists, Kenya Correspondents Association, Kenya Editors Guild, Public Relations Society of Kenya, Kenya News Agency, Private and Public Universities, the Kenya Institute of Mass Communication and the Law Society of Kenya.
