= The Star (Kenya) =

Kenyan newspaper

- Type: Daily newspaper
- Format: Tabloid
- Owner(s): Radio Africa Group, Kenya
- Publisher: Radio Africa Group, Kenya
- Founded: July 2007
- Language: English
- Headquarters: Nairobi
- Country: Kenya
- Price: 60 shillings physical, paywall digital
- Website: www.the-star.co.ke

The Star is a daily newspaper published in Nairobi, Kenya. It was launched in July 2007 as the Nairobi Star and later rebranded as The Star in 2009.

The Star's circulation was around 15,000–20,000 in 2010 (against total Kenyan newspaper circulation in 2010 of around 320,000), compared to 5,000–8,000 in 2007. The paper first made a profit in September 2009.

== See also ==
- List of newspapers in Kenya
