= Kenya Broadcasting Corporation =

State-run media organisation of Kenya

- Type: Terrestrial television and radio broadcast network
- Country: Kenya
- Availability: Kenya
- Founded: 1924; 102 years ago; as East Africa Broadcasting Corporation by Colonial administration of British Kenya
- Market share: 4.26% (TV by viewership); <2% (Radio by audience)
- Headquarters: Kenya Broadcasting Corporation, Harry Thuku Road, Nairobi
- Broadcast area: Kenya
- Owner: Government of Kenya
- Launch date: 1924 (radio); 1962 (television)
- Official website: www.kbc.co.ke

Kenya Broadcasting Corporation (KBC) is Kenya's state-owned television and radio broadcaster. It operates radio services in English, Swahili and several other languages spoken in Kenya, as well as television services.

Radio broadcasting in Kenya began in 1924 with English-language programmes aimed at white settlers. Broadcasts directed at African audiences began during the Second World War, and African Broadcasting Services was established in 1953, carrying programmes in Swahili and several other languages. Kenya Broadcasting Services followed in 1954, and the Kenya Broadcasting Corporation was formed in 1961 to take over broadcasting services from it. Television was introduced in 1962. In 1964, KBC was nationalised as Voice of Kenya through an Act of Parliament; the Kenya Broadcasting Corporation name was restored in 1989.

Since then, KBC has expanded and modernised its transmission network and introduced additional radio and television services, including regional and language-specific radio stations. Its radio network includes services in languages such as Kikuyu, Maasai, Luo, Kamba, Luhya and Somali.

== History of KBC ==
- 1924: English radio broadcasting began. The broadcasts targeted white settlers who monitored news from their home and other parts of the world.
- The first radio broadcasts targeting Africans came during the Second World War to inform parents and relatives of African soldiers what was happening at the war front.
- 1953: The first broadcast service was created for Africans. African Broadcasting Services carried programmes in Kiswahili, Dholuo, Kikuyu, Kinandi, Kiluhya, Kikib and Arabic.
- 1954: Kenya Broadcasting Services was established. Regional stations were set up in Mombasa (Sauti ya Mvita), Nyeri (Mount Kenya Station) and Kisumu (Lake Station).
- 1961: Kenya Broadcasting Corporation was formed to take over broadcasting services from the government controlled Kenya Broadcasting Services.
- 1962: Television was introduced in Kenya. The first transmitting station was set on a farm house in Limuru and the station transmitted to a radius of 24 kilometres (15 mi).
- 1 July 1964: Kenya Broadcasting Corporation was nationalised into Voice of Kenya through an Act of Parliament.
- 1971: Television broadcasts are extended to Mombasa, with its own schedule.
- 1978: Kenya television transitioned to colour.
- 1980: a new television station opened in Mombasa to relay programmes and produce local dramas, music, cultural and other programmes
- 1989: the Voice of Kenya changed back to Kenya Broadcasting Corporation through an Act of Parliament.
- 1989: a contract was signed between KBC and Japan Telecommunications Engineering consultancy service (JETC) for improvement and expansion of the national medium wave frequency radio broadcasting network.
- 1991: KBC signed a contract with Marubeni Corporation of Tokyo, Japan for upgrading of medium wave transmitting stations and construction of new ones.
- 1993: KBC embarked on a major modernisation project to upgrade its transmitting station, construct new ones and improve on switching and routing network.
- 1996: KBC commissioned Metro FM as a 90% music radio.
- September 2000: KBC commissioned Metro Television as a sports and entertainment channel.
- December 2000: KBC started Coro FM, transmitting in Kikuyu language to Nairobi and Mount Kenya Region.
- 2001: Pwani FM was started to cater to the Coast Region.
- 2009: Signet subsidiary is first launched.
- 2021: KBC TV rebranded. A line-up of changes were unveiled, including a new logo. The station brought on board fresh faces and returned former news presenters including Catherine Kasavuli, Fayyaz Qureishi, Badi Muhsin, and Pauline Sheghu.

== Radio stations ==
| Station | Language | Launch date | Website |
| KBC English Service | English | 1924 | kbcenglish.co.ke |
| KBC Western Service | Pokot and Teso | 1952 | |
| Radio Taifa | Swahili | 1953 | |
| KBC Eastern Service | Turkana, Rendille, Burji, and Borana | 1972 | |
| Coro FM | Kikuyu | 2000 | corofm.co.ke |
| Pwani FM | Swahili for the Coastal region | 2001 | pwanifm.kbc.co.ke |
| Nosim FM | Maasai | 2011 | |
| Minto FM | Kisii | 2011 | |
| Kitwek FM | Kalenjin | 2011 | |
| Mwago FM | Meru | 2011 | |
| Mayienga FM | Luo | 2011 | |
| Mwatu FM | Kamba | 2012 | |
| Ingo FM | Luhya | 2012 | |
| Iftiin FM | Somali | | iftiinfm.co.ke |
| Bula cadaan FM | Somali | | |
