= Kenya Television Network =

Kenyan television network

KTN
- Country: Kenya
- Broadcast area: Kenya
- Headquarters: The Standard Group PLC, Mombasa Road, Embakasi, Nairobi

Programming
- Languages: English; Swahili

Ownership
- Owner: Standard Group
- Sister channels: KTN News Kenya

History
- Launched: 5 March 1990; 36 years ago

Links
- Webcast: Livestream
- Website: www.standardmedia.co.ke/ktnhome/ www.standardmedia.co.ke/ktnnews

Availability

Terrestrial
- DStv: Channel 272
- Zuku TV: Channel 12
- GOtv: Channel 18
- StarTimes: Channel 510
- DTT: Available on Signet, ADN, and other DTT signal distributors
- Azam TV: Channel 336

Kenya Television Network (KTN) is a Kenyan free-to-air television network that was launched in March 1990 by Jared Kangwana. It is headquartered at Standard Group Centre, Nairobi. It was the first privately owned free-to-air television network in Africa, and the first to break Kenya Broadcasting Corporation's (KBC) monopoly in Kenya.

KTN became famous for activist journalism in the 1990s.

== History ==
Former KTN logo

After its launch in 1990, KTN rebroadcast programmes from CNN International, MTV Europe and other European, American and Australian television channels, in addition to TV networks from other African states. KTN started out as a pilot project for a 24-hour subscription-television channel in Nairobi and its surroundings. However, plans to scramble its signal were abandoned, and for most of the 1990s, KTN derived its revenue from advertisement and TV production services. Founded by Jared Kangwana, its early success attracted bids for joint ownership from London-based Maxwell Communications, South African MNET, and the then-ruling party Kenya African National Union (KANU). The station won the bid to carry the 1992 Summer Olympics, as well as the rights to several other international events. In 1992, M-Net planned to buy the network, but these plans were denied by its staff, as they demanded M-Net to provide technical co-operation instead.

While Jared Kangwana planned to expand KTN, and had built new facilities to house the station, he granted KTN's news division free rein. KANU functionaries are said to have frequently called the newsroom and editors on behalf of the president of Kenya, Daniel arap Moi, in order to censor news stories. This control was said to have been sanctioned by Moi himself, who had developed the habit while he was still vice-president under president Jomo Kenyatta. As vice-president, Daniel arap Moi had grown used to make regular calls to the offices of The Standard which was foreign-owned at that time, and to other media outlets, to demand that they drop stories or modify them. The practice was revived when KTN was established.

In October 1993 security officers boarded a commercial airliner, seized the passport of KTN Director Jared Kangwana, and prevented him from leaving on a business trip. Kangwana said that the act was part of a government intimidation campaign to force him to relinquish control of KTN to the then-ruling party, KANU. The government took no action to institute criminal proceedings against Kangwana but ultimately succeeded in forcing him to cede the company to KANU. The station is since 9 December 1997 part of The Standard Group, which also publishes The Standard newspaper.

In March 1998, KTN started airing a four-hour block relaying South African network Channel O. The channel was aiming to introduce a new schedule effective 4 May 1998.

The channel started nationwide broadcasts in 2002; until then, it had only covered Nairobi due to expensive costs of expansion.

== Programs ==
KTN was well known for entertainment shows but now programming consists of soap operas, long talk shows and CNN night time streaming. Entertainment including sitcoms, thriller/detective, drama, action series and children's classics are no longer carried.

Listed below are some of the shows the network was famous for;

=== Imported shows ===
==== children's ====
- (United States) Adventures from the Book of Virtues
- (United States) Alvin and the Chipmunks
- (United States) Angel's Friends
- (United States) Animaniacs
- (United Kingdom) Art Attack
- (United States) Barney & Friends
- (United States) Justice League (TV series)
- (United States) Superman The Animated Series
- (United States) Batman of the Future
- (United States) Batman: The Animated Series
- (United States) (Canada) Beast Machines: Transformers
- (Canada) Being Ian
- (Japan) Bob in a Bottle
- (United States) (Canada) (China) Braceface
- (United States) Captain Planet and the Planeteers
- (United States) Casper the Friendly Ghost
- (United Kingdom) Count Duckula
- (United States) (France) Denver, the Last Dinosaur
- (United States) Doug
- (United States) The Fairly OddParents!
- (United States) Felix the Cat
- (United States) The Flintstones
- (United States) Where on Earth Is Carmen Sandiego?
- (Australia) Hi-5
- (United States) (Hong Kong) Jackie Chan Adventures
- (United Kingdom) (Canada) Jim Henson's The Hoobs
- (Canada) (Hong Kong) (Singapore) The New Adventures of Nanoboy
- (United Kingdom) Mr Bean: The Animated Series
- (United States) Fat Dog Mendoza
- (United States) Johnny Bravo
- (United States) Kim Possible
- (Italy) Farhat: The Prince of the Desert
- (United States) Get Ed
- (United States) Samurai Jack
- (United States) SpongeBob SquarePants
- (United States) The Little Rascals
- (Australia) Mission Top Secret
- (Japan) The New Adventures of Kimba The White Lion
- (United Kingdom) New Captain Scarlet
- (Canada) The Odyssey
- (United States) Out of the Box
- (United States) The Puzzle Place
- (United States) Phineas and Ferb
- (United States) The Emperor's New School
- (United States) The Pink Panther Show
- (United States) The Real Ghostbusters
- (United States) Recess
- (United States) The Road Runner Show
- (Japan) (France) Saban's Adventures of the Little Mermaid
- (United States) SilverHawks
- (France) Sky Dancers
- (United States) (Canada) Star Wars: Ewoks
- (United States) Tom & Jerry Kids
- (Australia) Tracey McBean
- (United States) What's New, Scooby-Doo?
- (United States) X-Men: Evolution
- (United States) American Dragon:Jake Long
- (United States) The Proud Family
- (Canada) Atomic Betty
- (Canada) Jacob Two Two
- (Canada) 6teen
- (United States) Fatherhood
- (United States) The Wild Thornberrys
- (United States) Lilo & Stitch
- (United States) Johnny Test
- (Canada) The Boy
- (United States) Justice League
- (United States) My life as a teenage robot
- (United States) Danny Phantom
- (Canada) Braceface
- (United States) Hey Arnold!
- (Canada) Ned's Newt
- (United States) Legion of Super Heroes

==== Drama ====
- (United States) 7th Heaven
- (United States) 24
- (United States) Alias
- (United States) Angel
- (United States) Baywatch
- (Canada) Being Erica
- (United States) Buffy the Vampire Slayer
- (United States) Charmed
- (United States) Cold Case
- (United States) The Commish
- (United States) Dawson’s Creek
- (United States) Desperate Housewives
- (United States) Ed
- (United States) ER
- (South Africa) Jacob's Cross
- (United States) Judging Amy
- (United States) (Canada) Kung Fu: The Legend Continues
- (United States) Lois & Clark: The New Adventures of Superman
- (United States) Lost
- (United States) L.A. Law
- (United States) Monk
- (United States) Murphy Brown
- (United States) Prison Break
- (United States) Renegade
- (United States) (Australia) Time Trax

==== Reality ====
- (United States) The Rebel Billionaire: Branson's Quest for the Best
- (United States) Beyond Chance
- (United States) Survivor
- (United States) Endurance
- (United States) Nanny 911
- (United Kingdom) How Clean is Your House?
- (United States) The Apprentice
- (United States) Ride with Funkmaster Flex

==== Soap Opera ====
- (United States) Days of Our Lives
- (South Africa) Egoli: Place of Gold
- (United States) Fashion House
- (United States) Melrose Place
- (Australia) Neighbours
- (Philippines) The Stepdaughters
- (Philippines) The General's Daughter
- (Philippines) The Promise
- (Philippines) A Love to Last
- (Philippines) Lost Hearts
- (Philippines) Doble Kara
- (Philippines) A Mother's Guilt
- (Philippines) Prima Donnas
- (Philippines) Los Bastardos

==== Comedy ====
- (United States) 100 Deeds for Eddie McDowd
- (United States) 227
- (United States) All of Us
- (United States) Amen
- (United Kingdom) The Benny Hill Show
- (United States) The Bernie Mac Show
- (South Africa) The Coconuts
- (United Kingdom) Desmond's
- (United States) Diff'rent Strokes
- (United States) Eve
- (United States) Everybody Hates Chris
- (United States) Family Matters
- (United States) Friends
- (United States) Full House
- (United States) Golden Girls
- (United States) Good Times
- (United States) Hangin' with Mr. Cooper
- (United States) Herman's Head
- (United States) How I Met Your Mother
- (United States) The Jamie Foxx Show
- (United States) The Jamie Kennedy Experiment
- (United States) The Jeffersons
- (Canada) Just for Laughs: Gags
- (Canada) Just Kidding
- (United States) Kate & Allie
- (United States) Less than Perfect
- (United States) Martin
- (United Kingdom) Men Behaving Badly
- (United States) The Muppet Show
- (United States) Nurses
- (United States) The Parent 'Hood
- (United States) Perfect Strangers
- (United States) Phil of the Future
- (United States) Romeo!
- (United States) Sanford and Son
- (United States) Scrubs
- (United States) The Simpsons
- (United States) Sister, Sister
- (United States) The Steve Harvey Show
- (United States) The Soul Man
- (United States) The Wayans Bros.

==== Talk Shows ====
- (United States) The Oprah Winfrey Show
- (United States) Tyra Banks Show
- (United States) The Martha Stewart Show
- (United States) Steve Harvey

==== Game Shows ====
- (United States) You Bet Your Life
- (United States) So You Think You Can Dance
- (United States) Dance 360
- (United States) Don't Forget the Lyrics!
- (United Kingdom) Total Wipeout
- (Japan) Ninja Warrior
- (United States) American Ninja Warrior Junior

==== Anthology ====
- (United States) This Is the Life
