= NTV (Kenyan TV channel) =

Kenyan television channel

- Country: Kenya
- Broadcast area: Kenya
- Headquarters: Nation Centre, Kimathi Street, Central Nairobi

Programming
- Languages: Swahili and English
- Picture format: 1080i HDTV

Ownership
- Owner: Nation Media Group
- Sister channels: Q TV (Defunct Swahili only channel)

History
- Launched: 10 December 1999; 26 years ago
- Former names: Nation TV

Links
- Webcast: Livestream
- Website: ntvkenya.co.ke

Availability

Terrestrial
- StarTimes: Channel 512
- DStv: Channel 271
- Zuku TV: Channel 13
- GOtv: Channel 16
- DTT: Available on Signet, ADN, and other DTT signal distributors
- Azam TV: Channel 333

NTV is a Kenyan general entertainment channel. It has used its current name since 2005.. It is a popular TV station in Kenya along with Citizen TV, Kenya Television Network and Kenya Broadcasting Corporation.

== History ==
As Nation TV, the channel launched at 8pm on 10 December 1999 on UHF channel 42 in Nairobi, becoming the sixth Kenyan TV station overall to launch.

The channel was rebranded on 11 May 2005 as a revamp from the previous Nation TV station under the Nation Media Group arm that has been in existence since 1997. The relaunch came with state-of-the-art technology new to a television station in East and Central Africa, as well as its OB van.

NTV adopted its current logo on 7 July 2009.

In March 2010, NTV was made available on DStv Mobile, while its terrestrial signal was made available in South Nyanza.

Per 2010 and 2011 Synovate surveys, NTV was the second most-watched channel in Kenya, behind Citizen. NTV shut down its analogue signal together with two competing private networks in late December 2013, as part of the migration to digital terrestrial television in Kenya.

=== YouTube presence ===
In September 2007, NTV went online with its content on YouTube. Within the first month it received over 325,000 views, three honors, and an average of 4,000 views for every video uploaded. In mid-2012, NTV went live on YouTube. Following this move, the blogosphere was awash with accolades with NTV's US correspondent (BMJ) Ben Mutua Jonathan Muriithi terming it a techno-revolution for mass media among Kenyans across the globe.

== Programming ==
Some of the programmes available are listed below.

- Wicked Edition
- Auntie Boss!
- NTV Wild Talk
- Churchill Show
- Generation 3
- Victoria's Lounge
- AM Live
- NTV at One
- NTV Tonight
- NTV Weekend Edition
- NTV Jioni
- NTV Wikendi
- NTV Adhuhuri
- Real Househelps of Kawangware
- Asintado
- Tres veces Ana
- Tamu tamu
- The Trend
- Teen Republik
