= Citizen TV =

Kenyan television channel

Coordinates: 1.286546°S 36.791138°E

- Country: Kenya
- Headquarters: Communications Centre, Maalim Juma Rd, off Denis P ritt Road in Hurlingham area, Nairobi

Programming
- Languages: English, Swahili
- Picture format: 1080i (HDTV) (Downgraded to letterboxed 576i for SDTV feed)

Ownership
- Owner: Royal Media Services Ltd

History
- Launched: 1999; 27 years ago

Links
- Website: www.citizen.digital

Availability

Terrestrial
- DStv: Channel 273
- GOtv: Channel 17
- Zuku TV: Channel 11
- StarTimes: Channel 513
- Azam TV: Channel 334
- DTT: Available on Signet, ADN, and other DTT signal distributors

Citizen TV is a Kenyan free-to-air television channel owned by Royal Media Services. It broadcasts primarily in English and Swahili. The channel was launched in 1999 and relaunched in June 2006. Royal Media Services also owns other TV channels, such as Inooro TV( kikuyu -language ) and Ramogi TV (luo-language). Citizen TV is available on multiple platforms, including DStv, GOtv, Zuku, StarTimes, Azam TV, and digital terrestrial television (DTT) networks.

== News and programs ==
Citizen TV airs a diverse range of local and international entertainment programs. They include soap operas, along with local content and news. It employs Kenyan presenters, such as Azeezah Hashim.

== History ==
On 22 July 2018, Citizen TV unveiled their new television studio and news anchors. These included Lulu Hassan and Rashid Abdalla. The station also launched an affiliate Ramogi TV in 2021.

=== Radio stations ===
Royal Media Services, Citizen TV's parent company, operates a wide network of radio stations across Kenya. These stations serve both national and regional audiences, broadcasting in English, Kiswahili, and various indigenous languages.

== Awards ==
- Communications Authority KUZA Awards, 2021
- Couture Africa Style Awards, 2021
- Kituo Halisi Award in 2020
