= Njugush =

Kenyan comedian and actor (born 1991)

Timothy Ndegwa OGW
- Born: Timothy Ndegwa Kimani; May 20, 1991 (age 35); Meru County, Kenya
- Education: Kenya Institute of Mass Communication
- Notable work: Through Thick and Thin (TTNT)
- Spouse: Separated
- Children: 2

Comedy career
- Years active: 2012–present
- Genres: Observational comedy, Satire, Physical Comedy, Improvisational Comedy, Digital and Sketch Comedy

Timothy Ndegwa Kimani OGW (born May 20, 1991), known professionally as Njugush, is a Kenyan comedian, actor, and content creator. His comedic work, which often explores everyday Kenyan life and societal issues, has earned him numerous accolades, including the 2020 Africa Digital Influencer of the Year award and in December 2023, he received the Order of the Grand Warrior (OGW), a presidential award in Kenya.

== Early life and education ==
Njugush was born on May 20, 1991, in Meru County, Kenya. His father is a clergyman and his mother is a businesswoman. He attended Naaro High School, where he achieved a C+ in the Kenya Certificate of Secondary Education (KCSE) examinations. He later pursued a degree in journalism at the Kenya Institute of Mass Communication. During his time at the institute, Njugush developed an interest in acting and comedy, participating in various drama and theater productions. He has one younger brother.

== Career ==
=== Television and comedy ===
Njugush's career began with a role in the television comedy show "Hapa Kule News," a satirical news program that aired on KTN. He was cast in the show by producer Abel Mutua. Njugush gained further recognition for his role as Njuguna in the television comedy series The Real Househelps of Kawangware (TRHK). The series, which aired on KTN, YouTube, NTV and Maisha Magic East, featured Njuguna as a witty and humorous character reflecting aspects of urban life in Nairobi. This role significantly contributed to Njugush's growing popularity in Kenya.

=== Digital content creation ===
In 2016, Njugush left The Real Househelps of Kawangware and transitioned to digital platforms, creating and sharing comedic skits on YouTube and social media. Njugush's comedic sketches often satirize everyday situations, resonating with viewers through relatable humor.

Njugush frequently collaborates with his wife, Celestine Ndinda, in creating comedic content.

Beyond entertainment, Njugush utilizes his platform to address social issues. Through satire and parody, he comments on topics like governance, societal norms and everyday challenges faced by Kenyans.

=== Tours and recognition ===
In 2019, Njugush and his wife, Celestine Ndinda, launched "Through Thick and Thin" (TTNT), a live comedy show. TTNT has been performed domestically in Kenya and in various locations internationally, including the United Kingdom and Australia.

These international performances contributed to Njugush's growing recognition beyond Kenya, allowing him to engage with the Kenyan diaspora and introduce his comedy to a broader audience.

His international recognition was further solidified in 2020 when he received the Africa Digital Influencer of the Year award at the Africa Digital Awards, highlighting his impact on digital platforms across the continent.

== Personal life ==
Njugush is married to Celestine Ndinda. The couple met while studying at the Kenya Institute of Mass Communication and married in 2012. They have two sons.

== Advocacy and social issues ==
Njugush has used his platform to address various social issues, including youth unemployment, domestic violence, and cyberbullying. In 2023, he publicly addressed the issue of youth unemployment in Kenya, highlighting its significance. He has also used his platform to raise awareness about domestic violence, collaborating with his wife, Celestine Ndinda, to create content that emphasizes the importance of healthy relationships. Furthermore, Njugush has openly discussed his own experiences with cyberbullying and encouraged individuals to develop resilience against online harassment.

While Njugush has ruled out a career in politics, he believes he can effectively address societal issues through his comedic work. He emphasizes that his skits allow him to reach a broad audience and promote positive social change.
