= Catherine Kamau =

Kenyan actress (born 1987)

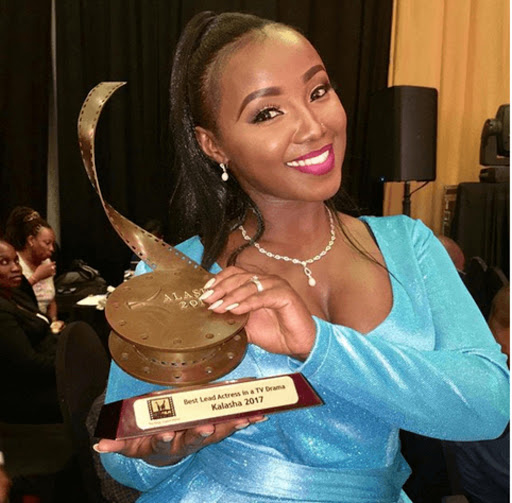
- Born: Catherine Njoki Kamau; 3 February 1987 (age 39); Nyahururu, Kenya
- Other names: Celina; Kate Actress
- Education: Multimedia University of Kenya
- Occupation: Actress
- Years active: 2008–present
- Known for: Sue Na Jonnie (2017); Disconnect (2018); Plan B (2019)
- Notable work: Mother-in-Law
- Spouse: Philip Karanja (m. 2017; div. 2023)
- Children: 2

Catherine Njoki Kamau (born 3 February 1987) is a Kenyan actress also known as Kate Actress. She gained national recognition for her portrayal of Celina (also spelled Selina) in the Citizen TV drama Mother in‑Law, joining the cast in 2006 as a dancer and receptionist before becoming Charlie's wife and Olive's stepmother.

== Early life ==
Kamau was born on 3 February 1987 in Nyahururu, Kenya.

She attended Chogoria High School where she joined the drama club and was recognised for her talent, before moving to Loreto Convent Msongari, where she won the Miss Loreto Award.

Kamau holds a diploma in communications with a major in public relations from Kenya College of Communication and Technology, which later became MultiMedia University of Kenya.

== Career ==
Kamau portrayed Celina, the wife of Charlie (played by Patrick Oketch) in the Citizen TV drama series Mother-in-Law, which began airing in 2006. She later left the show to star as Sue in the Swahili language TV series Sue Na Jonnie.

Kamau won the Best Lead Actress in the TV Drama Series category at the 2017 Kalasha Awards and received another nomination for Best Actress in a TV Drama in 2018, for her role in Sue Na Jonnie. In the same year, she was nominated in the Best Supporting Actress in a Film category of the Kenya Film Commission Kalasha Awards for her role in the film Disconnect.

She played Joyce in the 2019 romantic comedy film, Plan B, produced by Sarah Hassan and directed by Dolapo Adeleke (Lowladee). She received another nomination for the Best Supporting Actress in Film category at the 2019 Kenya Film Commission Kalasha Awards for the role.

Kamau has also featured in films including Nafsi and A Grand Little Lie, produced by Phil-It Productions. A Grand Little Lie premiered in October 2021 before being released on Netflix.

She is also a digital content creator. On her YouTube channel, she speaks on fashion, lifestyle, acting and motherhood. She is passionate on the issue of teenage pregnancies. Having become a mother as a teenager, she has spoken publicly about teenage pregnancy and encourages young women to delay motherhood through her "Queens must wait" campaign.

Kamau has served as a brand ambassador for Harpic Kenya and Nice and Lovely Petroleum Jelly.

In May 2024, she visited the United States as part of President William Ruto's entourage during the state visit. Her invitation, as a representative of the Kenyan creative industry, came from the former United States ambassador to Kenya, Meg Whitman.

During Kenya's Jamhuri Day celebrations in December 2024, Kamau was awarded the Order of The Grand Warrior (OGW) Presidential Award in recognition of her contributions to the film industry.

== Personal life ==
Kamau was married to film director and former Tahidi High actor Philip Karanja from 17 November 2017 until they announced their divorce on 19 September 2023.

While in Kampala International University in Uganda, she gave birth to her first son, Leon, in 2006 at the age of 19. He was later adopted by Karanja. In December 2019, the couple had their first child together, Karla Njeri.

== Filmography ==
Year	Title	Role	Notes
2008–date	Mother-in-Law	Selina (Celina)	TV series
2017–2019	Sue Na Jonnie	Sue	TV series
2018	Disconnect	TK	Netflix film
2019	Plan B	Joyce	Netflix film
2021	Nafsi	Shiko	Netflix film
2021	A Grand Little Lie	The Boss	Film
2014	Love Ransom		Film
2016	Brother Jekwu	Lauren	Film
2021	Kutu	Ruth	Short film
2022	Click Click Bang	Mama Mboga	Film
2022	Disconnect: The wedding Planner	TK	Film

== Awards and nominations ==
Year	Award	Category	Show	Result	Ref
2019	Kalasha International Film and TV Awards	Best Supporting Actress Film	Plan B	Nominated	
2017	Kalasha International Film and TV Awards	Best Actress in a TV Drama	Sue Na Jonnie	Won	
2018	Kalasha International Film and TV Awards	Best Supporting Actress Film	Disconnect	Nominated	
2021	Kalasha International Film and TV Awards	Best Supporting Actress Film	Kutu	Won	
