= Beatrice Waithera Maina =

Kenyan journalist and Human Rights Activist

- Citizenship: Kenya
- Education: Multimedia university of Kenya
- Occupation: Journalist

Beatrice Waithera Maina is a Kenyan journalist and human advocate who participates in street demonstrations to fight for human rights She has also participated in protests about corrupt leaders in Kenya. In 2019 she was named a heroine by one of the Kenyan political leaders for leading demonstration to end corruption in public institutions in the country. The country was marking Labour Day that was held at Uhuru Park, the Kenya's recreational park known for historic events in the country's capital city. She is also known as Waithera Wanjiru and operates through a group of women called Grassroots Women Initiative Network-Kenya to condemn sexual gender based violence.

== Career ==
In 2019 she was arrested and detained at Central Police Station in Nairobi. She was later on released after other activists demanded so. In May 2020, she was again arrested by police officers and taken at Soweto Police Station in Nairobi after she led other protesters over water rationing during COVID-19 pandemic in the area.

== Education ==
She studied Broadcast Journalism and holds Bachelor’s Degree from the Multimedia University of Kenya.
