= Catholic University of Eastern Africa =

Private university in Kenya

- Former name: Catholic Higher Institute of Eastern Africa (1984-1992)
- Motto: "Consecrate them in the truth"
- Type: Private
- Established: 1984; 42 years ago
- Religious affiliation: Catholic
- Chancellor: Most Rev. Gervas John Mwasikwabhila Nyaisonga
- Vice-Chancellor: Rev. Prof Elias Opongo
- Undergraduates: ~9,000 (2024)
- Postgraduates: ~2,000 (2020)
- Location: Nairobi, Kenya; 01°21′04″S 36°45′28″E
- Campus: Bogani East Road, Langata
- Website: www.cuea.edu

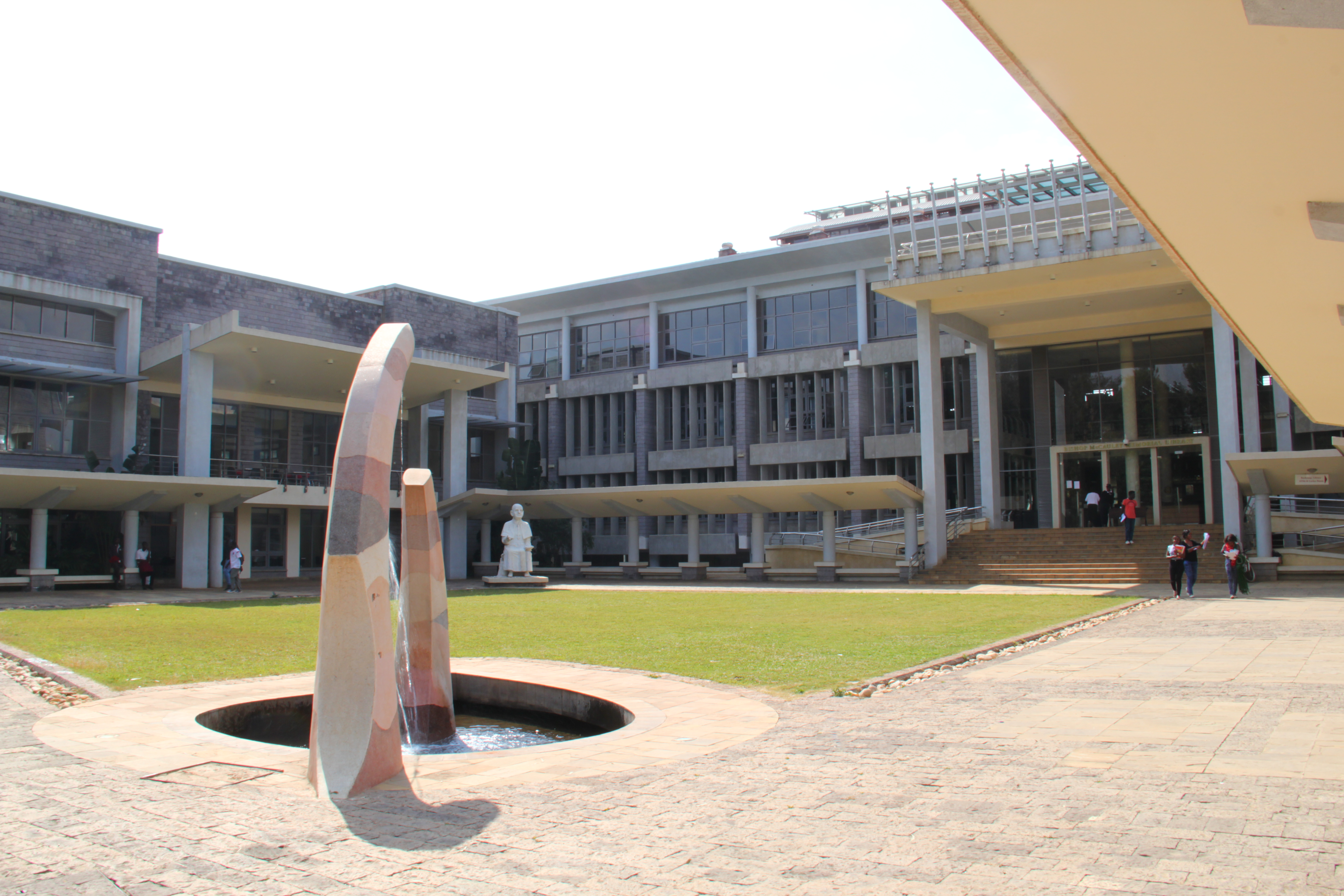
Main building

Catholic University of Eastern Africa (CUEA), is a multi-campus private university in Kenya. It is accredited by the Commission for University Education in Kenya.

== Location ==
The main campus of the university is located along Bogani East Road, in the neighborhood of Langata, in southwest Nairobi, the capital and largest city of Kenya. The geographical coordinates of the university campus are: 1°21'04.0"S, 36°45'28.0"E (Latitude: -1.351111; Longitude:36.757778).

== History ==
Catholic University of Eastern Africa was founded on 3 September 1984 as a graduate school of theology, under the name Catholic Higher Institute of Eastern Africa (CHIEA). The institute was founded by the regional ecclesiastical authority known as Association of Member Episcopal Conferences of Eastern Africa (AMECEA).

The institution was formally opened by Pope John Paul II on 18 August 1985. In 1986 the Graduate School of Theology started negotiations with the Commission for Higher Education in Kenya to establish the current University.

In 1989, the institute obtained a "Letter of Interim Authority" as the first step towards its establishment as a private university. After three years of intensive negotiations between the Authority of the Graduate School of Theology (CHIEA) and the Commission for Higher Education, the Faculty of Arts and Social Sciences was established. The Civil Charter was granted to CHIEA on 3 November 1992; this marked the birth of the private university. The institute rebranded in 1992 as the Catholic University of Eastern Africa.

In 2002, the Faculties of Science and Commerce were established, followed by the Center for Social Justice and Ethics in 2003, the Faculty of Law in 2004, and the School of Continuing Professional Development in 2009. Satellite campuses were opened in Eldoret and Kisumu in the same year.

In April 2013, the university opened a new campus in I&M Tower, along Kenyatta Avenue, in Nairobi's central business district. The campus can accommodate up to 500 students and serves people working downtown.

== Learning Resource Centre ==
The university's Learning Resource Centre (LRC) is an example of ecologically sustainable design in the region. Designed by Kenyan architect Musau Kimeu, the LRC consists of three buildings—a 3000-seat modern library, a 1200-seat state-of-the-art auditorium, and a 500-seat cafeteria. The buildings are arranged around a 50m by 40m central square and tied together by a covered walkway with outdoor seating. The central area of the grass-covered square is adorned on opposite corners with a fountain and a three-metre high statue of Pope Paul VI by Ugandan artist Leonard Kateete.

The three buildings are designed to include the use of natural ventilation to provide cooling, maximize a high thermal mass, use sun-shading of glazed areas, and building orientation to maximize sustainability. Wind energy is utilized to operate the ventilation cowls above the thermal chimneys. The underground water storage tank has a top that doubles as the podium for an outdoor amphitheatre. The tank is being incorporated for water harvesting. In 2014, the library building was recognized as the Best Green Building in Kenya.

== Academics ==
As of December 2025, the university maintains the following faculties, schools, centres and institutes:

- Faculty of Arts and Social Sciences
- Faculty of Education
- Faculty of Law
- Faculty of Science
- Faculty of Theology
- School of Business and Economics
- School of Nursing
- School of Graduate Studies
- Institute of Canon Law
- Institute of Regional Integration and Development (IRID)
- Centre for Social Justice and Ethics (CSJE)
- African Centre of Excellence in Theology and Canon Law (ACETCL)
- Library and Information Science
- Open Distance and e-Learning (ODEL)

Nearly all the faculties, schools and institutes are found in various halls within the university. The exception is the Faculty of Law, which is separately based at Kozlowiecki Hall outside the main campus grounds.

== Student Life ==
The Catholic University of Eastern Africa begins its academic year in August or September with the Convocation Mass, which formally welcomes new students. The University hosts a variety of student clubs, associations and movements open to all students. Recruitment generally takes place during induction, though students may join within the first month of the semester. Notable organizations include AIESEC and the Kenya Model United Nations, alongside faculty-specific clubs.

Student representation is coordinated through the Catholic University of Eastern Africa Students' Organisation (CUEASO), which holds an annual General Assembly. The Students Governing Convention meets monthly, while the Executive maintains regular meetings with the Dean of Students to manage student affairs.

The University supports several sports clubs, including Catholic Monks RFC, which competes in the nationwide rugby league and has won tournaments such as the Prinsloo 7s and the National League, and Catholic Saints Football Club, the University's football team. An annual Cultural Week is held, concluding with the selection of Mr. and Miss CUEA.

Graduation ceremonies at the University typically take place annually in October. The University also promotes innovation and entrepreneurship through iHub CUEA, an innovation hub that works with GDG CUEA, a community of developers drawn from the student body focused on Google technologies such as Android and Google Cloud.

== Cardinal Otunga Scholarship Fund ==
The university runs the Cardinal Otunga Scholarship Fund in honour of one of the university's founding fathers, Maurice Cardinal Michael Otunga. The aim of the fund is to sponsor needy but deserving students in pursuit of their studies at the university. The scholarship fund governance framework consists of two committees, namely the Fund Steering Committee and the Scholarship Awards Committee. The Steering Committee organizes an annual Cardinal Otunga Memorial Mass, the Lecture and the Scholarship Fundraiser whereas the Awards Committee administers the funds to deserving students.

== Constituent and affiliated colleges ==
- Marist International University College
- Tangaza University College (until 2 May 2024)
- Hekima University College
- Regina Pacis University College
- Uzima University College

In addition to constituent colleges there are a number of affiliated colleges namely;

- Don Bosco College: Moshi, Tanzania
- Christ the King Major Seminary
- The Spiritan Seminary
- AMECEA Pastoral Institute
- Chemichemi ya Uzima Center

== Notable alumni ==
Notable alumni include:

- Faith Odhiambo, 51st President of the Law Society of Kenya
- Justin Nsengiyumva, Prime Minister of Rwanda
- Stella Kilonzo, former executive director of the Capital Markets Authority of Kenya
- Geoffrey Kiringa Ruku, Cabinet Secretary for Public Service, Human Capital and Special Programmes, Kenya
- Susan Murabana, Kenyan astronomer
- Eve D'Souza, Media personality
- Teresa Wacera Kìragū, Roman Catholic sister, theologian, and academic
- George Khaniri, Senator, Vihiga County
- Vanessa Mdee, Tanzanian singer
- Rachel Ruto, First Lady of the Republic of Kenya
- Henry Yeboah Yiadom-Boachie, Ghanaian politician
- Amos Mabuti Masemola, Bishop of the Roman Catholic Diocese of Kroonstad, South Africa
- Jackson Mandago, Senator of Uasin Gishu County
- Elizabeth Lenjo, Intellectual Property Lawyer and Lecturer
- Awut Deng Acuil, Former Minister of Foreign Affairs and International Cooperation, South Sudan
- Samantha Mugatsia, Kenyan actress
- Uwem Akpan, Nigerian writer
- Anisia Achieng, South Sudanese Member of Parliament and women's rights activist
- Margaret Mwachanya, Commissioner, Independent Electoral and Boundaries Commission of Kenya
- Betty Korir, Kenyan Lawyer and Corporate Executive, Credit Bank
- Doreen Majala, Kenyan Lawyer and media personality
- Camille Storm, Kenyan music executive
- Tuta Mionki, Kenyan rally driver, co-driver and navigator
- John Baptist Odama, Catholic Archbishop Emeritus of Gulu, Uganda
- Raphael p'Mony Wokorach, Catholic Archbishop of the Roman Catholic Archdiocese of Gulu, Uganda
- Vincent Frederick Mwakhwawa, Auxiliary Bishop of the Roman Catholic Archdiocese of Lilongwe, Malawi
- QueenArrow, Kenyan esports player
- Reuben Kiborek, Member of Parliament for Mogotio Constituency, Kenya
- Margaret Ogola, Kenyan author and paediatrician
- Motlatsi Meshack Phomane, South African Catholic Prelate
- Blessing Lung'aho, Kenyan actor and content creator
- Emery Kibal Nkufi Mansong'loo, Congolese Catholic Prelate

== See also ==
- Education in Kenya
- List of universities in Kenya
