= Connie Maina =

Kenyan businesswoman

- Born: 1970 (age 55–56); Meru, Meru County, Kenya
- Citizenship: Kenya
- Education: London Chamber of Commerce and Industry (Diploma in Public Relations) (Diploma in Business Studies); University of Melbourne (Master of Business Administration); University of Stirling (Master of Science in Public Relations)
- Occupation: Businesswoman
- Years active: 1996 — present
- Known for: Business acumen, Administrative skills
- Title: former Vice Chairperson of the Independent Electoral and Boundaries Commission of Kenya

Consolata Nkatha Bucha Maina, (née Consolata Nkatha), but commonly referred to as Connie Maina, is a Kenyan businesswoman, who served as the Vice Chairperson of the Independent Electoral and Boundaries Commission (IEBC) of Kenya, effective 22 January 2018.

== Background and education ==
Maina was born in 1970, in the town of Meru, in Meru County, in the central part of Kenya. She attended elementary and secondary schools in Meru County and in Nairobi County.

She also holds a Master of Business Administration degree, awarded by the University of Melbourne in Melbourne, Australia. Her second master's degree is the Master of Science degree in Public relations, was obtained from the University of Stirling, in Scotland.

== Work experience ==
She worked in the Melbourne area, in Australia for several years, before returning to Kenya in 2016. When a new Commission of the Independent Electoral and Boundaries Commission was constituted in January 2017, she was named the deputy chairperson of the seven-person body.

== Resignation and return to IEBC ==
On 16 April 2018, Connie Maina, Margaret Mwachanya and Dr Paul Kibiwott Kurgat, held a press conference and announced their immediate resignation from the Independent Electoral and Boundaries Commission, "because they have (had) no faith in chairman Wafula Chebukati and his leadership".

On 24 August 2018, Connie Maina and Margaret Mwachanya returned to the IEBC headquarters and verbally rescinded their resignations.

As of September 2018, a lawsuit was winding its way through the Kenya court system to allow the three commissioners access to their commission offices.

== See also ==
- Margaret Mwachanya
- Roslyne Akombe
