= Margaret Mwachanya =

Kenyan educator

- Born: 1970 (age 55–56); Kwale County, Kenya
- Citizenship: Kenya
- Education: Catholic University of Eastern Africa (Bachelor of Arts in Swahili); University of Nairobi (Master of Arts in Swahili)
- Occupation: Educator
- Title: Commissioner of the Independent Electoral and Boundaries Commission (IEBC) of Kenya

Margaret Wanjala Mwachanya (née Margaret Wanjala, commonly referred to as Margaret Mwachanya, is a Kenyaneducator, who, since January 2017, serves as a commissioner of the Independent Electoral and Boundaries Commission (IEBC) of Kenya.

== Background and education ==
She was born in 1970, in Kwale County, on the Kenyan Indian Ocean coast. She attended schools in Kenya and Israel.

Margaret Mwachanya holds a Bachelor of Arts degree in the Swahili language, obtained from the Catholic University of Eastern Africa. Her Master of Arts in Kiswahili, was awarded by the University of Nairobi.

== Work experience ==
Ms Mwachanya is a veteran educator who has taught Kiswahili in various schools around the country. Prior to her present assignment, she served on the public service board of Taita-Taveta County.

== Resignation and return to IEBC ==
On 16 April 2018, Margaret Mwachanya, the IEBC Vice Chair Connie Maina, and Dr Paul Kibiwott Kurgat, held a press conference and announced their immediate resignation from the Independent Electoral and Boundaries Commission, "because they have (had) no faith in chairman Wafula Chebukati and his leadership".

On 24 August 2018, Margaret Mwachanya and Connie Maina returned to the IEBC headquarters and verbally rescinded their resignations.

As of September 2018, a lawsuit was winding its way through the Kenya court system to allow the three commissioners access to their commission offices.

== See also ==
- Connie Maina
- Roslyne Akombe
