= Disconnect (2018 film) =

2018 film directed by David Gitonga and Michael Jones

- Directed by: David "Tosh" Gitonga and Michael Jones
- Written by: Silas Miami
- Produced by: Njeri Karago
- Starring: Brenda Wairimu, Nick Mutuma, Catherine Kamau, Pascal Tokodi and Pierra Makena
- Cinematography: Andrew Mageto
- Edited by: Franki Ashiruka
- Music by: Ibrahim Sidede and Alex Tharao
- Release date: 21 April 2018
- Running time: 107 minutes
- Country: Kenya
- Languages: Swahili; English

Disconnect is a 2018 Kenyan romantic comedy film directed by David "Tosh" Gitonga and Michael Jones. The film explores the dating scene in Nairobi and stars Brenda Wairimu and Nick Mutuma, who lead a diverse cast.

The film aired on Netflix on 16 October 2020 making it one of the top Kenyan films to feature on the on-demand video platform, after the premieres of Poacher and Sincerely Daisy.

== Plot ==
The film revolves around a secret romantic attraction between two best friends, Celine and Josh, and their closest friends in the Kenyan capital. Celine has difficulty getting into the right kind of relationship and often relies on the advice and emotional support of her friends, including TK, the crazy one; Judy, the prayer warrior; Robin, Celine's sister; and Preeti, her co-worker and the fun one. Josh also relies on his friends, Otis and Jennings, who help him navigate the urban relationship jungle.

== Cast ==
- Brenda Wairimu as Celine
- Nick Mutuma as Josh
- Catherine Kamau as TK
- Pascal Tokodi as Otis
- Bridget Shighadi as Neema
- Pierra Makena as Robin
- Patricia Kihoro as Judy
- Justin Mirichii as Khalid
- Aseem Sharma as Preeti
- Arthur Sanya Muiruri as Jennings (as Arthur Sanya)
- Brian Ogola as Richard
- Illya Frank as Belinda
- Isaya Evans as Kenneth
- Jazz Mistri as Ciru
- Willy Mwangi as Jacob
- Samwel Njihia as Celine's grandfather
- Jerry Mokua as Belinda's driver
- Keith Chuaga as Andrew
- Zainabu Harri as Mrs. Njuguna (as Zainabu Hari)
- Joyce Maina as Samantha
- Joe Miano as period date guy
- Muthoni Gatheca as Ma. Anzeste
- May Wairimu as Celine's mum
- Maqbul Mohammed as Patrick (as Makbul Mohammed)
- Stanley Mburu as Gatheca
- Hellen Njoki as Betty
- Yvonne Wambui as nurse
- Runjugi Ian Andrew as reporter
- Humphrey Maina as Kamotho Junior
- Winnie Wangui as Mrs. Mbuthia
- Shiviske Shivisi as Ashley
- Vera Atsang as Neema's assistant
- Esther Mueni as waitress

== Release ==
The film was released on 21 April 2018.
