= Catherine Kariuki Mulika =

Kenyan lawyer

- Born: 1985 (age 40–41); Kenya
- Citizenship: Kenya
- Education: University of Nairobi; Kenya School of Law; Strathmore University
- Occupations: Lawyer; Corporate Executive
- Years active: 2010–present
- Known for: Intellectual Property; Telecommunications, Media and Technology
- Title: Partner at TripleOKLaw Advocates LLP, Nairobi, Kenya

Catherine Kariuki Mulika (née Catherine Kariuki), (born c. 1985), is a Kenyan lawyer, who is a Partner at the law firm of TripleOKLaw Advocates LLP, based in Nairobi, Kenya's capital and largest city. She specializes in Intellectual Property, Telecommunications, Media and Technology.

== Background and education ==
Catherine Kariuki Mulika was born in Kenya, circa 1985. After attending local primary and secondary schools, she was admitted to the University of Nairobi, graduating in 2008, with a Bachelor of Laws degree. After attending the Advocates Training Program at the Kenya School of Law, she was admitted to the Kenyan Bar.

She also holds a Certified Public Accountant Certificate II (Section IV), obtained from Strathmore University, in Nairobi. As of 2018, she was pursuing a Master of Business Administration at the University of Nairobi.

== Career ==
Mulika is a corporate lawyer, advocate of the High Court of Kenya and an expert in the areas of intellectual property law, technology law, media law, and telecommunications law. She is the head of the Telecommunications, Media and Technology Division (TMT Division), at TripleOKlaw Advocates LLP, effective January 2018.

According to the website of the company, TripleOKlaw Advocates LLP had 39 lawyers as of 2018. Of these, nine were Partners, 20 were Associate Attorneys and 10 were Trainee Lawyers. Of the nine Partners, only two were women, one of whom is Catherine Kariuki Mulika.

She joined the firm in January 2010, as a Senior Associate in the Banking, Finance & Real Estate Division. In January 2018, she was transferred to the Telecommunications, Media and Technology Division and was appointed Team Leader there. In July of that same year, she made Partner at the company.

== Other considerations ==
In September 2018, Business Daily Africa, a Kenyan English-language daily newspaper, named Catherine Kariuki Mulika among the "Top 40 Under 40 Women in Kenya in 2018".

== See also ==
- Emma Miloyo
- Elizabeth Lenjo
