= Philip Karanja =

Kenyan director, producer and actor (born 1987)

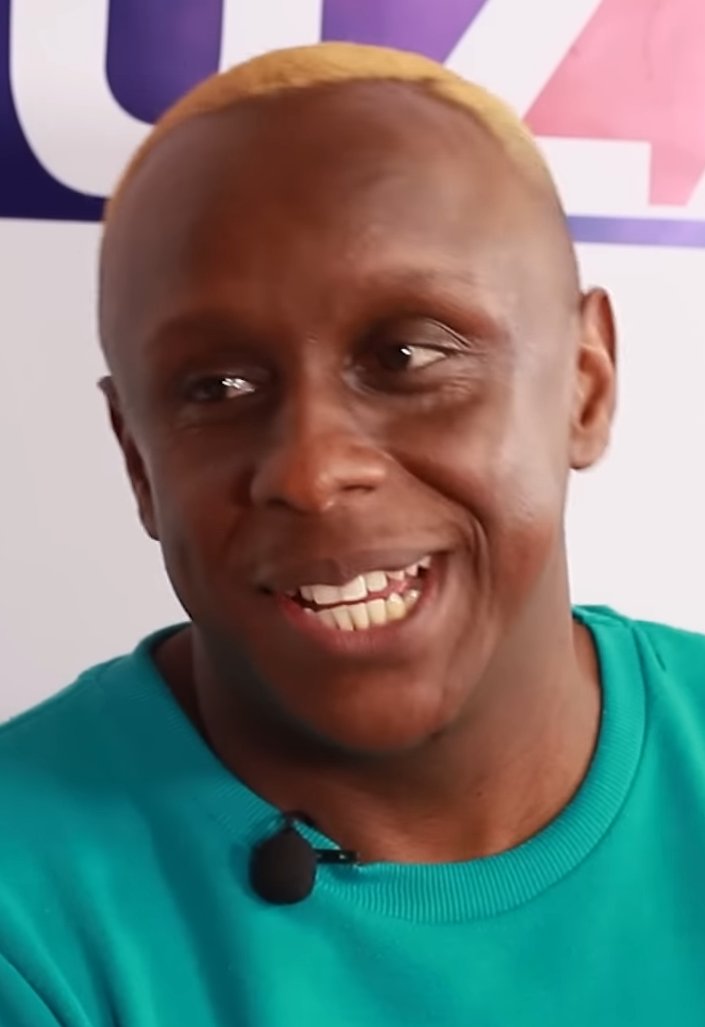
- Karanja in 2022
- Born: Philip Karanja Njenga; 22 February 1987 (age 39); Nairobi, Kenya
- Other name: Director Phil
- Occupations: Directors; Actor; Producer
- Years active: 2007–present
- Known for: Tahidi High (2007)
- Notable work: Sue Na Jonnie (2017)
- Spouse: Catherine Kamau (m. 2017)
- Children: 2
- Website: www.philittv.com

Philip Karanja (born February 22, 1987) is a Kenyan director, producer and actor best known for his role as Melvin in the Citizen TV drama series Tahidi High in 2007. He is the co-founder and chief executive officer of Phill-It Productions, a film and television production company he established in 2012 with his creative partner Abel Mutua. Karanja began his directing career in 2014 with the KTN comedy series, The Real Househelps of Kawangware. He has since directed projects including Sue and Jonnie, A Grand Little Lie, Click Click Bang, Makosa ni Yangu and Untying Kantai. As an actor, he has also appeared on Tahidi High, Aphrodite and Haki Mwitu.

== Early life ==
Karanja was born on February 22, 1987 in Nairobi, Kenya as the second-born and only son in a family of five. He was raised in Dandora. Both of his parents were teachers, and his father died in 2002 while Karanja was in high school.

=== Education ===
He began his primary education at Tom Mboya Primary School in Dandora before transferring to Hospital Hill Primary School in Parklands. He later attended Dagoretti High School in Nairobi for his secondary studies. Karanja then studied film production and acting at the Kenya Institute of Mass Communication, where he graduated in 2008.

== Career ==
While still a film student in 2007, Karanja was cast in the Citizen TV series Tahidi High as Melvin. Within a year, he was promoted to production assistant and later to assistant director. He also worked as an assistant director on Mother-in-Law series on Citizen TV.

In 2011, he was cast as Mike in a short film Aphrodite. As a director with Protel Studios in 2014, his first projects were the television series Hapa Kule News and The Real Househelps of Kawangware on KTN. He directed 104 episodes of the latter before leaving to focus on Phill-It Productions. in 2017, he directed Maisha Magic Plus comedy series Hullabaloo Estate.

His next project as a director was Sue na Jonnie on Maisha Magic East and Showmax. It was the first production from Phil-It productions to be broadcaster by a mainstream channel. In 2021, he directed the feature film A Grand Little Lie and later the action film Click Click Bang.

Karanja returned to acting in 2024 as Mr. X in the television series Haki Mwitu, before resuming his role as director on the same show. He also directed Untying Kantai and worked as a producer on both Haki Mwitu and A Grand Little Lie.

== Personal life ==
Karanja met Catherine Kamau at the set of Mother-in-Law in 2012 and they began dating in 2013. They got married in 2017 in Nairobi. Karanja adopted Kamau's son, Leon Karanja and in December 2019 the couple welcomed a daughter, Karla Njeri.

On September 19, 2023, they both announced their divorce with a joint statement on their social media accounts.

== Filmography ==
Year	Title	Role	Notes
2007–2014	Tahidi High	Melvin	Cast, production assistant, assistant director
2008–2014	Mother-in-Law		Assistant director
2011	Aphrodite	Mike	Cast
2014–2016	Hapa Kule News		Director
2014–2016	The Real Househelps of Kawangware		Director
2017	Hullabaloo Estate		Director
2017	Sue na Jonnie		Director
2021	A Grand Little Lie		Director, executive producer
2022	Click Click Bang		Director
2024	Haki Mwitu	Mr. X	Cast, executive producer
2024	Untying Kantai		Director

== Awards and nominations ==
Year	Award	Category	Show	Result	Ref
2017	Kalasha International Film and TV Awards	Best TV Drama	Sue Na Jonnie	Won	
2022	Kalasha International Film and TV Awards	Best Picture	Click Click Bang	Won	
2023	Africa magic Viewers' Choice Awards	Best Movie East Africa	Click Click Bang	Won	
2023	Africa magic Viewers' Choice Awards	Best Indigenous Language - Swahili	Click Click Bang	Won	
