= Njeri =

Njeri is a name in the Kikuyu language of Kenya. It can be a surname or a Kenyan feminine given name. Notable people with the name include:

== Given name ==
- Njeri Karago (1960–2022), Kenyan film producer
- Njeri Rionge (1966–2023), Kenyan technology entrepreneur
- Njeri Waithaka, Kenyan lawyer

== Middle name ==
- Pauline Njeri Kahenya (born 1985), Kenyan long-distance runner

== Surname ==
- Akua Njeri, American writer and activist
- Itabari Njeri (21st century), American journalist
- Rose Njeri, Kenyan software developer
