= Daniel Tuitoek =

Kenyan politician

Member of Parliament for Mogotio Constituency
- In office 2017–2022
- Succeeded by: Reuben Kiborek

Personal details
- Party: Jubilee Alliance
- Website: www.parliament.go.ke/the-national-assembly/hon-tuitoek-daniel-kamuren

Daniel Kamuren Tuitoek is Kenyan politician who served as the Member of Parliament for Mogotio Constituency in Baringo County from 2017 to 2022.
