= Tuta Mionki =

Kenyan rally driver

Tuta Mionki (born 21 April 1976) is a Kenyan rally driver, co-driver and navigator who was crowned the Kenya Motor Sports Personality of the year 2018. She also holds the Kenya Motor Sports Federation Awards for the best co-driver of the season 2015 (Division 3) and 2016 (2-wheel-drive). Mionki was the first woman rally driver to join the Kenya National Rally Championship (KNRC) Premier Class Motor Rallying. She has a nephew called Christian Mwendwa.

== Background and education ==
Mionki was born to Jane Nyaruiru (Wambui) Mionki. She grew up in Thika and attended Gatumaini primary school and Maryhill Girls High School. Mionki later studied at the Catholic University of Eastern Africa and completed her Masters at the University of Nairobi where she majored in human resource management.

Mionki also attended the Abdul Sidi Rally Academy (ASRA).

== Career ==
Mionki as a human resources professional, had previously worked for corporations such as Kenya Airways, British American Tobacco, Java House and ZTE. She then left her job in 2009 to start her own business.

In 2012, she joined racing as a navigator for rally driver Eric Bengi in the Rally Raid. She has since been a co-driver for Victor Okundi, Steve Gacheru, Helen Shiri, Murage Waigwa and Nzioka Waita. She has participated in the 2021 Safari Rally as a co-driver for Nzioka Waita.

== Awards ==
In 2016, she won the award for Best Co-Driver (in the 2 wheel drive category). In 2018, Mionki was crowned the Kenya Motorsports Personality of the Year, making her the second woman to be given the award after Anne Teith.

== See also ==
- Kenya National Rally Championship circuit
- Nzioka Waita
- Orie Rogo Manduli
