= Mbeki Mwalimu =

Kenyan actress

- Born: Mbeki Mwalimu; March 13, 1984 (age 42); Machakos, Kenya
- Occupations: Actress; Producer; Director; Television presenter
- Years active: 2004- till present
- Organization: The Mbeki Mwalimu Initiative
- Known for: Sincerely Daisy; Selina; kina
- Television: Good Morning Kenya; The Ultimate Choir

Mbeki Mwalimu (born 13 March 1984) is a Kenyan actress, producer and director with experience in theater and television. She began her career in Kenya's theatre scene in 2004 at Mbalamwezi Players before joining the Festival Of Creative Arts (FCA) in 2007 and has since become a household name as a stage and screen actor, production manager, stage director and producer.

She is famed for stage plays within FCA and for her role as Zoe Mackenzie in the 2018 Swahili telenovela Selina on Maisha Magic and has also been featured in the film Sincerely Daisy, which premiered on Netflix on October 9, 2020.

== Early life and education ==
Mbeki Mwalimu was born and raised in Machakos, Kenya. She developed an early interest in performing arts during her school years, where she actively participated in drama festivals and stage productions. Her involvement in school theater competitions helped shape her foundational skills in acting and storytelling. After completing her secondary education, she relocated to Nairobi to pursue a professional career in acting, joining community theater groups and gradually establishing herself within Kenya's performing arts scene.

== Career ==
=== Theatre ===
Mwalimu began her professional theater career in 2004 with the Mbalamwezi Players, one of Kenya’s long-standing theater groups. In 2007, she joined the Festival of Creative Arts (FCA), where she worked for nearly a decade as an actress, production manager and, later, a director under the mentorship of Caroline Odongo.

During her tenure at FCA, she gained experience in both classical and contemporary theater productions, contributing to the growth of Kenya’s live performance industry. Her work emphasized storytelling rooted in African contexts, often focusing on social themes and everyday experiences.

In 2016, Mwalimu left FCA to focus on developing original Kenyan productions. In 2018, she founded the theatre company Back to Basics (B2B), aimed at producing locally relevant narratives and nurturing emerging talent. The company’s debut production, Strangers by Blood, which she co-authored with Justin Mirichii, received critical acclaim.

Through B2B, she also adapted works by Kenyan writer Jackson Biko (Biko Zulu), including the stage production Impervious. Her work earned her the Best Theatre Director award at the 2018 Sanaa Theatre Awards.

Her theater productions are noted for their emphasis on minimalistic staging, character-driven narratives and contemporary Kenyan themes.

=== Television and film ===
Mwalimu transitioned into mainstream media through her work as a television presenter at the Kenya Broadcasting Corporation, where she hosted Good Morning Kenya and The Ultimate Choir.

She gained national recognition for her portrayal of Zoe Mackenzie in the Maisha Magic East telenovela Selina (2018–2022), where she played a complex antagonist. In addition to acting, she contributed as a director on the series, marking her transition into behind-the-scenes production roles. She founded her theater outfit Back to Basics in 2018, with the aim of growing the theater life in Kenya.

In 2020, she appeared in the film Sincerely Daisy, portraying the character Wendy. The film was notable for being among the first Kenyan productions to gain global distribution on Netflix. Her performance earned her a nomination for Best Supporting Actress at the Kalasha Awards.

She later appeared in the 2022 short film Baba, directed by Mbithi Masya, which premiered internationally at the 47th Toronto International Film Festival (TIFF).

In 2023, she joined the Maisha Magic Plus drama series Kina, taking over the role of Nana Mandi Tandala following the departure of Sanaipei Tande.

=== Philanthropy and advocacy ===
Mwalimu is actively involved in the Kenyan creative community and serves as a committee member of the Kenya Actors Guild (KAG). She has used her platform to advocate against gender-based violence (GBV), participating in theatre productions and awareness campaigns addressing the issue.

She is also the founder of The Mbeki Mwalimu Initiative (TMI), which focuses on mentorship programs and providing essential supplies to children from underprivileged backgrounds.

== Filmography ==
=== Films and television ===
Year	Title	Role	Notes	Ref
2020	Sincerely Daisy	Wendy	Drama	
2022	Baba	Kevin's mum		
2016	Tabasamu	As the Director	Comedy	
2016 - 2017	Kookoo Inn		TV series	
2018-2022	Selina	Zoe Mackenzie	TV Series	
2024-Present	Kina	Nana Tandala	TV Series	
2010	Tahidi high	Cameo	TV Series	

== Awards and nominations ==
Year	Award	Category	Show	Results	Ref
2018	Sanaa Theatre Awards	Best Theatre Director	Strangers by Blood and Legally Insane	Won	
2020	Kalasha Awards	Best Supporting Actress	Sincerely Daisy	Nominated	
