= Anisia Achieng =

South Sudanese politician

Member of South Sudanese Parliament, representing Eastern Equatoria

Personal details
- Education: Catholic University of Eastern Africa

Anisia Karlo Achieng Olworo is a South Sudanese MP and women's rights activist.

== Early life in Sudan ==
Achieng was born in the South Sudan. Her mother died when she was young and her father died in the civil war. Afterwards she was raised in an orphanage by missionaries who relocated to Uganda. Achieng finished her secondary schooling there and insisted on returning to Sudan to look for her relatives. Following school, she returned to South Sudan to pursue police training and nursing before finding work with Norwegian Church Aid. She was forced out of the country again by the war and relocated to Nairobi where she volunteered for the United Nations High Commissioner for Refugees and attended the Catholic University of Eastern Africa.

== Escape to Kenya and activism ==
Achieng was living in the Nuba Mountains in 1993, when the army and rebels entered the region, forcing her to flee to Kenya to escape the war. Her one and six-year-old children escaped to Uganda with her sister. In Nairobi, Achieng was a co-founder of Sudanese Women's Voice for Peace, a non-governmental organisation devoted to combatting human rights abuses in the Sudan.

Achieng was a delegate alongside Fatima Ahmed Ibrahim for the 1995 Harvest for Sudan: Women's Peace Initiative conference in Nairobi. In 1995–96, Olworo travelled throughout Canada with Ibrahim on a speaking tour to inform people about the war atrocities and women's rights violations taking place in Sudan. She informed the Catholic New Times of Toronto that children and women were being sold into slavery for as little as $35.

In 1998, Achieng earned a BA in social sciences from the Catholic University of Eastern Africa in Nairobi. She also attended the Mindolo Ecumenical Foundation – Pan Africa Institute based in Kitwe where she earned a diploma in Women Leadership.

Following the signing of the Comprehensive Peace Agreement, Achieng and the Women Peace Network Southern Sudan conducted trainings to create awareness of the interim constitution's impact on women.

As a Catholic Relief Services peacebuilding officer, Achieng inspired the Road to Peace project that began in May 2007. The food-for-work project involved building a road between Ikotos and Imatong. She was also involved with a Center for Justice and Peacebuilding program in Sudan.

== Political career ==
Achieng became a Member of Parliament from South Sudan representing Eastern Equatoria. She is also a member of the Intergovernmental Authority on Development in Eastern Africa.

== Personal life ==
Achieng is Christian and has two birth children and an adopted son.
