= Teresa Wacera Kìragū =

Sister Doctor Teresa Kiragu
- Occupations: Theologian and Lecturer

Academic background
- Education: Diploma in Philosophy - Catholic University of Eastern Africa (CUEA) Bachelor's degree in philosophy and sacred theology - Catholic University of Eastern Africa (CUEA) Master's degree in moral theology- Catholic University of Eastern Africa (CUEA) Ph.D. in moral theology- Catholic University of Eastern Africa (CUEA)-2021
- Alma mater: Catholic University of Eastern Africa (CUEA)
- Thesis: Holistic Healthcare Ethics and a Culture of Life: Towards a New Approach to Healing in Catholic Hospitals in Africa

Academic work
- Discipline: Moral theology
- Institutions: Catholic University of Eastern Africa (CUEA) Centre for Social Justice and Ethics Vvisiting lecturer at the Institute of Catechetical and Pastoral Ministry AOSK- Chemi Chemi Ya Uzima Assumption Sisters of the Blessed Virgin Mary of Nairobi

Teresa Wacera Kìragū, is a Kenyan Catholic religious sister of the Assumption Sisters of the Blessed Virgin Mary of Nairobi, moral theologian, researcher, writer, and lecturer. Kiragu has contributed to healthcare ethics and moral theology in Africa, her service as African regional coordinator for the Catholic Theological Ethics in the World Church (CTEWC), and her selection as a 2024 fellow of the Women Faith Leaders Fellowship at Georgetown University. She has contributed to the formation of pastoral agents and catechists at the Association of Sisterhoods of Kenya's (AOSK) Chemi Chemi Ya Uzima Institute of Pastoral and Catechetical Ministry. Her scholarship focuses on holistic healthcare ethics in African Catholic hospitals and the integration of ethical reflection with pastoral and social practice.

== Early life and education ==
Kiragu was born in Othaya, Central Kenya, and is the youngest of eight siblings. She was raised in a devout Catholic family and discerned a vocation to religious life at an early age, eventually joining the Assumption Sisters of the Blessed Virgin Mary of Nairobi.

Kìragū pursued her higher education at the Catholic University of Eastern Africa (CUEA), where she obtained a diploma in philosophy, undergraduate degrees in philosophy and sacred theology. She later earned both a Master of Arts and a Ph.D. in Moral Theology from the same institution in 2021 Her doctoral dissertation, Holistic Healthcare Ethics and a Culture of Life: Towards a New Approach to Healing in Catholic Hospitals in Africa, examines ethical frameworks for healing practices within Catholic healthcare systems on the continent. Kiragu is currently a postdoctoral fellow at Boston College.

== Career ==
Kìragū serves as a lecturer in theology and ethics at the Catholic University of Eastern Africa, where she teaches moral theology, bioethics, and social ethics, and has also contributed to the formation of pastoral agents and catechists at the Association of Sisterhoods of Kenya's (AOSK) Chemi Chemi Ya Uzima Institute of Pastoral and Catechetical Ministry. Her academic and professional work focuses on healthcare ethics, virtue ethics, Catholic moral theology, and social ethics, including active involvement in hospital ethics committees, workshops, and the development of ethical guidelines for Catholic health institutions.

Kiragu is the African regional coordinator for the Catholic Theological Ethics in the World Church (CTEWC), a global network promoting theological scholarship and dialogue, and participates in continental initiatives such as the Pan-African Catholic Theology and Pastoral Network (PACTPAN), advancing conversations on health, healing, and pastoral theology in Africa. In 2024, she was selected as a fellow of the Women Faith Leaders Fellowship at Georgetown University, recognizing her contributions to global theological scholarship and ethical leadership. A central focus of her career has been advancing holistic healthcare ethics in African Catholic hospitals, integrating human dignity, pastoral care, and bioethical reflection within faith-based healthcare, with extensive publications attesting to her scholarly expertise.

== Publication ==
Kiragu, T. W. (2022). Holistic healthcare ethics and culture of life: Towards a new approach to healing in Catholic hospitals in Africa (Doctoral dissertation). Catholic University of Eastern Africa Press.

Kiragu, T., Mugambi, D. K., & Kinai, T. (2022). Field dependent‑independent cognitive styles as correlates of reading comprehension performance among form two students in Kiambu County, Kenya. International Journal of Research and Innovation in Social Science, 6(8), 490–498.

Kiragu, T., Mugambi, D. K., & Kinai, T. (2022). Learning goal orientations as correlates of reading comprehension performance among secondary school students in Kiambu County, Kenya. International Journal of Research and Innovation in Social Science, 6(8), 532–546.

Kiragu, T., Isoe, J., & Muthui, P. (2023). Gender differences in field dependent and field independent cognitive learning styles toward reading comprehension among secondary school students in Kiambu County, Kenya. International Journal of Research and Innovation in Social Science (IJRISS), 7(10), 2209–2217.

Kiragu, T. W. (2020). Ethics of Artificial Intelligence in Healthcare. Paper presented at the Bioethics Society of Kenya Annual Conference, Mombasa, Kenya.

Reproduction and the Common Good: Global Perspectives from the Catholic Tradition (2024). Edited volume addressing global ethical dimensions of reproduction.
