= Zelda Harris =

American actress

- Occupation: Actress
- Years active: 1988—present

Zelda Harris is an American actress.

Harris attended Princeton University, where she was a member of the Class of 2007.

She began acting at age three. Harris beat out more than one thousand other children for the role of Troy Carmichael in Spike Lee's Crooklyn, the role for which she is best known. She also played Jessi Ramsey in The Baby-Sitters Club film.

Subsequent to her acting work, Harris was a singer with Zelda and the Lo Los. As of 2021, she is working as a teacher.

== Filmography ==
=== Film ===
Year	Title	Role	Notes
1994	Crooklyn	Troy Carmichael	
1995	The Baby-Sitters Club	Jessi Ramsey	
1998	He Got Game	Mary Shuttlesworth	

=== Television ===
Year	Title	Role	Notes
1988–1994	Sesame Street	Herself	Recurring Role
1991	I'll Fly Away	Adlaine	Episode: "The Hat"
1994	Law & Order	Janel Decker	Episode: "Nurture"
1995	The Piano Lesson	Maretha	TV film
1996–1997	Second Noah	Bethany Beckett	Main role (22 episodes)
1997	Clover	Clover	TV film
1998	413 Hope St.	Morica	Episode: "Falling"
1998	Cosby	Nikki	Episode: "A Team of His Own"
2002	NYPD Blue	Saraia Dobbs	Episode: "Below the Belt"
2014	Warzone	Harriet	Episode: "Allegiance"
2014	Comedy Corner	Nell	Episode: "The Intervention"
2014	All About Family	Anna	Episode: "Damages"
