= Camille Storm =

Kenyan music executive

- Born: Angela Kariuki
- Education: Catholic University of Eastern Africa
- Occupations: Music executive; Journalist; Entrepreneur; Publicist; PR
- Years active: 2011–present
- Organization(s): Camille & Co.
- Known for: Camille & Co. Distro

Angela Kariuki well known as Camille Storm, is a Kenyan music executive, journalist, talent developer, publicist, entrepreneur, and curator, pioneering the East African pop culture. She is the founder of Camille & Co., and a music journalist, and pop culture contributor for OkayAfrica, and The Fader. In 2022, Camille joined All Africa Music Awards, as one of its juries for East Africa.

== Early life ==
Angela Kariuki was born in Nairobi, Kenya, where she had her education (primary, secondary, and tertiary), before gaining admission into the Catholic University of Eastern Africa, where she studied Computer Science, and obtained her B.Sc in Computer Science.

== Career ==
In 2011, Angela (alias. Camille Storm) started up a music blog called The Camille Way, in which she published critiques and music reviews. In 2018, she launched her career as a music journalist for Up Magazine, Boiler Room, Daily Nation, Thought Catalog, OkayAfrica, The Fader, and Coeval Magazine. She founded Camille & Co., an entertainment, and music recording company whose services include: public relations, talent management, A&R consulting and bookings, with a division for music distribution in 2018.

She began her A&R and public relations career with clients including Mayorkun, Blaqbonez, Lojay, Bad Boy Timz, WANI, Triller Inc., Mdundo, Mavin Records, and Chocolate City. On 29 March 2019, OkayAfrica announced Camille, as the curator of the Hand-Forged In Kenya, a music festival created to celebrate East African pop culture through music. The festival is supported by OkayAfrica, The Alchemist Bar, and Bateleur Brewery. On 6 April 2019, the first edition was held in Nairobi, with Kenya's fast-rising talents headlining the show. On 25 April 2019, she appeared on Push Good Music, a radio show on The Beat 99.9 FM Lagos, alongside Mr. P, with show host Douglas Jekan.

On 24 July 2020, she announced the launch of Camille & Co. Distro, a primary music distribution division of Camille & Co.. C&C distribution (aka Camille & Co. Distro) services include music licensing, and music promotion. On 4 December 2020, Camille was cited as one of The music power players of 2020 by People Daily Kenya. On 20 January 2022, The Native listed her among the 10 African Music Executives To Keep Tabs On. In August 2022, she joined AFRIMA, as its jury Member for East Africa. On 9 January 2023, Camille Storm appeared as one of five judges on the Booming on Boomplay music competition, hosted by the media streaming and download company Boomplay.

=== Public speaking ===
- Personal branding summit (2023).

== Selected publications ==
- 'Kyenvu' Is the Short Film Challenging Uganda’s Controversial Mini-Skirt Bill (2018).
- Rema is Nigerian pop’s golden child (2019).
- Gengetone is the new sound accelerating out of Kenya's streets (2020).
- Nigeria's LONDON Is Producing Afro Sounds of the Future (2023).
