= Dolapo Adeleke =

Nigerian filmmaker (born 1990)

- Born: Adedolapo Omolola Adeleke; 6 September 1990 (age 35); Kano State
- Other name: LowlaDee
- Education: Covenant University
- Occupations: director, screenwriter, producer, editor
- Years active: 2011–present

Dolapo Adeleke (born 6 September 1990), also known as LowlaDee, is a filmmaker from Nigeria.

== Early life and education ==
Born on September 6, 1990, in Kano State Nigeria, Adeleke began writing at an early age, publishing two literature books before university. Adeleke had her secondary education at Dansol High School, Lagos State. She graduated with a second-class upper in Mass Communication from Covenant University in 2011.

== Career ==
In an interview with Busayo Adekoya of ThisDay Newspaper, she stated that she began directing films at 21. In 2012, she was included in Vanguard list of young Nigerians making significant impact, and was noted to have won Best teen writer of the year award by Angles Magazine for writing Flesh and Blood and The Little White Hen.

With her break out short film Brave, starring Adesua Etomi and Wole Ojo, She was nominated under the Best Film Director category of the Nigerian Entertainment Awards (NEA 2015). The short film went on to win Best Short film at the Best Of Nollywood Awards and also nominated in two categories at the prestigious African Magic Viewers Choice Awards (AMVCA) for Best Short film and Best Actor in a Drama. In 2015, she went on to produce her first critically acclaimed Television Film A Place Called Happy merging Nigerian and Ghanaian actors.

In 2016, she released her first highly acclaimed Mini Series This Is It on her YouTube Platform merging Nigerian and Kenyan cast. It instantly gained popularity gathering over 8 million views in its entirety. The series successfully launched in various Television Broadcast stations across Africa and went on to win the Best Television Series at the Africa Magic Viewers Choice Awards (AMVCA) 2018. LowlaDee Wrote, Directed and Edited the 20 episodes while working as the Show Runner.

In 2016, LowlaDee was also nominated for the EbonyLifeTV Sisterhood Awards Africa for ‘Film Director Of The Year’ for her achievement with the Mini Series, ‘This Is It’. In 2017, she was nominated for the prestigious ‘Future Awards Africa’ for the prize of New Media and in March 2018 she was listed as Leading Ladies Africa's ‘100 Most Inspiring Women In Nigeria.’

LowlaDee Wrote, Directed and Edited the 60 minutes Valentine's Day Digital film, PLAN B, a Kenyan-Nigerian story which became an instant hit, garnering over one million views in its first two weeks without paid advertising. The movie went on to win the Best East African Film at the Africa Magic Viewers Choice Awards 2019.

She currently runs LowlaDee Productions Co. (formerly Doreen Media) and shuffles between Lagos Nigeria and Nairobi Kenya.

== Filmography ==
Year	Film	Notes
2013	Be My Guest	short film
2013	The Call	short film starred Eldee, Paul Utomi and Adesua Etomi
2014	Brave	short film starred Adesua Etomi
2015	A Place Called Happy	Television Film starred Blossom Chukwujekwu and Kiki Omeili
2016	This Is It	Web/Television series starred Nick Mutuma and Chy Nwakanma
2017	Entangled	Television Film starred Mawuli Gavor, Ini-dima Okojie
2019	Plan B	Web/Television Film starred Sarah Hassan, Catherine Karanja and Daniel Etim Effiong.
2020	Just In Time	Feature Film Starred Sarah Hassan, Mawuli Gavor, Stycie Waweru, Pierra Kenna and had its premier on Netflix Worldwide.

== Awards ==
Year	Award	Category	Film	Result	Ref
2014	Best of Nollywood Awards	Best Short Film	Brave	Won	
2015	Nigeria Entertainment Awards	Best Director	Brave	Nominated	
2015	Africa Magic Viewers Choice Awards	Best Short Film	Brave	Nominated	
2016	EbonyLife Sisterhood Awards Africa	Film Director of the Year	This Is It	Nominated	
2018	Africa Magic Viewers Choice Awards	Best Television Series	This Is it	Won	
2019	Africa Magic Viewers Choice Awards	Best East African Film	Plan B	Won	
2021	Kalasha International Film and TV Awards	Best Feature Film	Just In Time	Won	
2022	Africa Magic Viewers' Choice Awards	Best Picture Editor	Just In Time	Pending	
2022	Africa Magic Viewers' Choice Awards	Best Movie East Africa	Just In Time	Pending	
2022	Africa Magic Viewers' Choice Awards	Best Overall Movie	Just In Time	Pending	

== Personal life ==
At 16 years old, on 20 August 2007, on her way to get certain documents from school, after gaining admission to Covenant University, Adeleke was involved in a brake failure accident that resulted to multiple surgeries and scars on her forehead. This led to her signature fringe/bangs hairstyle. According to her, it is more than just a hairstyle but empowers her to rise above the trauma and effects of the life changing accident. On an Instagram post, LowlaDee revealed she once struggled with depression but watching American-Indian TV show runner and Actress Mindy Kaling's TV show, The Mindy Project, gave her joy and awakened a fun creative side. This connection gave birth to her highly successful Romcom web series ''This Is It.''

== See also ==
- List of Nigerian film producers
