= Nick Mutuma =

Kenyan actor, producer and TV/Radio host

- Born: Nicholas Munene Mutuma; 22 September 1988 (age 37); Meru, Kenya
- Citizenship: Kenya
- Education: United States International University Africa
- Alma mater: Bachelors in International Business Administration
- Occupations: Actor; TV/Radio personality; Producer
- Years active: 2008 - present
- Notable work: MTV Shuga; Nivea Fresh Active TVC; This is It; Disconnect; Skinny Girl in Transit (Sn5)
- Height: 6.0
- Children: 1

Nicholas Munene Mutuma is a Kenyan actor, producer, television/radio host and corporate emcee. He has been working professionally since 2008.

Born in Meru, Mutuma grew up in Dar es Salaam, Tanzania, where he completed his primary education before joining Braeside School in Nairobi for his secondary education.

His first break on TV came when he was cast in the Citizen TV show, "Tabasamu", portraying the character Luka.

His role in the drama series, Shuga where he acted alongside Lupita Nyong'o became his big break in his stage performance.

In 2015, Mutuma featured in a popular web series; "This Is It", which became very successful with over one million views in the first five months.

== Early life ==
Born in Meru, Kenya, Mutuma had a far family which he never spoke about. Nick Mutuma grew up in Dar es Salaam, Tanzania, where he completed his primary school education at the International School of Tanganyika. It was during his early years that he discovered his love for performance arts, and would often participate in school plays. He joined Braeside School (Nairobi), where he completed his high-school education (O-level).

In 2005, he joined United States International University Africa, graduating in 2010 with a Bsc. International Business Administration.

== Career ==
=== Acting ===
His debut into the Kenyan television was in 2008 when he was cast for the character Luka, a young naïve college student living in poverty, who gets involved with an older woman, a "sugar mummy". The controversial role received mixed reviews from the general public.

In the same year, he also appeared in M-Net's first Pan-African drama series Changes, directed by Tosh Gitonga, portraying Richard, a young man who learns that he was kidnapped from the hospital after being born. His is a journey of coming of age and seeking identity. Mutuma retained the role for three seasons.

His break-out role came in 2008 when he was cast for the drama series Shuga (2008); directed by Teboho Mahallesi, the show revolves around the fast lives of Nairobi youth and their risky sexual behavior. The hit show launched the careers of a new crop of Kenyan actors, including the Oscar-winning actress Lupita Nyong'o. The fourth season premiered in September 2015 and was directed by award-winning director Biyi Bandele. The fifth season MTV Shuga: Down South premiered March 2017 with the character Leo played by him and the series is ongoing. He is the only one among the Shuga cast that has been present in all five seasons.

Mutuma starred the 2014 Zuku series State House, in which he played the spoiled and stubborn son of the president of Kenya, who falls in love with the daughter of one of the staff. The show was directed by Wanuri Kahiu.

In 2016, Mutuma landed the role of Tomide in the hit Nigerian online series This Is It created, written and directed by Dolapo Adeleke (LowlaDee). The room/com follows the first year journey of the young, clueless newlyweds, Tomide (Nick Mutuma) and Dede (Chiagoziem Nwakanma). This Is It began airing 13 September 2016 on LowlaDeeTV's YouTube Channel and airs across African broadcast stations. Nick Mutuma is widely praised for his performance in the critically acclaimed ongoing series. The second season premiered on 26 September 2017. This Is It received an AMVCA Nomination 2018 for Best TV Series.

In 2018, Mutuma starred in Kenyan RomCom Disconnect directed by Tosh Gitonga. The movie premiered across theatres nationwide on 21 April 2018. The movie did exceptionally well in cinemas and is available online on Koko. Nick Mutuma was also credited as associate producer on the film.

In 2018, Nick Mutuma joined the cast of Skinny Girl in Transit for the fifth season of the popular YouTube series.

In 2019, Mutuma directed his first movie called You Again. This movie which he also produced, was shot by the Giraffe Africa Films.

In 2021, he produced and directed the Kenyan romantic comedy film Sincerely Daisy which was distributed by Netflix.

In 2024, he directed and produced the Showmax original Big Girl Small World.

=== Radio ===
In 2012, Mutuma was recruited in 1FMs events department, where he worked briefly as the station's promotions coordinator before being promoted to events manager. It was during this time that he explored other areas in radio and discovered his love for radio presenting. He hosted popular radio show The Chill Spot on 91.5 Hits from 2013 to 2015, when he decided to leave the show to concentrate on acting.

=== Television ===
In 2014, Mutuma became the new host of Africa Magic's premier Lifestyle TV show Mashariki Mix. The show was ranked third on Africaranking.com for the most-watched African TVs shows in 2015. He has also hosted the Africa Magic Viewers Choice awards red carpet (2014) and the AMVCA nomination night (2014). Other hosting jobs include popular game show Zindua Chapaa (2015), a TV lottery show in Kenya.

=== Personal life ===
In 2018, Nick welcomed a baby girl (Dua Mutuma) with his girlfriend Bridget Shighadi.

=== Music ===
In 2013, Mutuma released his first single, "254 anthem", featuring Lyra Aoko. It was a Rap/Kapuka-infused song that celebrated all things good about Kenya. The track received mixed reactions from fans and critiques alike. In September 2014, Nick released a follow-up single, "That Life", featuring Cool Kid Taffie.

Modelling

Alcott

Nivea Fresh Active (2015)

=== Additional information ===
Mutuma was ranked second on Actors.co.ke among the "top ten sexy actors in Kenya", the second on the "Top ten Kenyan male actors" by mwakilishi.com and sexiest Kenyan man by homeboyzradio website. In 2013, he was the highest-paid actor in Kenya.
