= QueenArrow =

Kenyan esports player and content creator

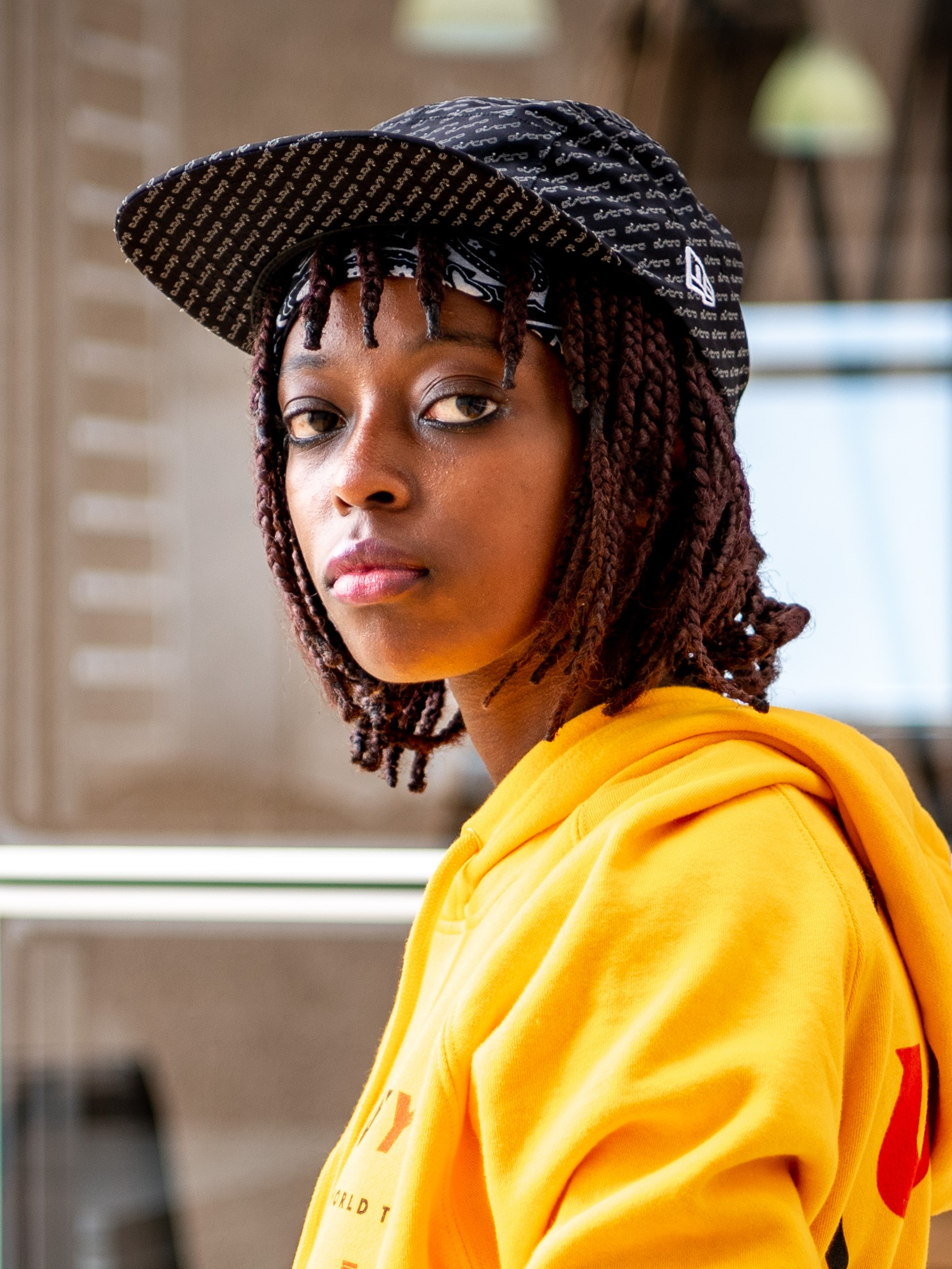
- QueenArrow in 2021

Personal information
- Born: Sylvia Gathoni Wahome; 5 July 1998 (age 28)
- Nationality: Kenyan

Current team
- Team: NIBBLE
- Game: Tekken

Career information
- Games: Mortal Kombat XL; Tekken 7; Tekken 8
- Playing career: 2017–present

Team history
- 2018–2019: XiT Woundz
- 2020: Brutal Democracy
- 2021–2023: UYU
- 2023–: NIBBLE

Sylvia Gathoni Wahome (born 5 July 1998), better known online as QueenArrow, is a Kenyan esports player and content creator. She began her competitive career in 2017 and specialises in fighting games, primarily in the Tekken series. In 2018, she became the first woman in East Africa to be signed by a professional esports team when she joined American organisation XiT Woundz (now known as XiT Gaming).

== Early life ==
Gathoni began playing video games at the age of three, having been influenced by her older brother and cousin. She enjoyed playing games such as Super Mario, Contra and Tapper, but later gravitated towards fighting games, in particular Mortal Kombat and Street Fighter. She was introduced to Tekken after her father bought her and her brother a PlayStation 2 console.

== Career ==
In 2017, Gathoni began her competitive career with the Mortal Kombat XL tournament at the inaugural edition of the East African Gaming Convention, finishing in fourth place. In January 2018, Gathoni began competing in a local Tekken league known as the Tekken 254 Circuit (now known as the Savanna Circuit), ranking nineteenth and seventeenth overall in Seasons One and Two, respectively.

In May 2018, Gathoni was signed by XiT Woundz (now known as XiT Gaming), an esports organisation based in New Jersey, becoming the first Kenyan and the first woman in East Africa to be signed by a professional esports team.

In October 2019, Gathoni earned her first major tournament win at the Nyeri leg of the Safaricom Blaze Esports Tour. In January 2020, Gathoni left XiT Woundz to join British team Brutal Democracy. She announced her departure from the team in August the same year.

In February 2021, American esports team UYU announced the signing of Gathoni as part of their content team. In October 2021, Gathoni graduated with a Bachelor of Laws degree from the Catholic University of Eastern Africa.

In March 2022, Gathoni joined the Kenya School of Law for her post-graduate diploma in Law. In June 2022, she was named in the Forbes Africa 30 Under 30 class of 2022. On 17 October 2022, Gathoni was unveiled as a sponsored Red Bull athlete, becoming the first Kenyan athlete of any discipline to do so.

In March 2023, Gathoni joined South African esports team NIBBLE.

== Tournament record ==
=== Tekken 254 Circuit / Savanna Circuit ===
Appearances by year, season, and tournament
Date	Tournament	Game	Location	Place	Ref
Season One
27 January 2018	Round One	Tekken 7	Nairobi, Kenya	T-12th	
17 February 2018	Round Two	Tekken 7	Nairobi, Kenya	T-12th	
10 March 2018	Round Three	Tekken 7	Nairobi, Kenya	T-12th	
31 March 2018	Final Round	Tekken 7	Nairobi, Kenya	T-12th	
Season Two (Premier Division)
7 July 2018	Qualifier One	Tekken 7	Nairobi, Kenya	18th	
21 July 2018	Qualifier Two	Tekken 7	Nairobi, Kenya	18th	
4 August 2018	Qualifier Three	Tekken 7	Nairobi, Kenya	15th	
Season Three (Premier Division)
26 January 2019	Qualifier One	Tekken 7	Nairobi, Kenya	20th	
23 February 2019	Qualifier Two	Tekken 7	Nairobi, Kenya	17th	
23 March 2019	Qualifier Three	Tekken 7	Nairobi, Kenya	16th	
4 May 2019	Qualifier Four	Tekken 7	Nairobi, Kenya	13th	
8 June 2019	Qualifier Five	Tekken 7	Nairobi, Kenya	24th^{a}	
6 July 2019	Qualifier Six	Tekken 7	Nairobi, Kenya	24th^{a}	
Season Four
25 January 2020	Qualifier One	Tekken 7	Nairobi, Kenya	T-17th	
29 February 2020	Qualifier Two	Tekken 7	Nairobi, Kenya	T-7th	

Final rankings by year and season
Year	Season	Game	Rank	Ref
2018	Season One	Tekken 7	19th	
2018	Season Two (Premier Division)	Tekken 7	17th	
2019	Season Three (Premier Division)	Tekken 7	19th	

- ^{^a} Did not attend the tournament.

=== Other ===
Year	Tournament	Game	Location	Place	Ref
2017	East African Gaming Convention	Mortal Kombat XL	Nairobi, Kenya	4th	
2019	Safaricom Blaze Esports Tour (Nyeri)	Tekken 7	Nyeri, Kenya	1st	
2021	Red Bull Hit the Streets	Tekken 7	Johannesburg, South Africa	5th	
2022	CANOC Esports Series	Tekken 7	Pointe-à-Pitre, Guadeloupe	5th (Mixed event)	
2022	CANOC Esports Series	Tekken 7	Pointe-à-Pitre, Guadeloupe	1st (Women's event)	
2023	Evo Las Vegas	Tekken 7	(United States) Las Vegas, Nevada, U.S.	193rd	
2023	Kenya Universities Esports League	Tekken 7	Nairobi, Kenya	3rd	
2023	Swahili Esports Champions	Tekken 7	Nairobi, Kenya	2nd	
2024	Final Round	Tekken 7	Nairobi, Kenya	5th	
2024	First Blood	Tekken 8	Nairobi, Kenya	4th	
2024	King of the Iron Fist 2	Tekken 8	Nairobi, Kenya	3rd	
