= Clover (1997 film) =

1997 American television film

- Genre: Drama
- Based on: Clover by Dori Sanders
- Screenplay by: Bill Cain
- Directed by: Jud Taylor
- Starring: Elizabeth McGovern; Ernie Hudson; Zelda Harris; Loretta Devine; Beatrice Winde; Ron Canada
- Theme music composer: Lawrence Shragge
- Country of origin: United States
- Original language: English

Production
- Producers: Njeri Karago; Robert Halmi, Sr. Richard Schlesinger
- Production locations: Eustis, Florida; Lake Helen, Florida; Orlando, Florida; Sanford, Florida
- Cinematography: David Connell
- Editor: Ron Wisman
- Running time: 91 mins.
- Production companies: Hallmark Entertainment; RHI Entertainment; USA Pictures

Original release
- Network: USA
- Release: September 10, 1997

Clover is a 1997 American made-for-television drama film that first aired on USA Network starring Elizabeth McGovern, Ernie Hudson, Zelda Harris and Beatrice Winde based on Dori Sanders' bestselling 1990 novel Clover.

== Plot ==
White Sara Kate (McGovern) marries Gaten Hill (Hudson), a black widowed father. Shortly after their wedding, Gaten dies in an auto crash. So Sara has to take care of Gaten's daughter, Clover (Harris). Problem is, she and Clover have not exactly bonded and several of Gaten's friends and relatives object to her being Clover's guardian.
