= Njeri Karago =

Kenyan film producer (1960–2022)

- Born: Njeri Njiiri Karago; 1960
- Died: December 2, 2022 (aged 61–62)
- Citizenship: Kenyan
- Occupation: Film Producer
- Notable work: The Ascent

Njeri Njiiri Karago (1960-2022) was a Kenyan film producer and served as Kenyan Consul-General for the consulate in Los Angeles.

== Education ==
Njeri got a Masters of Fine Arts Degree (Theatre, Film and Television) from the University of California, Los Angeles and a Bachelor of Arts degree from Kenyatta University.

== Career ==
Njeri was a Kenyan film producer known for her work on several local productions.

=== Filmography ===
- The Ascent (1994)
- The Great Elephant Escape (1995)
- Bridge of Time (1997)
- Robinson Crusoe (1997)
- Clover (1997)
- Hidden Blessings (2000, executive)
- Dangerous Affair (2002, executive)
- Money and the Cross (2006)
- Disconnect (2018)

She was appointed as a Consul General to the Kenyan Consulate in Los Angeles in July 2019 and served until 2022.

In January 2022 she was appointed as the chairperson of the Kenya Film Classification Board for a three year period.

== Awards ==
Njeri won the Lifetime Achievement Award at the 2018 Kalasha Awards.

She was also honored with a Head of State's Commendation (HSC) in the 2006 Jamhuri Day celebrations.
