= Tim Rimbui =

Kenyan record producer

Tim Rimbui (born 3 August 1981), better known as "Ennovator" is a Kenyan record producer, sound engineer and songwriter who has worked with many prominent Kenyan and East African artists. He is generally thought of as one of the leading music producers in Kenya. With the foresight of being creative, innovative and unique he chose the name Ennovator, which would best describe his sound and approach to music production.

== Musical background ==
Tim fell in love with music at an early age while attending Sunday school at Lavington United Church, Nairobi. He later started playing the piano and keyboards at the age of 9. Tim was inspired early in his life to pursue music as a career after watching five alive – a Kenyan a cappella group that graced the Kenyan music scene in the early 1990s. He studied music in high school – at Nairobi School and later at St. Mary’s School, Nairobi. He also received music training in theory and recording from Wisseloord Studios and The Rock Academy in the Netherlands.

== Career ==
Rimbui's first experience in music production was as an assistant sound engineer at Rough Cuts Productions and later at Samawati Productions as a sound engineer/producer. While at Samawati he began working under the moniker “Ennovator”. In 2004 Tim Rimbui left Samawati to partner with Kora Award winner and one of Africa's top World Music artists Eric Wainaina to form Enkare, a music studio and Production Company.

Rimbui specializes in R&B and Afrobeat. He has worked with renowned Kenyan artists such as Kora award winner Eric Wainaina, Suzanna Owiyo and Gallo Records’ artist Valerie Kimani. Tim has produced 3 Kora Award Winning artists: Neema Ntalel – Best East African Artist Category (2005); Kaz – Most Promising Female Artist Category (2005); and DNG – Best Gospel Artist Category (2004). He has also received 5 nominations for the Producer of the year at the Kisima Music Awards.

In 2007 he partnered with Wandiri Karimi to form Ennovatormusic Ltd, a Production Company that undertakes writing, producing and recording for bands and solo musicians and recently entered music production for film, radio, television and other commercials. They later formed Ennovatormusic Publishing Company in 2008 after signing an agreement with Sheer Publishing Company in South Africa which handles all the intellectual property rights.

Tim's influence and inspiration are drawn from Quincy Jones’ work on Michael Jackson’s Thriller, as well as Ted Riley on Black Street. Producers such as Timothy Mosley (Timbaland), Kanye West and will.i.am have also influenced him and so have African musicians Freshlyground, Lira, Aṣa and Richard Bona.

== Personal life ==
A second born to Thomas and Zipporah Rimbui. The Rimbui siblings, Aaron Rimbui and Ruth Karimi Rimbui are in Kenya's entertainment industry.

Rimbui is a father of two children born in 2010 and 2013 respectively. He and his wife, Wandiri Mugambi, amicably divorced.

== Discography ==
=== Albums ===
- Well Seasoned, A Kenyan Christmas (2003)
- K-South- Nairobism (2003)
- Gospel Fathers – Sina Madeni (2003)
- Kigezi Ndoto (2006)
- Eric Wainaina – Twende Twende (2007)
- Atemi – Hatimaye (2008)
- Action Aid- Hunger Free Album (2008)
- Kinanda (2008)

=== Singles ===
- Kayamba Africa (2002)
- Mission Driven (2002)
- Mercy Myra – Imagine, Soul Satisfaction (2003)
- Neema – Jiwe (2005)
- Pam – Dhahabu, TearDrops, Nieleze (2005)
- Kaz – Malaika, Nakupenda, Tamara, Muziki (2007)
- Atemi - Hatimaye - Speechless, Happy, Machozi, Imenibamba, Fire, Cant make you love me (2007)
- Eric Wainaina – Twende Twende – Subhaa (2007)
- Valerie Kimani – Baiskeli – Ndoto Langu
- Kanji Mbugua - Stories – What If (2008)

=== Live Recording and Mixing ===
- Nairobi Chamber Chorus - (Recording and Mix Engineer) 2008
- Mavuno Worship Project- (Recording and Mix Engineer) 2007
- Kigezi Ndoto (2006)
- Valerie Kimani - Baiskeli - Too late now (2007)

=== Corporate projects ===
- Born To Run – Standard Chartered Nairobi Marathon Anthem (2004)
- Kigezi Ndoto (2006)
- Gallo records – Valerie Kimani (2007)
- Endemol Tusker Project Fame(2007)
- Arc Works – Zuku TV campaign (2008)
- Coca-Cola – Minute Maid (2008)
- Action Aid- Hunger Free Album (2008)
- Warner Bros. - Pamoja Mtaani Video Game (2008)
- Mission to Earth - Watly - Nyado

=== Filmography ===
- Sincerely Daisy - Soundtrack - (2020)
