= Orie Rogo Manduli =

Kenyan diplomat and women's rights activist

- Born: Mary Slessor Orie Rogo; 1945; Maseno, Kisumu County, Kenya
- Died: 8 September 2021 (aged 73); Riverside, Nairobi
- Other names: Mary Slessor Orie Rogo; Mary Ondieki; Orie Rogo; Orie Rogo Manduli
- Occupations: Farmer, diplomat, rally driver, journalist
- Years active: 1964–2021
- Known for: 1974 Safari Rally
- Spouses: John Jeremiah Ondieki; Misheck Norman Manduli

Orie Rogo Manduli (née Mary Slessor Orie Rogo, 1948 – 8 September 2021) was a Kenyan diplomat, women's activist and journalist. She won the Miss Kenya beauty pageant in 1964 and in 1974, alongside Sylvia Omino was the first woman of African descent and from Kenya to compete in the East African Safari Rally.

== Background and education ==
Born in Maseno, Kisumu County in 1948 to educators Gordon Rogo and Zeruiah Adhiambo, Rogo was one of eight children and was named after Mary Slessor, a Scottish missionary.

She attended Ng'iya Girls School in Siaya, then Butere Girls High School and later Machakos Girls School. She then proceeded to Machakos Teachers College where she trained and graduated as a teacher.

After moving to Canada with her husband, she obtained a diploma in Office management from an unspecified college. In 1991, she graduated cum laude from Mount Saint Vincent University, Halifax with a degree in Public relations after which she graduated with a Masters in International relations in 1993.

== Career ==
=== Journalism ===
After her first divorce, Rogo worked as journalist at Voice of Kenya, now Kenya Broadcasting Corporation (KBC). She hosted 2 shows, Mambo Leo and Women's World, from where according to Hakika News, she "developed an interest in the Safari Rally after interviewing drivers".

=== Diplomacy ===
Rogo was involved in the pre-conference lobbying during the fourth World Conference on Women in Beijing in 1995. This earned her a position at the International Council of Women through which she gained diplomatic status by being the body's Permanent Representative to the United Nations Environment Programme and UN-Habitat.

=== Governance and Administration ===
In 2002, she unsuccessfully vied for the position of Member of Parliament for Kasarani on the Ford People ticket. Later on in January 2004, she also run for the Kisumu Town West parliamentary seat in a by-election following the death of the Joab Omino.

In 2005, she became the first woman in Kenya to head the Non Governmental Organizations Council of Kenya. Starting in March 2003, Rogo was "an ordinary member of the executive committee". She then served as a deputy chair to Gichira Kibara who later left and she was voted in to this position.

=== Motor racing ===
With Sylvia Omino as her co-driver, she competed in the 1974 East Africa Safari rally. Dubbed the "Rally Girls", they were able to finish two legs of the rally. As a rally driver she competed as Mary Ondieki.

== Personal life ==
Soon after her teacher training, Rogo married John Jeremiah Ondieki, a civil servant and emigrated to Canada. Together, with Ondieki they had three children. Her second marriage in 1980 was to Misheck Norman Manduli, a Zambian national who died in 2003.

After a long illness, Rogo died at her home on 8 September 2021. She was buried in Machete village in Saboti, Trans Nzoia.

== See also ==
- Tuta Mionki
- 1974 Safari Rally
- Miss Kenya
