= He Got Game =

1998 film directed by Spike Lee

- Theatrical release poster
- Directed by: Spike Lee
- Written by: Spike Lee
- Produced by: Jon Kilik; Spike Lee
- Starring: Denzel Washington; Ray Allen; Milla Jovovich
- Cinematography: Malik Hassan Sayeed
- Edited by: Barry Alexander Brown
- Music by: Aaron Copland
- Production companies: Touchstone Pictures; 40 Acres and a Mule Filmworks
- Distributed by: Buena Vista Pictures Distribution
- Release dates: April 25, 1998 (New York City); May 1, 1998 (United States)
- Running time: 136 minutes
- Country: United States
- Language: English
- Budget: $25 million
- Box office: $22.4 million

He Got Game is a 1998 American sports drama film written, produced and directed by Spike Lee and starring Denzel Washington and Ray Allen. The film revolves around Jake Shuttlesworth (Denzel Washington), father of the top-ranked basketball prospect in the country, Jesus Shuttlesworth (Ray Allen). Jake, in prison for killing his wife, is released on parole for a week by the state's governor to persuade his son to play for the governor's alma mater in exchange for a reduced prison sentence.

He Got Game premiered in New York City on April 25, 1998 before being released by Buena Vista Pictures Distribution on May 1, 1998 in the United States. The film received positive reviews from critics but was a box office bomb, grossing $22.4 million against a $25 million budget.

== Plot ==
Jesus Shuttlesworth, the top high-school basketball player in the United States, is being pursued by the top college basketball programs in the nation. His father, Jake, is a convicted felon serving time at Attica Correctional Facility for killing his wife, Martha, Jesus' mother, six years earlier, during a domestic violence accident which resulted in her death. Jake is granted a work release by the governor, an influential alumnus of "Big State," one of the colleges Jesus is considering, so that he might persuade his son to sign with Big State. If successful, he'll get an early release from prison.

In his first moments outside of prison, Jake contacts his daughter, Mary Shuttlesworth, who is happy to see him. When Jesus returns home from school, he refuses to look his father in the eye, and tells his sister to get rid of the "stranger" in their living room. Jesus later agrees to meet with his father at an alternative location away from Mary. Throughout the movie, Jake tries to persuade Jesus to attend Big State with seemingly no success. Eventually, he divulges the deal set up by the governor, but Jesus appears unsympathetic to his father's situation.

Flashbacks illustrate the younger Jesus' grueling basketball training under his father and the night an argument between Jake and Jesus escalated into violence, resulting in Jake accidentally killing Jesus' mother after she intervened.

Intertwined with the story of the Shuttlesworth family is the sub-plot of Dakota Barns, a prostitute who stays in the room next to Jake in a run-down hotel. Dakota is being abused by her pimp, Sweetness, which Jake overhears through the thin walls. Throughout the film, Jake helps Dakota by cleaning her wounds and giving her some of his per diem money and the two develop a romantic relationship. In one of the final scenes, Dakota rides a Greyhound bus away from New York City.

Jesus is tempted with offers of cash and women on recruiting visits to big-time basketball programs. He also considers entering the NBA draft in order to play professionally sooner and immediately lift himself and his sister out of poverty. Unable to get through to his son, Jake challenges Jesus to one last game of one-on-one basketball. If Jake wins, Jesus will sign a letter of intent to play for Big State and if Jesus wins, he can make his own decision. After a competitive start, Jake tires during the course of the game and Jesus wins. As Jake is collected for transportation back to Attica, he turns to Jesus and says, "Let me tell you something, son: You get that hatred out your heart, or you'll end up just another nigga ... like your father."

Ultimately, Jesus decides to sign to play for Big State and gives Jake his blessing. However, the governor does not give Jake the promised reduction, as Jesus did not sign the letter of intent, and Jake's work release is fabricated to the media as an escape attempt. Jake ultimately finds freedom by casting away his dreams and burdens to his son, symbolized by his throwing of an old basketball over the prison wall where it magically lands on the Big State court where Jesus is practicing alone. Jesus clutches the ball, knowing it is a message of hope from his father.

== Cast ==
- Denzel Washington as Jake Shuttlesworth
- Ray Allen as Jesus Shuttlesworth
  - Jade Yorker as Jesus Shuttlesworth (age 12)
- Milla Jovovich as Dakota Barns
- John Turturro as Coach Billy Sunday
- Rosario Dawson as Lala Bonilla
- Jim Brown as Spivey
- Joseph Lyle Taylor as Crudup
- Hill Harper as Coleman "Booger" Sykes
  - Shortee Reed as Coleman "Booger" Sykes (age 12)
- Zelda Harris as Mary Shuttlesworth
  - Quinn Harris as Mary Shuttlesworth (age 6)
- Ned Beatty as Warden Marcel Wyatt
- Bill Nunn as Uncle Bubba
- Michele Shay as Aunt Sally
- Thomas Jefferson Byrd as "Sweetness"
- Roger Guenveur Smith as Willie "Big Time Willie"
- Lonette McKee as Martha Shuttlesworth
- Travis Best as Sip
- Walter McCarty as Mance
- Kim Director as Lynn
- John Wallace as Lonnie
- Rick Fox as Chick Deagan
- Leonard Roberts as D'Andre Mackey
- Jennifer Esposito as Ms. Janus
- Chasey Lain as Buffy
- Jill Kelly as Suzie
- Al Palagonia as Dom Pagnotti
- Arthur J. Nascarella as Coach Cincotta

== Production ==
For the role of Jesus Shuttlesworth, Spike Lee drew up a list of NBA players who could pass for a high school senior. Kobe Bryant was Lee's original choice, but after Bryant shot several air balls that resulted in a brutal playoff loss to the Utah Jazz in the 1997 NBA Playoffs, he withdrew to begin an extensive workout plan to help maintain his strength throughout the season. Lee found Tracy McGrady too reserved and was not impressed by Allen Iverson's performance. Management for Kevin Garnett and Stephon Marbury wanted a guarantee that one or the other would be offered the part. Travis Best, Walter McCarty, and Rick Fox also auditioned, and Lee cast them in supporting roles. Lee approached Ray Allen during halftime of a Bucks-Knicks game, ultimately offering him the role of Jesus. Allen had never acted before, and he trained with an acting coach for eight weeks before filming.

Filming took place between July and September 1997. Locations included Coney Island, Brooklyn, Cabrini–Green housing projects in Chicago, Illinois, Elon University, Charlotte, North Carolina, and Los Angeles, California.

NBA players Shaquille O'Neal, Reggie Miller, Bill Walton, Scottie Pippen, Michael Jordan, and Charles Barkley, Syracuse University coach Jim Boeheim, NBA coaches Rick Pitino and George Karl and broadcaster Dick Vitale made cameo appearances early in the film. Former football legend Jim Brown also appears as one of Jake's parole officers, assigned to keep tabs on him while he's away from the prison.

== Release ==
=== Box office ===
He Got Game was produced on an estimated $25 million budget. In the opening weekend of its release, it was shown on 1,319 screens, and took in $7,610,663 at the U.S. box offices debuting at #1. It eventually grossed a total of $21,554,585.00, which was a box office flop considering it fell short of its $25 million budget.

=== Critical response ===
On review aggregator Rotten Tomatoes, the film holds an approval rating of 80% based on 64 reviews, with an average rating of 6.80/10. The website's critics consensus reads: "Though not without its flaws, He Got Game finds Spike Lee near the top of his game, combining trenchant commentary with his signature visuals and a strong performance from Denzel Washington." At Metacritic, the film has a weighted average score of 64 out of 100, based on 21 critics, indicating "generally favorable" reviews. Audiences polled by CinemaScore gave the film an average grade of "B+" on an A+ to F scale.

Time Out London writing, "Most scenes play too long, with a surplus of ideas, textures, tones and characters, and after 134 minutes it's clear Lee's problem with closure hasn't gone away." Roger Ebert gave the film three-and-a-half-stars, and called it Lee's best film since Malcolm X. He was particularly encouraged by Lee's determination not to adhere to typical conventions.

Both Ray Allen and Washington drew praise for their performances, with Roger Ebert writing that Allen "is that rarity, an athlete who can act," and Slate magazine writing that Washington's performance was "gorgeously underplayed".

Bill Simmons' review for ESPN pointed out factual flaws in the story: "...coaches aren't allowed to discuss potential recruits until after the signing period. Come on, Spike. (And while we're at it, players aren't allowed to visit a college one week before the signing deadline; Jesus couldn't live alone with his sister without both of them being thrown in a foster home," and argued "there's NO WAY IN HELL that Jesus wouldn't have just turned pro if he was that good and that broke.)"

== Soundtrack ==
The soundtrack for He Got Game was composed of numerous orchestral pieces by Aaron Copland with songs created by Public Enemy. It was released by Def Jam on April 21, 1998.

== Awards and nominations ==
1999 Acapulco Black Film Festival

- Best Actor — Denzel Washington (nominated)
- Best Director — Spike Lee (nominated)
- Best Screenplay — Spike Lee (nominated)
- Best Film (nominated)
- Best Soundtrack (nominated)

1999 NAACP Image Awards

- Outstanding Lead Actor in a Motion Picture — Denzel Washington (nominated)
- Outstanding Youth Actor/Actress — Zelda Harris (nominated)
- Outstanding Motion Picture (nominated)

1999 MTV Movie Awards

- MTV Movie Award Best Breakthrough Male Performance — Ray Allen (nominated)

1998 Stinkers Bad Movie Awards

- Worst Sense of Direction — Spike Lee (nominated)

== See also ==
- List of basketball films
- List of hood films
