= Beatrice Winde =

American actress

- Born: Beatrice Lucille Williams; January 5, 1924; Chicago, Illinois, U.S.
- Died: January 3, 2004 (aged 79); New York City, U.S.
- Years active: 1974–2001
- Spouse: Raymond Stough

Beatrice Winde (born Beatrice Lucille Williams; January 5, 1924 – January 3, 2004) was an American actress. Her work as a character actor, and a singer, in theatrical, television, and film roles, spanned several decades.

== Life and career ==
Winde was born in Chicago, Illinois. She graduated from the Chicago Music Conservatory as a voice student and continued her voice studies briefly at the Yale University School of Music and at Juilliard.

Winde appeared on Broadway in the 1971 Melvin Van Peebles musical Ain't Supposed to Die a Natural Death, which won her the Theatre World Award and a Tony Award nomination. Winde's screen appearances include Oliver's Story and Jefferson in Paris and television credits include The Sopranos and Law & Order.

She died of cancer on January 3, 2004, two days before her 80th birthday.

== Awards ==
- Audelco Award for Best Supporting Actress (A Lesson Before Dying, staged by the Signature Theater Company - 2001
- Living Legend Award from the National Black Theater - 1997
- Joseph Jefferson Award for Actress in a Cameo Role (The Young Man from Atlanta, Goodman Theatre, Chicago) - 1997

== Filmography ==
=== Film ===
- The Autobiography of Miss Jane Pittman (1974) — Lena
- The Taking of Pelham One Two Three (1974) — Mrs. Jenkins
- The Gambler (1974) — Hospital Receptionist
- Mandingo (1975) — Lucy
- Sparkle (1976) — Mrs. Waters
- Oliver's Story (1978) — Waltereen
- Rich Kids (1979) — Corine
- Hide in Plain Sight (1980) — Unemployment Clerk
- From the Hip (1987) — 2nd Judge
- Stars and Bars (1988) — Alma-May
- The Ambulance (1990) — Head Nurse
- A Rage in Harlem (1991) — Clerk
- The Super (1991) — Leotha
- Malcolm X (1992) — Elderly Woman
- The Last Good Time (1994) — Nurse Westman
- It Could Happen to You (1994) — Judge
- Jefferson in Paris (1995) — Mary Hemings
- Dangerous Minds (1995) — Mary Benton
- Lone Star (1996) — Minnie Bledsoe
- She's the One (1996) — Older Woman
- Clover (1997) — Aunt Katie
- The Real Blonde (1997) — Wilma
- Simon Birch (1998) — Hilde Grove
- Mickey Blue Eyes (1999) — Mrs. Horton, Michael's Neighbor
- The Hurricane (1999) — Louise Cockersham

=== Television ===
- The Doctors (March 1980) - Lillian Foster
- American Playhouse; 1 episode (1982) — Tee
- Spenser: For Hire; 1 episode (1987) — Delia Johnson
- A Man Called Hawk; 1 episode (1989) — Mother Superior
- Law & Order; 4 episodes (1991-2001) — Jackson's grandmother / Corina Roberts / Sarah De Witt / Miss Perry (final appearance)
- The Cosby Show; 1 episode (1992)
- NYPD Blue; 1 episode (1995) — Gladys Denton
- The Sopranos; 1 episode (2000) — Funeral Guest
