= Plan B (2019 film) =

2019 film written, directed and edited by Lowladee and produced by Sarah Hassan

- Directed by: Lowladee (Dolapo Adeleke)
- Written by: Lowladee
- Produced by: Sarah Hassan
- Starring: Sarah Hassan; Catherine Kamau Karanja; Daniel Etim Effiong; Lenana Kariba, Justin Mirichi; Chantelle Naisola; Zarhaa Kassam; Mary Gacheri
- Cinematography: Victor Ombogo
- Edited by: Lowladee
- Music by: Agolla; Tetu Shani; Mayonde; Wangechi
- Release date: 14 February 2019
- Running time: 60 minutes
- Country: Kenya
- Languages: English; Swahili

Plan B is a 2019 Kenyan-Nigerian romantic comedy film written, directed and edited by the Nigerian filmmaker, Lowladee. The film stars Kenyan actress and producer Sarah Hassan, Catherine Kamau Karanja, and Nigerian actor Daniel Etim Effiong who are the lead actors.

The film won the Best East African Movie award at the 2020 Africa Magic Viewers' Choice Awards (AMVCAs). The award was received by Sarah Hassan. It also got nominated under the category of Best Lighting Technician for Walter Odhiambo.

During the 2019 Kalasha International Film and TV Awards, the film got five nominations, of which it won in two categories. Sarah Hassan won under the Best Lead Actress- Film category, as Walter Odhiambo won the Best Lighting Technician award. The film was nominated in the Best Cinematography (Victor Ombogo), Best Supporting Actress- Film (Catherine Kamau) and Best Feature Film (Sarah Hassan).

== Synopsis ==
After breaking up with her boyfriend Ethan (Lenana Kariba), Lisa Waweru (Sarah Hassan) meets a strange man and becomes pregnant after engaging in a one-night stand with him. Later, Lisa learns that the man is Dele Cooker (Daniel Etim Effiong), the Nigerian CEO of a spreading Nairobi-based company. Alongside her friend Joyce (Catherine Kamau), she hatches a plan to make Dele claim responsibility for the pregnancy.

== Cast ==
- Sarah Hassan as Lisa
- Catherine Kamau Karanja as Joyce
- Daniel Etim Effiong as Dele Coker
- Lenana Kariba as Ethan
- Justin Mirichii as Dele's Lawyer
- Chantelle Naisola as Mumbi
- Zarhaa Kassam as Sara
- Maina wa Ndungu as Doctor
- Mary Gacheri as Lisa's grandma
- Patience Baraka as Dele's call girl
- Silas Ambani as Dele's P.A.
- Tracy Amadi as Boutique attendant
- Aden Machyo
- Beryl Achieng

== Production ==
The film was produced by Lowladee in collaboration with Alfajiri Productions, a Kenyan production company.

== Release ==
The movie was released on Valentine's Day, Friday 14 February 2019. It was premiered on NTV (Kenya) the night before the global release.
