= Joseph Gitile Naituli =

Gitile Naituli is a professor of management and leadership at Multimedia University of Kenya, Faculty of Business and Law. Gitile is also married to one Kristin Bakken Naituli, who is also a lecturer at Egerton University, Njoro, with whom they have two children. He teaches courses in leadership and financial management, gender and innovation management. He holds a BA in business administration and government and an MBA in management from MIU, Iowa, US, and a PhD in business management from Egerton University, Kenya. Naituli has over 20 years experience in business management and leadership gained through extensive consulting, facilitation and teaching and research.

Prior to joining Multimedia University, he was an associate professor of management and leadership at Strathmore University (2008–09), a senior lecturer of accounting and finance at Egerton University (1994–2006). Naituli serves as a visiting professor at the University of Virginia and sits on the advisory board of Environic Foundation International. Naituli is the author of more than 25 papers on management and leadership published in professional journals or presented at various conferences. He has been a consultant for UNESCO Windhoek Cluster to Angola, Lesotho, Namibia, South Africa and Eswatini. He won the 2007 UNESCO/UNEP MESA AWARD for Innovation and Application of ESD Principles in Higher Education. Naituli is the author of Principles and Practice of Financial Management, published by CUEA Press in 2011.

He is a full-time professor at the Multimedia University of Kenya, where he has taught since 2008.
