= This Is It (TV series) =

- Genre: Drama; Romance
- Directed by: Dolapo Adeleke
- Starring: Nick Mutuma; Chy Nwakanma; Bimbo Ademoye; Stan Nze
- Country of origin: Nigeria
- Original languages: English; Swahili
- No. of seasons: 2
- No. of episodes: 20

Production
- Production locations: Nigeria; Kenya
- Running time: ~ 25 minutes
- Production company: Doreen Media Africa

Original release
- Network: YouTube
- Release: 13 September 2016 – 21 November 2017

This Is It is a Nigerian romantic drama television series that ran for two seasons from September 2016 until November 2017. The series began airing on the YouTube channel of its creator, LowlaDee, but was later acquired by television networks across Africa. The story revolves around a newly married couple and the challenges they face while coming to terms of their newly attained status.

== Plot ==
Tee, aged 27, is a Kenyan-Nigerian software developer, who recently marries Dede, aged 23. As an inexperienced couple, they face challenges in trying to conform with friends, families and themselves on the present realities of their status as a newly married couple. The final episode aired in November 2017, featuring marital experiences of young couples in the real world.

== Cast ==
- Bimbo Ademoye as Kerry
- Nick Mutuma as Tomide (Tee)
- Chy Nwakanma as Dede Mwenda
- Stan Nze as Sam
- Teniola Aladese as Ndidi
- Yinka Pearce-Tijani as Mabel
- Bukola Oladipupo as Folake
- Jemima Osunde
- Olumide Oworu

== Release ==
In April 2017, the series was reported to premiere in NTV Kenya.

== Episode ==
=== Season One (2016) ===
No.	Title	Original release date
1	"Honeymoon Crashers"	13 September 2016
2	"A Kerry Cherry Day"	20 September 2016
3	"Third Base Brouhaha"	27 September 2016
4	"Back Off Umar"	4 October 2016
5	"Guy Code"	11 October 2016
6	"Clash of the Muendas"	18 October 2016
7	"The Baby Issue"	25 October 2016
8	"The Peace-Makers"	1 November 2016
9	"Triple Threat"	23 November 2016
10	"Changes"	23 November 2016

=== Season Two (2017) ===
No.	Title	Original release date
1	"Big Girl"	26 September 2017
2	"Ring the Alarm"	3 October 2017
3	"Firecracker"	10 October 2017
4	"I Think I Cheated"	17 October 2017
5	"We're Family"	24 October 2017
6	"Therapy and a Challenge"	31 October 2017
7	"The Intern"	TBA
8	"#TeamKE"	7 July 2017
9	"Reawakening"	15 November 2017
10	"This is Us (Show wrap) featuring real couples"	21 November 2017

== Reception ==
=== Critical reception ===
Abigael Arunga for Daily Nation (Kenya) praised the story and performance of the cast members, but felt that the role of "Dede" (played by Chy Nwakanma) was overly dramatized in some instances. Ife Olujuyigbe for True Nollywood Stories gave it a 75% rating, but criticized the lack of talents in the child actors used in the series, and recommended proper auditioning to fix it. It also panned the performance of "Toby", an old friend of one of the main cast, describing him as a "terrible actor". The believability of the appearance of characters in flashbacks were also highlighted as not being properly done. The film was praised for his picture quality, sound and the chemistry between "Tomide" and "Dede", with the reviewer envisaging a possibility of a real-life relationship between them. It summarized its review by concluding that "This is It is a total package of fun, love and everything in between.". It also received positive remarks from YNaija.

In November 2016, Pulse outlined romantic synergy among lead cast, artistry of its director, viewing statistics and the aura of its cast members as reasons why the series stands out and is worth a watch. In December 2017, it was ranked 5th in a top five list of best television series by Pulse Nigeria.

=== Accolades ===
Year	Event	Category	Result	Ref
2017	Eloy Awards	Best TV Actress for Chy Nwakanma	Nominated	
2018	AMVCA	Best TV series	Won	
