= Njeri Waithaka =

Kenyan lawyer

- Born: Kenya
- Citizenship: Kenyan
- Education: De Montfort University (Foundation Degree in Policing); Keele University (Bachelor of Laws); Kenya School of Law (Postgraduate Diploma in Law); University of Leicester (Master of Science in Criminology)
- Occupations: Lawyer, Corporate Executive
- Years active: 2001–present
- Title: Former Director of Safety at the National Transport and Safety Authority of Kenya

Njeri Waithaka is a Kenyan lawyer and criminologist, who served as Director of Safety at the National Transport and Safety Authority of Kenya (NTSA), from January 2016 until February 2019.

== Background and education ==
Waithaka was born in Kenya. After attending local primary and secondary schools, she was admitted to De Montfort University, in Leicester, United Kingdom, where she graduated with a Foundation Degree in Policing.

She went on to graduate from the University of Keele, in Keele, Staffordshire, United Kingdom, with a Bachelor of Laws degree. She went on to obtain a Master of Science in Criminology from the University of Leicester. She also holds a Postgraduate Diploma in Law, awarded by the Kenya School of Law. She is a member of the Kenya Bar and an Advocate of the High Court of Kenya.

== Career ==
Before joining NTSA in January 2016, she was the Head of Investigations at the Independent Policing Oversight Authority (IPOA) where she was a director. At NTSA, she served as a member of ten-person Senior Management Team at the government agency. She replaced Mathew Munyao, whose contract had expired.

Her focus at NTSA has been the investigation, understanding, mapping and demarcation of dangerous areas of Kenya's highways, with a view to reduce roadway accidents ad fatalities. Her investigation found that the two most dangerous roads in Kenya are the highway between Nairobi and Nakuru, and a 22 kilometres (14 mi) stretch of road Sobea–Salgaa–Mau Summit, on the road between Nakuru and Eldoret, known as the Salgaa stretch.

== Other considerations ==
She is a member of various professional and recreational bodies including (a) Friends of Nairobi National Park (b) The World Society for the Protection of Animals (c) Doctors Without Borders (d) The Law Society of Kenya and (e) The British Society of Criminologists.

== See also ==
- Elizabeth Lenjo
- Emma Miloyo
