= Diana Yekinni =

British Nigerian actress

- Born: Diana Yekinni; London, England
- Education: BRIT School for Performing Arts and Technology; American Academy of Dramatic Arts
- Occupation: Actress
- Years active: 2009–present

Diana Yekinni is a British Nigerian actress.

== Early life and education ==
Diana Yekinni was born and raised in South London, England. She is an alumna of the American Academy of Dramatic Arts, Los Angeles and had previously studied theatre and dance at the BRIT School for Performing Arts and Technology.

== Career ==
She started her professional acting career in 2009 after she featured in an American television series titled Medium. In 2010, she was cast as Libby in the film Ijé and Odele in Mosa. In 2012, Yekinni participated and won the maiden edition of the Annual GIAMA Screen Icon Search Competition in Houston, U.S. She has since featured in several television series and films including A New You, All That Glitters, Saro: The Musical, Jenifa's Diary as Genevieve, Lagos Cougars and Lunch Time Heroes. She also acted alongside Gal Gadot in the Netflix movie Heart of Stone where she took on the role of a secret operative (Clara, Six of Hearts) for the secret agency known as ‘The Charter’.

== Filmography ==
Film
Year	Film	Role	Notes
2023	Hearts of Stone	as Clara, Six of Hearts	Netflix
2016	DRAFTS	as Molly	Stage drama
2015	Lunch Time Heroes	as Banke Adewummi	Feature film
2015	Jenifa's Diary	as Genevieve	Television series
2014	For Coloured Girls Who Have Considered Suicide	as Lady in blue	Stage drama
2014	London Life, Lagos Living	as Cast	Stage drama
2014	Secret Lives of Baba Segi's Wives	as Nurse	Stage drama
2014	Brave	as Tammy	Short film
2013	A New You	as Chantelle	Film
2013	Lagos Cougars	—	Film
2010	Ijé	as Libby	Feature film
2010	Mosa	as Odele	Film
2009	Medium	as Jane Doe	appeared in Episode 5.11 & 5.12

== Awards and recognitions ==
Year	Award ceremony	Prize	Result	Ref
2014	2014 Golden Icons Academy Movie Awards	Most Promising Actress	Nominated	
2014	2014 City People Entertainment Awards	Most Promising Act of the Year	Nominated	
