= Wole Ojo =

Nigerian actor (born 1984)

- Born: 6 June 1984 (age 41); Benin City, Nigeria
- Education: University of Lagos
- Occupation: Actor
- Notable work: The Child

Wole Ojo (born 6 June 1984) is a Nigerian actor. He gained prominence in 2009 after winning the fourth edition of the Amstel Malta Box Office reality television show.

== Education ==
He has a bachelor's degree in creative arts from University of Lagos.

== Filmography ==
Year	Film	Role	Notes
2011	Maami	Kashimawo	Drama
2012	When Fishes Drown	Tony	Drama
2013	Conversations at Dinner	Chidi Obi	Drama
2014	Umbara Point	Jelani	Thriller
2014	Perfect Union	Steve Kadiri	Drama
2014	Brave	Nathan Doga	Short film
2015	The MatchMaker	Bryan	romantic drama film
2015	Out of Luck	Seun	Drama
2015	7 Inch Curve	Kamani	Drama
2016	Beyond Blood		romantic drama film
2016	Entreat	Segun Adeoye	romantic drama film
2018	Bachelor's Eve	Uche	Drama
2019	Coming From Insanity	Femi Martins	Drama
2020	Abeke	Aderoju	Drama
2021	Blinded	kelechi	Drama
2022	cold Furnace	Bryan	Drama
2023	Sibe	Benjamin	TV series
2023	Trigger	Jidenna	Drama
2024	Cellmate	Pastor Jude	Drama

== Accolades ==
Year	Awards	Category	Recipient	Result
2010	6th Africa Movie Academy Awards	Most Promising Actor	The Child	Nominated
2014	City People Entertainment Awards	Best New Actor (Yoruba)		Nominated
2013	2013 Nollywood Movies Awards	Best Actor (Indigenous)	Maami	Nominated
2015	2015 Africa Magic Viewers Choice Awards	Best Actor in a Drama	Brave	Nominated
2015	2015 Nigeria Entertainment Awards	Actor of the Year (Nollywood)	Brave	Nominated

== See also ==
- List of Nigerian actors
