= Brave (2014 film) =

- Release poster on irokotv
- Directed by: LowlaDee
- Screenplay by: LowlaDee
- Starring: Adesua Etomi; Wole Ojo; Diana Yekini
- Production company: Lowladee Signature Films
- Release date: 26 April 2014
- Running time: 31 minutes
- Country: Nigeria

Brave is a 2014 Nigerian short film directed by LowlaDee with Adesua Etomi and Wole Ojo in lead roles. The film is loosely inspired from a "Page 88" in The Lady, Her Lover & Her Lord by American author, T.D Jakes. The film tells a story of a young couple whose marriage came crumbling when the husband is diagnosed with flaccid paralysis after an accident. It was released on irokotv in 2014. It received generally positive reviews for its powerful interpretation in conveying important messages upon release, also getting nominated and winning awards.

== Cast ==
- Adesua Etomi as Layomi Doga
- Wole Ojo as Nathan Doga
- Patience Mohie as Layo's mum
- Funmi Sobayo as Kiki Doga
- Diana Yekini as Tammy
- Gbenga Kayode as Johnny
- Bisola Akintunde as Shawarma Salesgirl
- Ruby Dede as Layo's Client

== Plot ==
In 2006, based in Lagos, Nathan Doga (Wole Ojo) and Layo Doga (Adesua Etomi) are still expectant of their first child after two years of marriage.

Nathan consoles Layo, who seems unhappy and incomplete without a child. On getting to work, Tammy (Diana Yekini) tries to persuade Layo to freely get a design for a wedding. Nathan calls Layo at work after being inspired from a quotation in his Bible that speaks about "two people agreeing on earth", explaining his interpretation to Layo as being, if they can have sex tonight the heavens will bless them with a child. After two weeks of the scripture-inspired sex, Layo begins showing symptoms of pregnancy, and gets a confirmation from medics. She informs her mum (Patience Mohie), making her promise not to tell her husband until their anniversary in a few days. On their way back home from an outing, Layo asks Nathan, who is driving, if he thinks their relationship will remain strong when they approach old age. Nathan replies amusedly that it will be better. This is shortly before his car is run over by another vehicle.

Four years have passed since the accident. Nathan uses a wheelchair. Layo tries to come to terms with the new reality of being married to a disabled person. Nathan explains how his career got tarnished after the incident. Layo in a counter argument narrates how she has given her all for him for four years and how she wants to "live her life again". Nathan's aim of consoling her by stating that his condition is only temporary turns futile. Just before leaving in November 2010, Layo informs Nathan of the baby she was carrying four years ago and how they didn't only lose their baby but also their home. She dropped her wedding ring with Nathan on the floor calling for her return, and returned to her parents' home. Nathan's blood pressure has been on the increase since the absence of his Layo. Medical officers who examined him at his home, noted that he's facing both medical and psychological traumas since she left. It's been a month since Layo left her matrimonial home, her mum tries to persuade her to ask after the well-being of her husband, but she refuses. Nathan's sister caters for him in the absence of his wife and encourages him to get his life together by reminding him of the memories from their parents and how he's the only family she's had left. Tammy speaks to Layo that she understands why she needed to make that decision. After arriving home at midnight, Layo gets into a fight with her mum over her continued neglect of her husband. Layo discloses that she spoke with his sister so she knows he'd in good hands and request that if her mum was so concerned on his welfare, she should move in with him since she knows he's an orphan. Layo's mum asks her to ponder if she loves his body or his soul. She also told her to reflect on the reaction of Nathan if she was the one on the wheelchair. After a sober reflection on the issues raised by her mum, Layo admiration for her husband began to be reignited. Layo meets her spiritual mentor and explained her fears and challenges to her who encouraged her saying that "Your mother is right but permit me to add somethings she left out, I have learnt that love always come at a cost that only the BRAVE can pay for, this is beyond you. You cannot love this man by your own strength, you will always go weary, you see God is love and when you truly have him you have the capacity to love unconditionally without fear or compromise, the kind of love that have the capacity to change everything". Layo reconciles with Nathan, who accepts her back immediately. Nathan goes through series of therapy with his wife and sister to make him walk again.

== Reception ==
=== Critical reception ===
Sodas and Popcorn praised the chemistry of the lead acts. Describing Etomi as a "fresh and welcome face in the industry". She went further to state that the chemistry between her and Wole was a major plus to the film. On the directing, LowlaDee was praised for giving a good example on how optimal results can be gotten from limited resources. It concluded its review by saying the film conveyed a strong message in the simplest form and wanted it to be longer.

Connect Nigeria recommended the film, stating that it isn't often to find a film with a "clear cut and inspiring message" as Brave does. Godrick Adora Ruby from Covenant University rated the film 9 out of 10, "describing the set, pacing and dialogue as impressive". She also praised the simplistic nature of the length of the film. The acting of Etomi and Wole was also seen as stellar performances in the film.

=== Accolades ===
List of Major Awards
Award	Category	Recipients and nominees	Result
MultiChoice (2015 Africa Magic Viewers Choice Awards)	Best Short Film	LowlaDee	Nominated
Best of Nollywood Awards (2014 Best of Nollywood Awards)	Best Short Film	LowlaDee	Won
2015 Nigeria Entertainment Awards	Best Director	LowlaDee	Nominated
