= Sincerely Daisy =

2020 Kenyan coming-of-age romantic comedy film by Nick Mutuma

- Directed by: Nick Mutuma
- Screenplay by: Natasha Likimani
- Produced by: Nick Mutuma
- Starring: Ellah Maina; Brian Abejah; Sam Psenjen; Mbeki Mwalimu
- Music by: Timothy Rimbui
- Production company: Giraffe Africa Productions
- Distributed by: Netflix
- Release date: 9 October 2020
- Running time: 87 minutes
- Country: Kenya
- Language: English

Sincerely Daisy is a 2020 Kenyan coming-of-age romantic comedy film produced and directed by actor Nick Mutuma. The film stars Ellah Maina, Brian Abejah, Sam Psenjen, and Mbeki Mwalimu in the lead roles.

It premiered on Netflix on 9 October 2020, becoming the first-ever Kenyan feature film to be released on the platform. It was the second Kenyan production overall to appear on Netflix, following the short film Poacher.

The film garnered significant attention and anticipation following the release of its trailer on 2 September 2020.

== Plot ==
The film follows Daisy, a cheerful high school graduate whose dreams, aspirations, and self-confidence are challenged by unexpected family and romantic turmoil.

== Cast ==
- Ellah Maina as Daisy
- Brian Abejah as Collo
- Sam Psenjen as Fred
- James Webbo
- Serah Wanjiru as Amina
- Francis Ouma as Kyalo Mistari
- Kagambi Nass
- Mbeki Mwalimu as Wendy
- Foi Wambui as Lisa
- Muthoni Gathecha
- Jackie Matubia as Nancy

== Production ==
Principal photography began in November 2019. Sincerely Daisy marked the second directorial effort by Nick Mutuma, produced by Naomi Mburuh. The film was produced as part of The Next Superstar, a popular Kenyan talent competition, and many of the contestants from the show were cast in the film. Filming was completed in just seven days. The soundtrack was composed by Kenyan music producer Timothy Rimbui.

== See also ==
- List of Kenyan films
