= Nzioka Waita =

Kenyan advocate (born 1975)

Nzioka Siwadie Waita C.B.S.
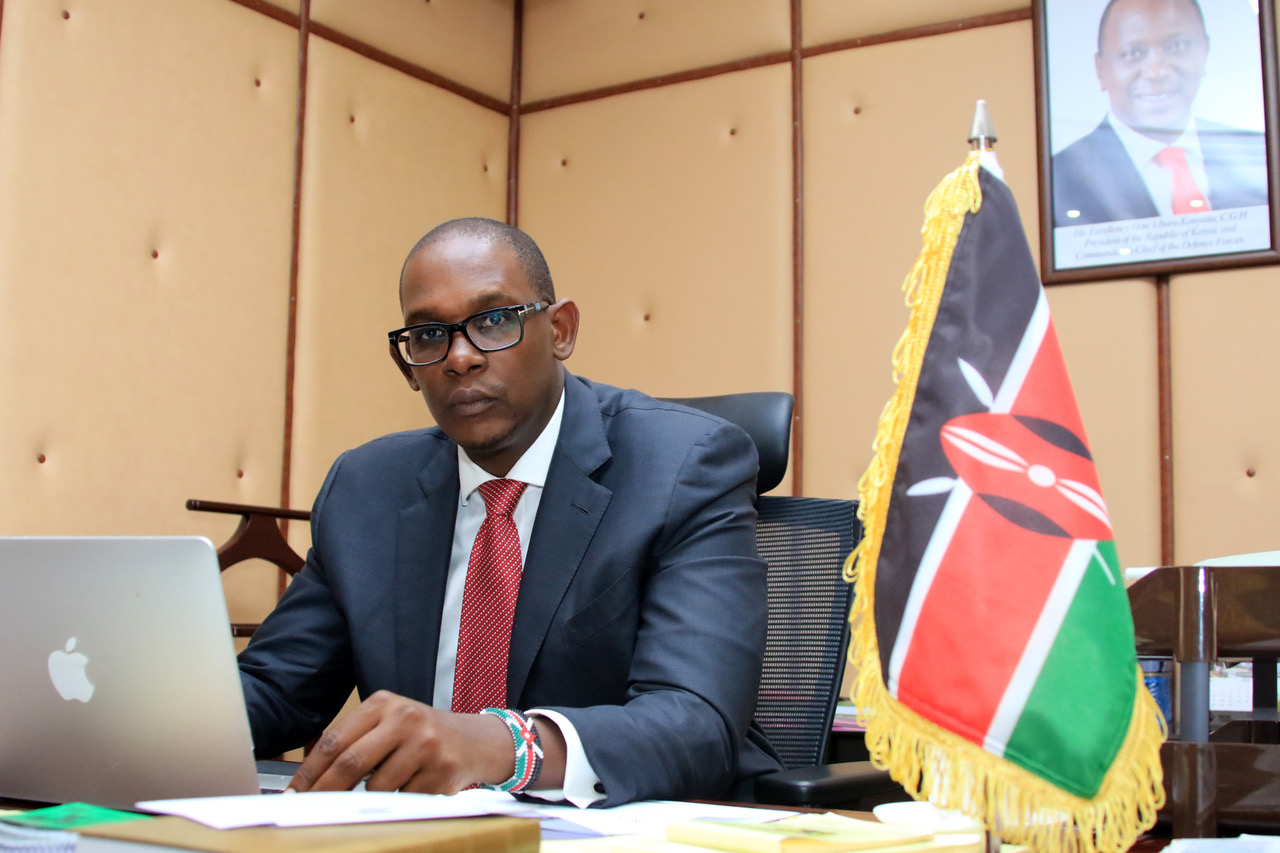
- Nzioka Waita at his State House, Nairobi office

2nd State House Chief of Staff and Head of the Presidential Delivery Unit
- In office 5 January 2018 – 9 February 2022
- Preceded by: Joseph Kinyua

Deputy Chief of Staff and Deputy Head of the Public Service
- In office 11 March 2016 – 5 January 2018
- Succeeded by: Njee Muturi (Deputy Chief of Staff - Parliamentary Affairs)
- Succeeded by: Ruth Kagia (Deputy Chief of Staff - Strategy and Policy)
- Succeeded by: Wanyama Musiambo (Deputy Head of the Public Service)

Personal details
- Born: 24 October 1975 (age 50) Nairobi, Kenya
- Children: 1
- Education: University of Sheffield ((LLB)) Queen Mary University of London ((LLM))
- Website: The Presidency

Nzioka Siwadie Waita (born 24 October 1975) is a Kenyan advocate who has served as the 2nd Chief of Staff of Kenya's State House and Head of Kenya's Presidential Delivery Unit between 5 January 2018 and 2022. He succeeded Joseph Kinyua, who is Kenya's Head of Public Service, at the start of the 2nd term of President Uhuru Kenyatta of the Republic of Kenya. Prior to this appointment, Waita served in the capacity of Deputy Chief of Staff and Deputy Head of the Public Service, deputising Joseph Kinyua in both capacities. And prior to this he served as Secretary, President’s Delivery Unit.

Nzioka is an Advocate of the High Court of Kenya of 18 years standing, a Certified Public Secretary and a member of the Law Society of Kenya (LSK). He holds a Bachelor of Laws (LLB) degree from the University of Sheffield and a Masters (LLM) in IT and Communications Law from Queen Mary University of London both obtained in the United Kingdom.

== Early life ==
Waita was born on 24 October 1975, in Nairobi, Kenya. He is one of four children of Mary Bebi Waita and the late Raphael Mwangangi Waita.

== Education ==
He was raised in a devout Catholic family and spent most of his formative years in the prestigious Catholic school, Saint Mary’s between 1982-1989 for his primary school, 1990-1993 Nairobi School O-levels and later between the years 1994-1995 for his International Baccalaureate.

Waita attended the University of Sheffield between the years 1996 – 1999, where he was an active member of both the Afro-Caribbean and the Kenyan Student Societies. Waita graduated from the University of Sheffield with a Bachelor of Laws (LLB). After graduation, Waita returned to Kenya where he started his career as a legal apprentice for one of Kenya’s top tier law firms Daly & Figgis (now Daly & Inamdar Advocates).

Later on in his working career, Waita enrolled in graduate school to further his education, graduating from Queen Mary University of London in 2015 with a Masters, (LLM) in Computer & Communications Law.

== Career ==
Nzioka Waita joined Safaricom in 2001 and thereafter rose steadily through the ranks to serve the company in various capacities. Between 2003-2015 Waita was a founding Trustee of the Safaricom Foundation and served in that capacity for 11 years. The trust was established by Trust Deed in August 2003. Waita has held various other positions within the ICT environment including serving as the company secretary of the international fibre optic company TEAMS Limited.

=== Public Service ===
On 17 April 2015, President Uhuru Kenyatta appointed Waita as the Secretary of Delivery in the Executive Office of the President. He was tasked to create a strong development delivery office that would give the President line of sight to his administration’s key development projects and programs. On 11 March 2016 Waita was appointed to the role of Deputy Chief of Staff and Deputy Head of the Public Service. In this capacity, he was in charge of the President’s Delivery Unit, Office of Budget Management, Performance Contracting and Oversight Office and State Corporations Oversight Office.

Following the re-election of President Uhuru Kenyatta on October 26, 2017, President Uhuru Kenyatta reorganised his executive office and promoted Waita to Chief of staff and Head of the President’s Delivery Unit on 5 January 2018.

== Personal life ==
Waita is married with one child. Waita is an amateur motorsports enthusiast and occasionally takes part in the Kenya National Rally Championship circuit. In July 2019, Waita participated in the World Rally Championship Candidate Event held in Kenya “ The Safari Rally” and finished 24th overall out of 60 starters.
