= Mother-in-Law (TV series) =

- Genre: Comedy, family drama
- Created by: Catherine Wamuyu
- Written by: Patrick Oketch; Eric Wainaina; Catherine Wamuyu; Naomi Kamau
- Directed by: Catherine Wamuyu; Patrick Oketch
- Creative director: Patrick Oketch
- Starring: Elizabeth Wanjiru; Peter Muriithi Maina; Naomi Kamau; Patrick Oketch; Curtis Wachira; John Githui; Jackie Mungai; Faith Nyaga; Arabron Nyyneque
- Country of origin: Kenya
- Original languages: English; Kiswahili
- No. of seasons: 15

Production
- Executive producers: Wachira Waruru; Latifa Ngunjiri
- Producers: Catherine Wamuyu; Shelmith Wangu; Patrick Oketch; Naomi Kamau
- Production location: Nairobi
- Camera setup: Multi-camera setup
- Running time: 24 – 30 minutes (Including commercial breaks)
- Production company: Citizen TV

Original release
- Network: Citizen TV
- Release: 2008

Mother-in-Law is a Kenyan television comedy and family drama that premiered in 2008 on Citizen TV. It revolves around the family of Charity Mwamba Mother-in-Law is a weekly drama series that has been aired since 2008 on Kenya's Citizen TV. The family drama is divided into episodes, with each seemingly addressing a bundle of unique familial issues.

== Overview ==
The television series is set in a contemporary Kenyan middle-class household, portraying the dynamics of a typical family. The narrative centers on the interactions of a mother-in-law with her husband, children, daughters-in-law, and grandchildren.The show explores how these relationships affect other family members and incorporates a range of characters, including domestic workers, extended family, police, and politicians, to highlight various conflicts and reinforce the central themes. Its primary focus is to depict the real-life tensions and challenges often experienced between daughters-in-law and mothers-in-law.

== Characters ==
Elizabeth Wanjiru as Charity Mwamba the titular Mother-in-Law. Mother to Jack, Charlie, Robert and Betty. She's an old Septegenerian who wants things done her way and is in running arguments with her daughters-in-law, more so Alison.

Peter Muriithi as Eddie Mwamba husband to Charity and the voice of reason in the drama. Usually acts as Charity's leash when she gets overboard.

Faith Nyaga as Lisa wife to Robert daughter-in-law to Charity.

Arabron Nyyneque/Osenya as Jack Mwamba father to Tina Aggie and Mike.

Naomi Kamau as Alison daughter-in-law to Charity Mwamba mother to Tina Aggie and Mike.

Jackie Mungai as Tina daughter of Jack and Alison wife to Rasta.

John Githu as Ras husband to Tina living in Nairobi's suburbs of Kosovo.

Curtis Wachira as Mike son to Alison and Jack.

Patrick Oketch as Charlie Mwamba son to Charity Mwamba and Eddie Mwamba, brother of Jack, Robert and Betty; an on and off alcoholic who reverts to alcohol as soon as he gets sober.

Maggie Karanja as Betty daughter of Charity and Eddie Mwamba. She has one son called Alpha.

Catherine Kamau as Celina estranged wife to Charlie, who had an affair with a Senator.

== Reception ==
The series has been called one "of the most entertaining TV shows produced in Kenya".
