= Abel Mutua =

Kenyan actor, scriptwriter, content creator and entrepreneur

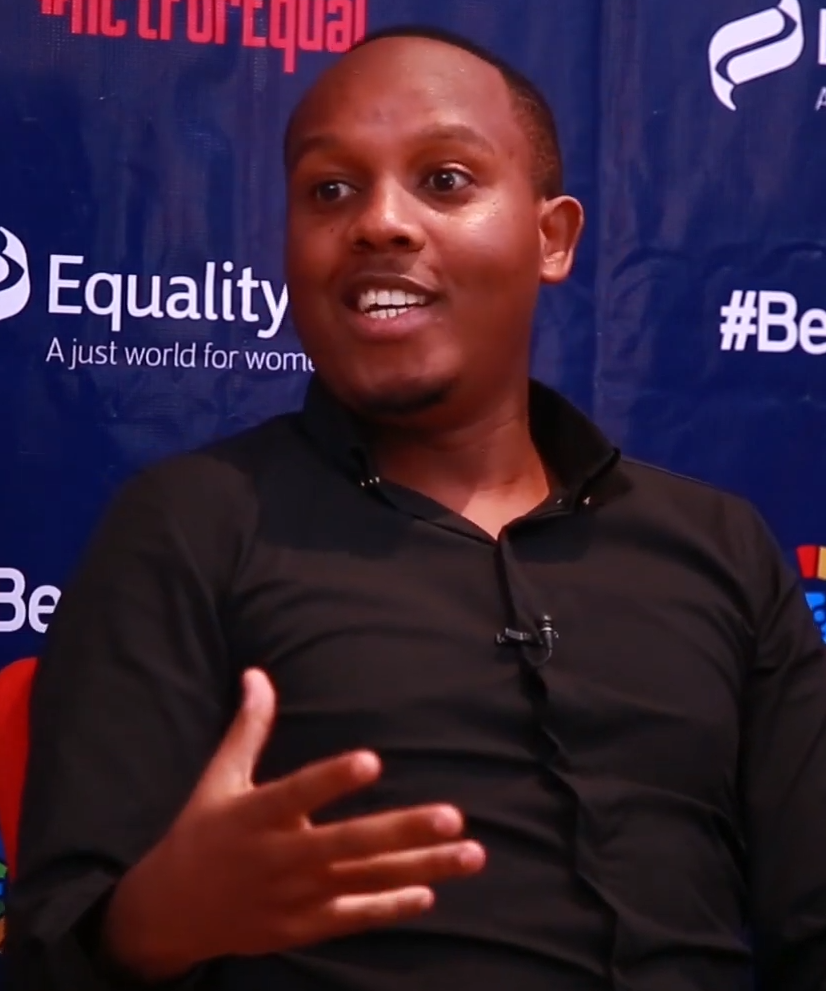
- Mutua in 2021
- Born: Abel Mutua Musyoka; 28 August 1986 (age 40); Nairobi, Kenya
- Other name: Mkurugenzi
- Citizenship: Kenya
- Education: Kenya Institute of Mass Communication
- Occupations: actor; script writer; content creator; entrepreneur; voice over artist
- Years active: 2007-present
- Organization: Phil-It Production
- Known for: Tahidi High
- Spouse: Judy Nyawira
- Children: 1
- Website: https://www.philittv.com/

Abel Mutua or Mkurungenzi (born August 28, 1986) is a Kenyan actor, scriptwriter, content creator and entrepreneur. He rose to popularity as an actor on Tahidi High. He co-founded Phil-It Productions, with his creative partner Philip Karanja. Mutua co-created, wrote, and acted in the hit comedy-drama series The Real Househelps of Kawangware (2014), Sue na Jonnie (2017), and Hullabaloo Estate (2018). His 2022 feature film Click Click Bang debuted on Netflix and became one of Kenya's highest-grossing independent film releases.

== Career ==
Abel rose to popularity playing Freddie, on the Kenyan TV show Tahidi High, which aired on Citizen TV. Abel was also the scriptwriter of the TV show The Real Househelps of Kawangware, which aired on KTN. In 2016, he exited the show.

Abel wrote the film, Grand Little Lie, which was initially released on the Phil-It Productions website and screened in select Nairobi cinemas in 2021. In 2024, the film debuted on Netflix. He also wrote the film Click Click Bang, which launched in July 2022 at the Nairobi Cinema Hall. In October 2023, the film debuted on Netflix.

On February 14, 2024, Abel held the men's conference, to address gender-based violence, against women. In 2024, Abel wrote dramedy, Untying Kantai, which premiered on Showmax on 9 May. He also wrote the film Makosa Ni Yangu, which premiered on the Phil-It website, in 2024. In 2024, Abel's podcast, The Mkurugenzi Podcast, was the third most listened podcast in Kenya on Spotify.

== Awards and recognition ==
In 2018, Abel was honored at the Young Entrepreneurs Awards.

In 2025, was nominated for Best Writing TV Series category, for dramedy, Untying Kantai at Africa Magic Viewers’ Choice Awards.

== Personal life ==
In 2015, Abel married Judy Nyawira. Together, they share one daughter, Mumbua.
