= Africa Digital Awards =

Africa Digital Awards is an annual digital event that celebrates, recognizes and rewards digital players in Africa. The Awards recognize digital creators and developers while celebrating users in digital finance, social media, Mobile, Agritech, Media, Telecommunications, esports etc.
