= Elizabeth Lenjo =

Kenyan lawyer

- Born: Kenya
- Citizenship: Kenyan
- Education: Catholic University of Eastern Africa (Bachelor of Laws); Kenya School of Law (Advocates Training Program); University of Turin Department of Law (Master of Laws)
- Occupations: Lawyer, corporate executive
- Years active: 2011–present
- Title: Intellectual property & entertainment attorney

Elizabeth Lenjo is a Kenyan lawyer and the chair of the Kenya Copyright Tribunal. She also sits on the board of Kenya's Nuclear Power and Energy Agency.

== Background and education ==
Lenjo was born in Kenya, June 19, 1986. After attending local primary and secondary schools, she was admitted to the Catholic University of Eastern Africa, graduating in 2009 with a Bachelor of Laws degree. After attending the Advocates Training Program at the Kenya School of Law, she was admitted to the Kenyan bar.

In 2016, she was one of the 40 applicants admitted to the Master of Laws degree course at the University of Turin in Italy, specializing in intellectual property law. The course is administered by the University of Turin Department of Law in conjunction with the World Intellectual Property Organization. She graduated in 2017.

She holds certificates in intellectual property law, mediation, arbitration and related subjects from WIPO and Harvard University. She also has a certificate in fashion law, obtained from Fordham University School of Law in New York City.

== Career ==
Lenjo is a lawyer, advocate of the High Court of Kenya, and expert in the areas of intellectual property law, media law, and entertainment law. She is a practitioner of arbitration and alternative dispute resolution.

After practicing solo for nearly six years, Lenjo co-founded Kikao Law Firm with legal partner Sarah Ochwada, who specializes in sports and entertainment law. After disbanding Kikao Law, she now heads MyIP, a boutique Law firm.

Lenjo lectured at Strathmore University, teaching media law and ethics at the university's school of law and teaching business law at the university's school of mathematics.

She was appointed to chair the C Kenyaopyright Tribunal by Chief Justice Hon. Martha Koome, She also sits on the board of the Nuclear Power and Energy Agency.

== Family ==
Lenjo is married to Al Kags, and they have two children.

== Other considerations ==
In September 2018, Business Daily Africa, a Kenyan, English language, daily newspaper, named Lenjo among the "Top 40 Under 40 Women in Kenya in 2018".
