= Mogotio Constituency =

Electoral constituency in Baringo County, Kenya

Mogotio
- constituency for the Parliament of Kenya
- Mogotio Constituency within Baringo County

- Baringo County within Kenya
- County: Baringo
- Population: 91,104
- Area: 1,375 km^{2} (530.9 sq mi)

Current constituency
- Number of members: 1
- Party: UDA
- Member of Parliament: Reuben Kiborek Kipngor
- Wards: 3

Mogotio Constituency is an electoral constituency in Baringo County, Kenya. It is one of six constituencies in the county and was one of two constituencies of the former Koibatek District. It was established before the 1997 elections. There are 12 wards, all electing councillors for the Koibatek County Council. It is home to notable politicians like Hon. Jacob Kiprotich Cheboiwo, who is the current Member of county assembly for Kisanana.

== Members of Parliament ==
Elections	MP	Party	Notes
1997	William Cheruiyot Morogo	KANU	
2002	Joseph Kipkapto Korir	KANU	
2007	Prof Hellen Sambili	UDM	
2012	Prof Hellen Sambili	KANU	
2017	Dr Daniel Tuitoek	JP	
2022	Reuben Kiborek	UDA	
2027	Not Available	Null	

== Wards ==
Wards
Ward	Registered Voters
Mogotio	17,642
Emining	10,844
Kisanana	10,436
Total	38,922
*April 2022.

|
