= Multimedia University of Kenya =

University in Kenya

- Motto: Riding on Technology, inspiring innovation
- Type: Public
- Established: 1948 Central Training School Granted fully fledged university status in March 2013
- Chancellor: Catherine Kimura
- Vice-Chancellor: Rosebella Maranga
- Students: 3,610
- Location: Nairobi, Kenya
- Campus: Urban
- Website: www.mmu.ac.ke

The Multimedia University of Kenya (MMU) is a public University. It is located along Magadi Road, in Karen Ward, Langata sub-county, Nairobi County. The campus is approximately 20-25km South West of Nairobi CBD and about 2km from Ongata Rongai town. It is next to Nairobi national Park. The university offers IT & related courses, Mass media, Business, Engineering, Physical Sciences (Physics and Chemistry) and Social sciences education.

== Campus ==
The university has two campuses:

- The main campus is located near the western side of the Nairobi National Park on Magadi Road in Nairobi. It has a telecommunications museum and several residential halls.
- The second campus is located in the Nairobi Central Business District, in Uniafric House on Loita Street.

== History ==
MMU was founded in 1948 when the institution was founded as Central Training School to serve as East African Post Training School before changing to Kenya Posts and Telecommunications Corporation (KPTC). This was after the collapse of the East African community in 1977. In 1992, the college was upgraded to Kenya College of Communications Technology under KPTC and later (1999) became a subsidiary of Telkom Kenya Ltd (TKL), after KPTC split into Postal Corporation of Kenya, Telkom Kenya Ltd and Communications Commission of Kenya (CCK). The college became a subsidiary of CCK after the privatization of TKL in 2006. In 2008, it was upgraded under Legal Notice No. 155 of 2008 to Multimedia University College of Kenya as a constituent college of Jomo Kenyatta University of Agriculture and Technology.

=== Award of charter ===
After an inspection conducted by the Commission for University Education, a body set aside by the Kenyan government to oversee the quality of higher education in the country, the immediate former president, Hon. Mwai Kibaki, granted a university charter to the college, thereby giving it university status on 1 March 2013. From then, the institution became known as the Multimedia University of Kenya.

== Academics ==
MMU courses include certificate, diploma, bachelor's degree and master's degree courses. Through its centre for further Education, the university offers short courses aimed at complementing the academic programmes being offered and offer students extra training.

The MMU academic calendar operates on two semesters that run from January to April and September to December.

=== Faculties ===
The six faculties of MMU are:-

- Faculty of Engineering and Technology
- Faculty of Computing and Information Technology
- Faculty of Media and Communication
- Faculty of Business and Economics
- Faculty of Science and Technology
- Faculty of Social Sciences and Technology

=== Library ===
The collection covers all programmes offered by the university, that is, Media and Communication, Engineering, ICT and Business programmes. The library conducts training on how to access the e-resources in the e-resources centre located within the library. The MMU library contains four sections: circulation services, technical services, collection development and e-resources centre.

=== ICT Museum ===
MMU has an ICT museum. The ICT museum is located in the main campus along Magadi road, and is open to the general public as well. It is actually the largest Ict museum in East and Central Africa.

== Vision 2030 Kenya ==
MMU is going to be involved in the development Konza Technology City. MMU Kenya has adopted a similar strategy as MMU Malaysia in which MMU Kenya is to accelerate the development of Kenya's Information and Knowledge sectors. This is one of the pillars meant to transform Kenya to a middle income economy under Vision 2030.

== Recognition ==
In 2012, MMU was recognized as the top ranking public university in Kenya in ICT excellence. It is also the training centre for the SAP Skills for Africa Program whose main purpose is to train African university graduates in software engineering.

== See also ==
- Joseph Gitile Naituli
- List of universities in Kenya
- Education in Kenya
