= Roslyne Akombe =

Kenyan politician (born 1976)

Roselyn Akombe
- Born: 1976 (age 49–50); Kenya
- Citizenship: Kenyan
- Education: University of Nairobi (Bachelor of Education); Rutgers University–Newark (Master of Science in Global Affairs) (Doctor of Philosophy)
- Occupations: Educator, Diplomat
- Years active: 2004 — present
- Known for: Management
- Title: Undersecretary at the United Nations Headquarters in New York City & Former Commissioner of the Independent Electoral and Boundaries Commission of Kenya
- Spouse: Onyonka

Roselyn Kwamboka Akombe (born 1976) is a Kenyan former commissioner of the Independent Electoral and Boundaries Commission (IEBC) of Kenya.

She became famous within the Kenyan media after appearing before the board that was interviewing potential appointees for the commission and said that she was ready to take her new position as a commissioner, although this would mean taking a pay cut of 70 percent from her previous job as an Under-Secretary at the United Nations. She argued that this was a sacrifice she was ready to make for her country. She became famous internationally after controversially resigning from her post as a commissioner on 18 October 2017 amidst a political crisis in Kenya.

Shortly after her resignation, she flew out of the country citing fears for her life within the prevailing political climate.

== Early life and education ==
She was born in 1976, in present-day Nyamira County, in what was then Nyanza Province, Kenya. She grew up and attended local primary and secondary schools. She obtained her first degree, a Bachelor of Education, from the University of Nairobi. Later, she obtained a Master of Science degree in Global Affairs, from Rutgers University–Newark, in the United States, followed by a Doctor of Philosophy, in the same subject, also from Rutgers University-Newark.

== Career ==
Akombe was employed as a senior adviser to the Under-Secretary General for political affairs at the United Nations Headquarters in New York City.

=== Tenure at IEBC ===
In January 2017, she was appointed as a commissioner at the IEBC, which intrigued the public when it became public knowledge that she would be taking a pay cut of 70 percent from her former job by working for the commission. She explained that this was a matter of patriotism to her country and that she had the desire to help the country run a free and fair election and wished to play a role in it. The media also reported that “She has been granted special leave without pay to serve in the Kenyan Independent Electoral and Boundaries Commission,” and that “she'll provide technical electoral support to the commission in preparation for the 2017 elections and support efforts to prevent post-electoral violence in Kenya.” By working with IEBC Akombe would not receive any salary as an employee of the UN. Akombe's basic salary as a commissioner of IEBC is estimated at KES 800,000 (about US$8000) per month.

Following her employment at IEBC, Roselyn instantly became the face of the commission, and was present in many press briefings given to the public. In fact, she was responsible for discharging many of these press conferences, in which she was noted as an eloquent and smooth talker. This made many people think that she was the deputy chair-person of the commission, although she was just a commissioner. According to the Kenya Daily Nation, Akombe is "a youthful, straight-talking and dreadlocked commissioner with high cheekbones who explained things with a ready smile." Her roles in the commission included training field officers, addressing press conferences, reporting to the chairman and CEO of the commission and taking other roles to ensure the credibility and fairness in Kenyan elections.

==== Resignation controversy ====
On 18 October 2017, Akombe resigned from her position as a commissioner of the IEBC during a time when the country was in a crisis following the Supreme Court nullification of the 2017 Kenyan Election Her decision almost plunged the largest East African Economy to constitutional crisis. On 1 September 2017, the Supreme Court of Kenya passed judgement that declared the 8 August 2017 Presidential Elections results null and void. The court ruled that the IEBC had failed to meet the requirements set within the constitution for a free and fair elections and ordered a repeat of the elections within 60 days.

As a consequence, IEBC set to conduct fresh elections and announced a new election date as 17 October 2017, and later pushed it to 26 October 2017. However, the opposition party National Super Alliance (NASA), under the leadership of Raila Amolo Odinga piled pressure on the commission, saying that it could not possibly conduct an election as currently constituted. This view was supported by all politicians affiliated with the NASA candidate, Raila Amolo Odinga, including his running-mate Kalonzo Musyoka. In fact, it led to the boycott by all members of parliament and senate from house sittings with the argument that they did not recognize President Uhuru Kenyatta as a legally elected president. However, that view was strongly opposed by Uhuru Kenyatta and all politicians affiliated with his Jubilee Party, arguing that Raila had not right to guide IEBC on its operations. The difference between these two protagonists led to what some have termed as a political crisis in Kenya.

Attempting to maintain a neutral ground, IEBC tried to hold meetings between the opposition and the government to no avail. In the days following the court ruling, Raila and his NASA party consistently issued ultimatums, which it termed as its irreducible minimums without which a free, fair and credible elections could not take place in Kenya. As IEBC came out to say that it could not meet these minimums, Raila Odinga stunned the country and the international community by saying that he had withdrawn from the repeat presidential race because the commission was incapable of giving Kenyan's a free, fair and credible election. This led to a political crisis in Kenya as Raila and his party agitated for a cancellation of the repeat elections on 26 October 2017, while Uhuru and his party pushed for the repeat election. In the wake of all this political turmoil, it became apparent that the commission was infiltrated by moles and operators from Jubilee party and NASA party and that it had been compromised. Among the suspected mole scheming with politicians was Roselyn Akombe

On 18 October 2017, Akombe confirmed these rumors when she resigned in her resignation letter that was published online.

==== Impacts on the repeat of Kenyan 2017 presidential elections ====
The Commissioner's resignation caused a media sensation. The fresh elections proceeded despite the fact that Raila Odinga, one of the key candidates, had withdrawn from the polls and had urged his supporters not to participate in voting. Uhuru Kenyatta was declared President and sworn in.
