= Robert Manne =

Australian political scientist

Robert Manne AO
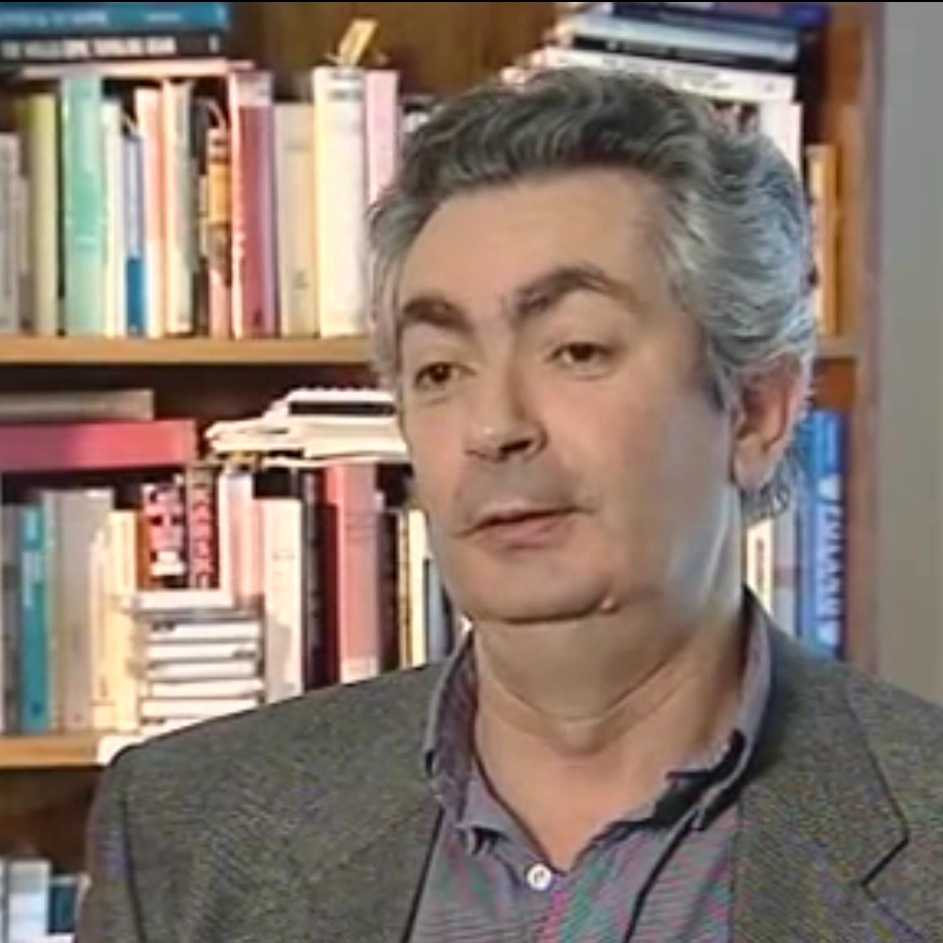
- Manne in a 2001 interview on ABC TV
- Born: 31 October 1947 (age 79); Melbourne, Victoria, Australia
- Education: University of Melbourne; University of Oxford
- Occupations: Academic; political lecturer
- Years active: 1970s–2012
- Spouse: Anne Robinson (m. 1983)
- Children: 2, including Kate Manne

Robert Michael Manne AO (born 31 October 1947) is an Emeritus Professor of Politics and Vice-Chancellor's Fellow at La Trobe University, Melbourne, Australia. He is a leading Australian public intellectual.

== Background ==
Robert Manne was born in Melbourne to parents who were Jewish refugees from Europe. His earliest political consciousness was shaped by this fact and that both sets of grandparents were victims of The Holocaust. He was educated at the University of Melbourne (1966–69) (BA) (Honours thesis 1969, "George Orwell: Socialist Pamphleteer") and the University of Oxford (BPhil). He joined La Trobe University in Melbourne in its early years. He served there as a professor in politics and culture until retirement in 2012. He is Vice-Chancellor's Fellow and Convenor of the Ideas and Society Program at La Trobe.

Since 1983, he has been married to journalist and social philosopher Anne Manne (née Robinson). He has two daughters, including Kate Manne, a philosopher and an associate professor at Cornell University.

== Contributions ==
Manne's broad interests include 20th-century European politics (including the Holocaust), Communism, and Australian politics. He has undertaken research in areas such as censorship, antisemitism, asylum seekers and mandatory detention, Australia's involvement in the Iraq War, the Stolen Generations, and the "history wars" of the 1990s.

Manne has aligned at various times within the Australian political scene from left to right, then back to left again; he titled a compendium of his political essays Left, Right, Left. Between 1989 and 1997 Manne edited the conservative magazine Quadrant, resigning when his editorial policies diverged from the views of the magazine's management committee. He had originally been appointed based on his previous anti-communist publications and his reputation as a conservative. Some people associated with Quadrant during his editorship believed that he was trying to push the magazine to the left. Since leaving the magazine, Manne has criticised it and the editors who came before—Peter Coleman and Roger Sandall, and after him—P. P. McGuinness and Keith Windschuttle.

In 1996 he published The Culture of Forgetting, which explored the controversy surrounding Helen Demidenko's 1994 Miles Franklin Award-winning novel about the Holocaust, The Hand That Signed the Paper.

Among Manne's other books are The New Conservatism in Australia (1982), In Denial: The Stolen Generations and the Right (2001), and Do Not Disturb (2005). He edited the 2003 anthology, Whitewash: On Keith Windschuttle's Fabrication of Aboriginal History, as a rebuttal to Keith Windschuttle's claims disputing there was genocide against Indigenous Australians and guerrilla warfare against British settlement on the continent. Contributors included Henry A. Reynolds, who writes on frontier conflict; and Lyndall Ryan, whose book The Aboriginal Tasmanians is one of the main targets of Windschuttle's work.

Manne was Chairman of the editorial board of The Monthly, a national magazine of politics, society and the arts, from February 2006 until his resignation on 18 August 2011. He wanted to focus on his writing, "including a new blog to be published on The Monthly's website." Manne's departure as chairman resulted in the editorial board's dissolution, with Monthly editor Ben Naparstek announcing, "We're not going to have one any more." Manne's blog, entitled Left, Right, Left, had its first post on 12 September.

Manne is also Chair of the Australian Book Review, a board member of The Brisbane Institute, and a member of the board of the Stolen Generations Taskforce in Victoria.

== Honours ==
- Fellow of the Academy of the Social Sciences in Australia (1999).
- In 2005 he was voted Australia's leading public intellectual in a survey conducted by The Sydney Morning Herald.
- Festschrift volume: Tavan Gwenda (ed.). 2013. State of the Nation: Essays for Robert Manne. Melbourne: Black Inc.
- Shortlisted for the Melbourne Prize for Literature, 2012.
- API Top Australian Public Intellectuals (number 1)
- Officer of the Order of Australia, 2023 Australia Day Honours, for "distinguished service to tertiary education, to political and social commentary, to public affairs, and to the Indigenous community"

== Bibliography ==
=== Books ===
- Manne, Robert, ed. (1983). The New Conservatism in Australia. Melbourne: Oxford University Press.
- — (1987). The Petrov Affair: Politics and Espionage. Sydney: Pergamon Press.
- — (1989). Agent of Influence: The Life and Times of Wilfred Burchett. Mackenzie Institute for the Study of Terrorism, Revolution and Propaganda.
- Manne, Robert & J. Carroll, eds. (1992). Shutdown: The Failure of Economic Rationalism and How to Rescue Australia. Melbourne: Text Inc.
- Manne, R. (1994). The Shadow of 1917: Cold War Conflict in Australia. Text Pub. Co. ISBN 1-875847-03-0.
- Manne, R. (1996). The Culture of Forgetting: Helen Demidenko and the Holocaust. Melbourne: Text Inc. ISBN 1-875847-26-X.
- Manne, R. (1998). The Way We Live Now: Controversies of the 90's. Melbourne: Text Publishing.
- Manne, R., ed. (1999). The Australian Century: Political Struggle in the Building of a Nation. Melbourne: Text Publishing. ISBN 1-875847-21-9.
- Manne, R. (2001). The barren years: John Howard and Australian political culture. Melbourne: Text Publishing.
- Manne, R., ed. (2003). Whitewash. On Keith Windschuttle's Fabrication of Aboriginal History. Melbourne: Black Inc. Agenda. ISBN 0-9750769-0-6.
- Manne, R., ed. (2004). The Howard Years. Melbourne: Black Inc. / Schwartz Publishing.
- Manne, R., ed. (2005). Do Not Disturb: Is the Media Failing Australia?. Schwartz Publishing. ISBN 0-9750769-4-9.
- Manne, R. (2005). Left, Right, Left: Political Essays 1977–2005. Schwartz Publishing. ISBN 1-86395-142-3.
- Manne, R.; Beilharz, P., eds. (2006). Reflected Light: La Trobe Essays. Melbourne: Black Inc.
- Manne, R., ed. (2009). W. E. H. Stanner, The Dreaming and Other Essays. Melbourne: Black Inc. Agenda.
- Manne, R., ed. (2008). Dear Mr Rudd: Ideas for a Better Australia. Melbourne: Black Inc.
- Manne, R.; McKnight, D., eds. (2010). Goodbye to All That? On the Failure of Neo-Liberalism and the Urgency of Change. Melbourne: Black Inc. Agenda.
- Manne, R. (2011). Making Trouble: Essays Against the New Australian Complacency. Melbourne: Black Inc.
- Manne, R.; Feik, C., eds. (2012). The Words that Made Australia: How a Nation Came to Know Itself. Melbourne: Black Inc.
- Manne, R., ed. (2013). The Best Australian Essays 2013. Melbourne: Black Inc.
- Manne, R., ed. (2014). The Best Australian Essays 2014. Melbourne: Black Inc.
- Manne, R. (2015). Cypherpunk Revolutionary: On Julian Assange. Melbourne: Black Inc.
- Manne, R. (2016). The Mind of the Islamic State: Milestones Along the Road to Hell. Melbourne: Black Inc.
- Manne, R. (2018). On Borrowed Time. Melbourne: Black Inc.
- Manne, R. (2024). A Political Memoir: Intellectual Combat in the Cold War and the Culture Wars. Melbourne: La Trobe University Press.

Quarterly Essays

- QE01 In Denial: The Stolen Generations and the Right (2001) ISBN 978-1-86395-107-4
- QE13 Sending Them Home: Refugees and the New Politics of Indifference (2003) ISBN 978-1-86395-141-8 – With David Corlett
- QE43 Bad News: Murdoch's Australian and the Shaping of the Nation (2011) ISBN 978-1-86395-544-7

=== Essays and reporting ===
- Manne, Robert (December 1995). "A conversation with Ryszard Kapuscinski". Quadrant. 39 (12): 40–43.
- Manne, Robert (March 2006). "Little America: How John Howard has Changed Australia". The Monthly (10).
- Manne, Robert (March 2009). "Neo-Liberal Meltdown: The Response to the Prime Minister's Essay". The Monthly (43): 20–26.
- Manne, Robert (March 2011). "The Cypherpunk Revolutionary: Julian Assange". The Monthly (65). Archived from the original on 16 October 2015.
- Manne, Robert (August 2012). "A Dark Victory: How vested interests defeated climate science". The Monthly (81).
- Manne, Robert (November 2013). "Why Rupert Murdoch can't be Stopped: The political empire of the News Corp chairman". The Monthly (95).

=== Quadrant editorials ===
- Manne, Robert (July–August 1995). "Life and death on the slippery slope". Quadrant. 39 (7–8): 2–3.
- — (October 1995). "Whatever it takes". Quadrant. 39 (10): 2–3.
- — (May 1996). "The Keating collapse". Quadrant. 40 (5): 2–3.

=== Book reviews ===
Date	Review article	Work(s) reviewed
1995	Manne, Robert (December 1995). "November 1975 : character and crisis". Books. Quadrant. 39 (12): 83–86.	Kelly, Paul (1995). November 1975 : the inside story of Australia's greatest political crisis. St Leonards, NSW: Allen & Unwin.
