= Business Daily Africa =

English daily newspaper in Kenya

- Type: Daily business newspaper
- Owner: Nation Media Group
- Language: English
- Headquarters: Nairobi, Kenya
- Country: Kenya
- Sister newspapers: Daily Nation & The EastAfrican
- Website: businessdailyafrica.com

Business Daily Africa, commonly known as Business Daily, is an English-language daily business newspaper published in Kenya. The newspaper is published by Nation Media Group from its headquarters at Nation Centre on Kimathi Street in Nairobi, Kenya.

== See also ==
- Daily Nation
- The EastAfrican
- Taifa Leo
- Daily Monitor
- The Citizen
