= Deamer =

Deamer is a surname. Notable people with this surname include:

- Adrian Deamer (1922–2000), an Australian journalist and lawyer
- Clive Deamer (born 1961), an English drummer
- David W. Deamer (born 1939), an American biologist
- Dulcie Deamer (1890–1972), a New Zealand-Australian writer
- Keith Deamer Banwell (1917–1990), also known as "Tex Banwell", a British soldier
- Peggy Deamer (born 1950), an American architect
- Pierce H. Deamer Jr. (1907–1986), an American politician
- Sydney Deamer (1891–1962), an Australian journalist

== See also ==
- Dreamer (disambiguation)
