= Carole Mandi =

Kenyan publisher, entrepreneur and media personality

- Citizenship: Kenya
- Occupation: Publisher
- Known for: ownership of True Love, Drum and Home Living Magazines
- Website: Official Website

Carole Mandi is a Kenyan publisher, entrepreneur, newspaper columnist and media personality.

== Career ==
She is the publisher and owner of Carole Mandi Media which owns True Love, Drum and Home Living Magazines. True Love and Drum Magazines were previously published by South Africa's Media24 but Mandi successfully bid for the magazine franchises and took over the business in 2010. She is also a weekly lifestyle contributor for the Saturday and Sunday Nation.

For two years Mandi hosted Sebuleni, a weekly local lifestyle talk show on NTV before she transitioned to publishing business. Just recently, Mandi launched an initiative called 'Women of Influence' to celebrate International Women's Day.

== Background and education ==
Mandi developed interest in writing at an early age and while in high school, she was already writing letters to the editor. The trained teacher (literature and linguistics) continued writing for magazines at the university.

Her first job was an editorial assistant at a small publication for women but in 1995, she was employed by a mainstream media house in Kenya, Nation Media Group. But Mandi quit this job to raise her two young children in 2002.

In 2004, she became an editor with Media24 which then published True Love, Drum and Move magazines. When Media24 folded their business in Kenya, Mandi bid for the magazine franchises and took over in 2010 as publisher of True Love and Drum.

From their savings and debts, Mandi and her husband acquired the publishing license and established Carole Mandi Media Limited (CMML) in 2010. True Love relaunched in 2010 and Drum East Africa in January 2011. In December 2012, Carole Mandi Media launched a bi-monthly home, garden and lifestyle magazine Home & Living.

CMML’s brand True Love is a monthly lifestyle magazine which targets women aged between 25 and 35 and retails in Kenya, Tanzania, Uganda and Rwanda.

== Family ==
Mandi was born to a Tanzanian mother (now deceased) and a Luhya father known as Dick Aguda who is a former sports editor for Daily Nation. She is married.
