= Entitled: How Male Privilege Hurts Women =

2020 book by Kate Manne

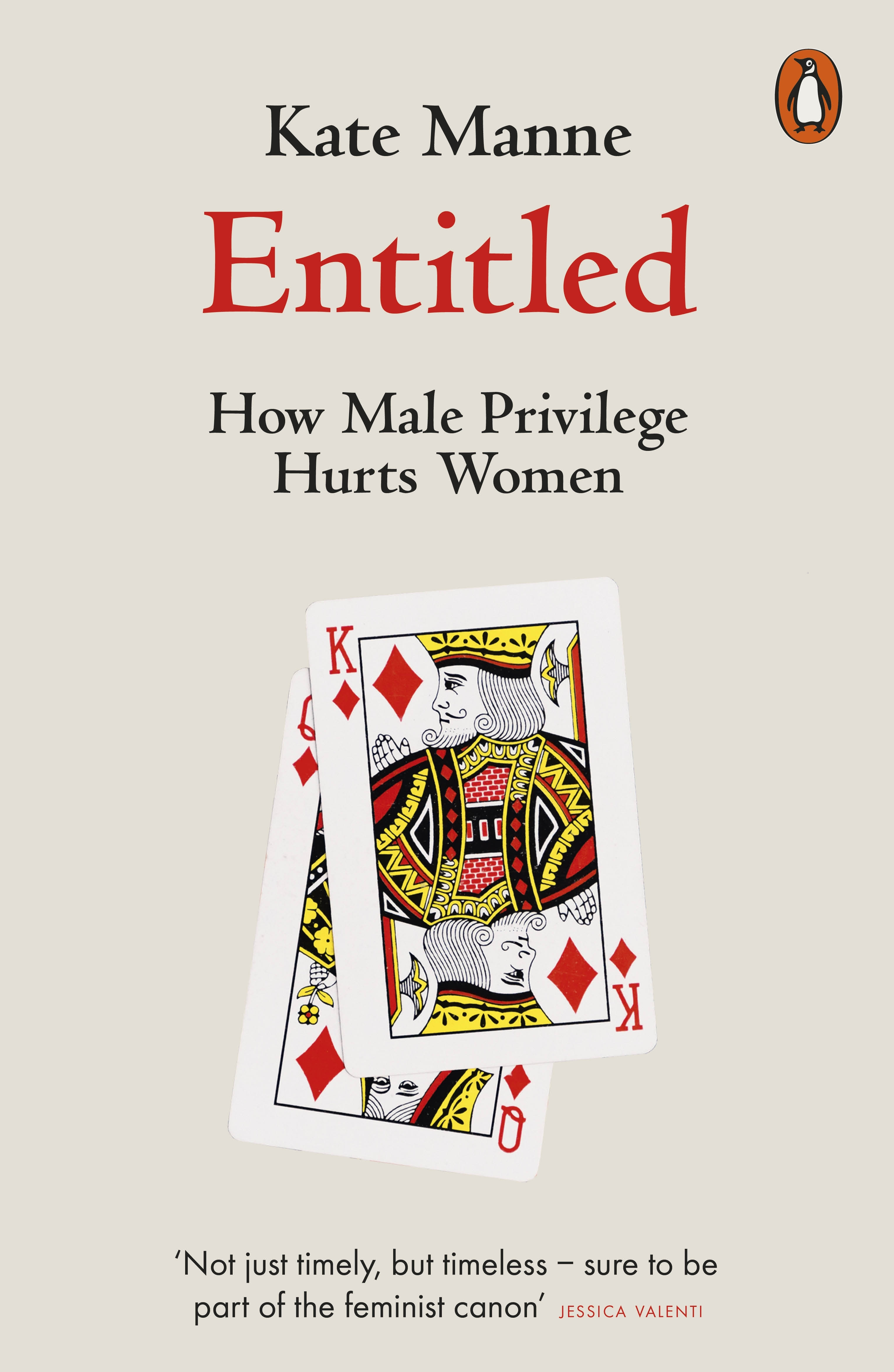
- Author: Kate Manne
- Subject: Analytic feminism
- Published: 2020 (Crown Publishing Group)
- ISBN: 9780141990743
- Preceded by: Down Girl: The Logic of Misogyny

Entitled: How Male Privilege Hurts Women is a 2020 book by feminist philosopher Kate Manne. The book explores the pervasive issue of male entitlement and its harmful consequences for women, offering a detailed analysis of how societal norms and systemic structures perpetuate gender inequality. It serves as Manne's second major work, following her acclaimed book Down Girl: The Logic of Misogyny.

== Overview ==
Manne argues that male entitlement extends beyond sexual expectations to include claims over admiration, care, bodily autonomy, knowledge, and power. This entitlement leads to widespread misogynistic behaviors, such as nagging, the neglect of women’s medical pain, mass shootings by incels, and the societal perception of women as “unelectable”. The book critiques toxic masculinity as a cultural phenomenon perpetuated not only by individual men but also by societal norms that condition everyone to uphold patriarchal values.

The book is divided into ten chapters. Manne illustrates these entitlements using real-world examples such as the Brett Kavanaugh hearings, the #MeToo movement (e.g., Harvey Weinstein), and cultural phenomena like “Cat Person”. She also addresses underexplored areas like entitlement to knowledge and medical care.

Manne emphasizes that combating toxic masculinity requires exposing flaws in societal thinking while empowering women to resist entitled attitudes. She advocates for a vision of equality where women are equally entitled to care, respect, and opportunities.

== Reception ==
Nesrine Malik of The Guardian praised its clarity and insight into male privilege as a moral framework that sustains patriarchy. For Times Higher Education Emma Rees commends Entitled for its incisive and accessible analysis of systemic misogyny, highlighting Kate Manne's ability to blend philosophical rigor with vivid real-world examples to expose male entitlement and its pervasive impact on women's lives, while offering a cautiously optimistic call to action. Anastasia Berg, writing for The Chronicle of Higher Education, criticized Kate Manne's interpretation of the incel phenomenon, arguing that portraying incels as enforcers of patriarchal norms oversimplifies their self-perception as victims of patriarchal hierarchies that exclude them. Berg also challenged Manne's conceptual link between mansplaining and violent misogyny, and likened her pessimistic stance - particularly her suggestion to avoid engaging with those of differing views - to the insular attitudes often found on incel forums.
