= Unshrinking =

2024 book by Kate Manne

Unshrinking: How to Face Fatphobia
- Author: Kate Manne
- Publisher: Crown
- Publication date: January 9, 2024
- Pages: 320
- ISBN: 978-0593593837
- Preceded by: Entitled: How Male Privilege Hurts Women

Unshrinking: How to Face Fatphobia is a 2024 book by philosopher Kate Manne. It was designated a finalist for the 2024 National Book Award for Nonfiction.

== Contents ==
The book combines scientific, medical, and sociological research on the phenomenon of fatphobia within society with Manne's own experiences tackling both fatphobia and misogyny during her childhood and adulthood, as well as during her rise to fame as a philosopher which heightened her fear of public perception. Additionally, it criticizes the position of fatphobia from numerous angles ranging from scientific consensus to philosophical arguments. While Manne has thought about and contended with such discrimination for most of her life, Manne stated that becoming a mother ultimately motivated her to quit dieting practices, confront eating disorders, and write her book.

Discussing the book on NPR, Manne said that she uses the word "fat" as a means of reclamation in order to shift the word's definition to mere description rather than an insult or pejorative: "I see the word 'fat' as describing one way of having a body that is part of natural, normal, and in fact, valuable human variation. And so I use it much like terms like 'short' and 'tall' and, for that matter, 'thin,' as a merely neutral description."

== Critical reception ==
Publishers Weekly called the book a passionate critique of fatphobia but felt that it was overextended, that Manne "understates the structural social justices", and that her argument "fails to convince." Kirkus Reviews called it a "brave, thought-provoking book" and stated that "With rigorous research and personal experience, Manne tackles and dismantles fatphobia in all its forms." In a starred review, Booklist called Manne's argument "unapologetic" and a "brilliant takedown of fatphobia" that served as an essential addition to the growing literature "on the experiences of fat people and fighting fatphobia."

Regan Penaluna, writing for the Chicago Review of Books, was compelled by Manne's deconstruction of fatphobia in its lack of rational, empirical basis while simultaneously deploying her own well-researched argument against it. Penaluna stated: "Manne dares us to reject racism, sexism, and capitalist greed as forces that shape our bodies and minds, and instead aspire to a world shaped by justice and kindness, one that fits all bodies. It's a profound challenge that is worth our time, as Manne makes clear in this superb book full of insight and hope."

Emmaline Clein, in a review for the Los Angeles Review of Books, lauded Manne's more philosophical aspects to her argument but named some criticisms with regard to her "individualist bent" to some parts of her book. Clein argued that Manne sometimes blamed possible victims of diet culture and didn't provide compassion to her bullies "who ... were probably hurting too, acting out of the terror and shame instilled in girls as soon as they become self-aware in this country."
