= Tanzania Media Service Act, 2016 =

Tanzanian law

The Government of United Republic of Tanzania has enacted four Acts concerning the control of freedom and regulation of media in the country. These are The Cybercrimes Act, 2015, The Statistics Act, 2013, The Media Services Act, 2016, and The Access to Information Act, 2015. The Government of the Republic of Tanzania on one side claims that the four Acts were highly needed to facilitate access to information and control the media sector. Political analysts, activists and normal people on the other side criticized that the Acts will negatively affect the freedom of media and eventually the freedom of speech of citizens. The Acts give the Minister responsible for information the power to ban any media which seems to report, publish, print or broadcast information contrary to the code of conducts or threaten peace in the state.

== Brief history ==
The Media Services Act, 2016, was enacted in 2016 by the Parliament of Tanzania on 5 November 2016 and signed by President John Pombe Magufuli two weeks later. The Act replaced the then restrictive Newspaper Act of 1976. The expectation of many people was that the Act would become an updated media law adhering to international conventions like the United Nations' Universal Declaration of Human Rights (UNDHR), East African Community Treaty, and other sources which affect the liberty of citizens to access information. Instead, the Acts appear to many to deprive certain civil constitutional rights like freedom of expression and freedom of getting information.

== Reaction from press ==
The Media Council of Tanzania (MCT), Legal and Human Right Centre (LHRC), and Tanzania Human Rights Defenders Coalition (HRDC) on 11 January 2017 filed a petition at the East African Court of Justice (EACJ) to challenge the newly passed Media Service Act, 2016. The petition, supported by a team of lawyers from MCT, LHRC and THRDC claims that the Act deprives civil liberties and access to information rights guaranteed under Article 18, subsections (a), (b), (c) and (d) of the Constitution of Tanzania, respectively addressing:

- Freedom of opinion and expression ideas;
- Right to seek, receive and, or disseminate information regardless of national boundaries;
- Freedom to communicate and a freedom with protection from interference;
- Right to be informed at all times of various important events of life and activities of the people and also of issues of importance to the society.

== East African Court of Justice decision ==
March 2019 delivered the judgement and ruled that some of the provisions of sections 7(3) (a), (b), (c), (f), (g), (h), (i) and (j) and section 19, 20, 21, 35, 36, 37, 38, 39, 40, 50, 52, 53, 54, 58 and 59 of the Media Services Act are in violation of the Articles 6(d), 7(2) and 8(1) of the Treaty for the Establishment of the East African Community.
