= Daily Nation =

Kenyan newspaper

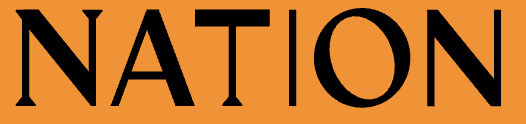
- Type: Daily newspaper
- Format: Berliner
- Owner: Nation Media Group
- Founder: Charles Hayes
- Publisher: Nation Media Group
- Editor-in-chief: Joe Ageyo
- Founded: 1958 as Taifa
- Language: English
- Headquarters: Nairobi, Kenya
- Country: Kenya
- Circulation: 170,000
- Sister newspapers: Taifa Leo
- ISSN: 1025-1227 (print); 1564-0256 (web)
- OCLC number: 2260098
- Website: nation.africa

The Daily Nation is a Kenyan daily newspaper based in Nairobi. It was founded in 1958 and is published by Nation Media Group.

It operates on a subscription model. On 8 February 2021, it implemented a paywall, requiring readers to pay for access to most of its online articles older than seven days.

== History ==
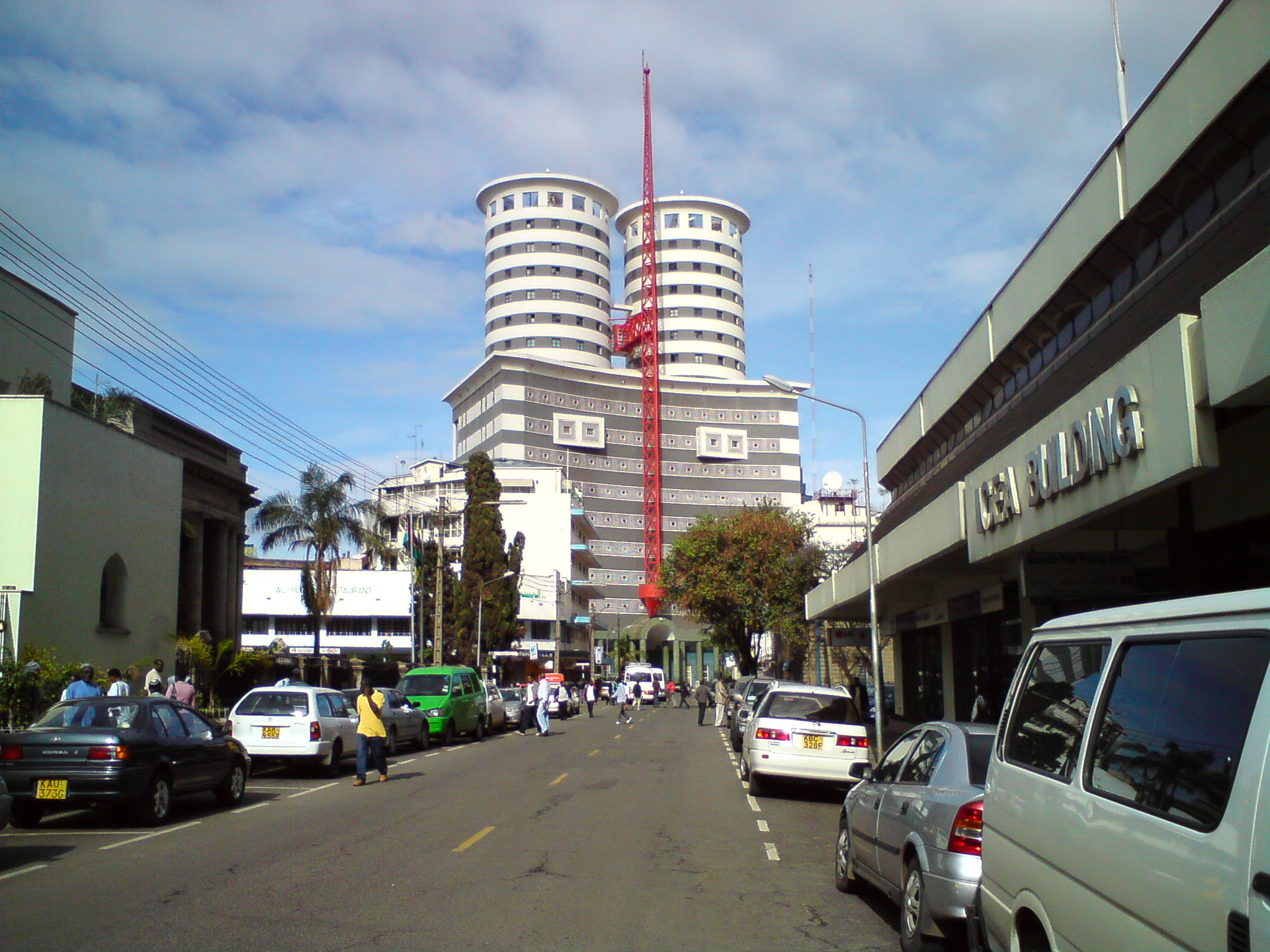
Nation Center, headquarters of the Nation Media Group who publish the Daily Nation

A predecessor to The Daily Nation was a Swahili weekly called Taifa by the Englishman Charles Hayes, founded in 1958. It was bought in 1959 by Prince Shah Karim al-Hussaini, Aga Khan IV and became a daily newspaper, Taifa Leo (Swahili for "Nation Today"), in January 1960.

An English-language edition called Daily Nation was published on 3 October 1960, in a process organised by former editor of the British News Chronicle, Michael Curtis.

The publisher was East African Newspapers (Nation Series) Ltd, which later became the Nation Media Group, with operations throughout the African Great Lakes region.

Goan Kenyan journalist Cyprian Fernandes worked at the Daily Nation and Sunday Nation from 1960 until he was forced to flee Kenya around 1973, owing to his investigative journalism probing irregularities which came too close to the government under Jomo Kenyatta, and his family was threatened. By that time he was chief reporter. He was one of the first Kenyan-born reporters at the paper.

Another well-known sports writer in the 1960s at the paper was Polly Fernandes.

== Headquarters ==
The newspaper was originally based at Nation House on Tom Mboya Street. It is now published from the Nation Media Group headquarters on Kimathi Street in Nairobi.

It is one of the leading newspapers in Kenya.

== Market share ==
The daily first turned a profit in 1968, and by 1970, was selling over 46,000 copies per issue.

The Daily Nation and its Sunday edition paper Sunday Nation had a market share of 53% in 2011. Their market share was 74% in 2013.

One of its main competitors in 2014 was The Standard, published by the Standard Group.

== Affiliated newspapers ==
- The Saturday Nation
- The Sunday Nation
- Business Daily Africa
- Taifa Leo, a Swahili-language newspaper, Kenya
- Daily Monitor, Uganda
- The Citizen, Tanzania
- The EastAfrican

== In film ==
A documentary film about the paper was released in 2000, directed by Dutch filmmakers Hillie Molenaar and Joop van Wijk.
