= Kate Manne =

Professor of philosophy

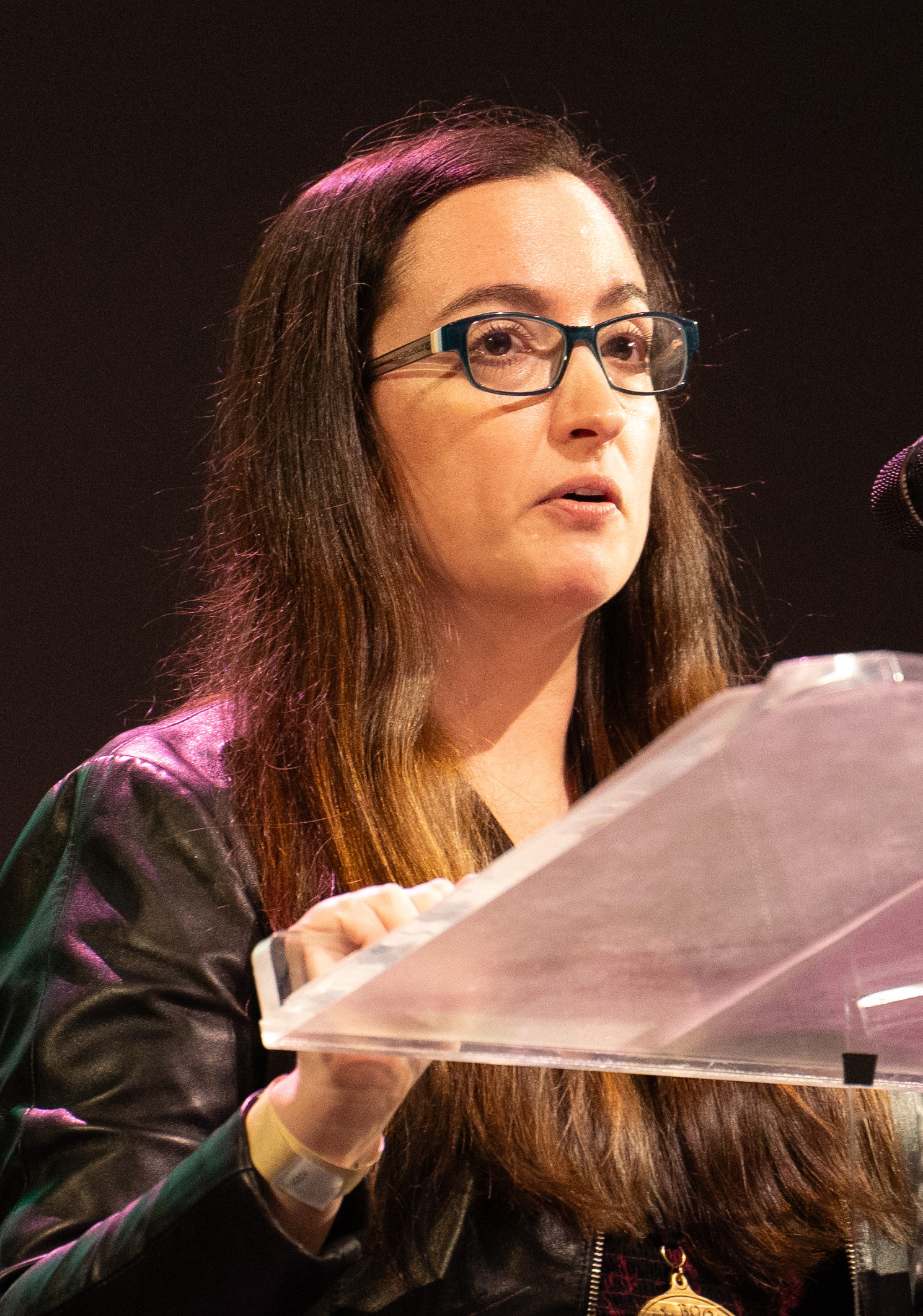

Academic background
- Education: Massachusetts Institute of Technology (PhD)
- Doctoral advisor: Sally Haslanger

Academic work
- Era: 21st-century philosophy
- School or tradition: Analytic feminism

Kate Alice Manne (born 1983) is an Australian philosopher, associate professor of philosophy at Cornell University, and author. Her work is primarily in feminist philosophy, moral philosophy, and social philosophy.

== Biography ==
=== Early life ===
Born in Australia in 1983, Manne grew up in Cottles Bridge, Victoria. Her father Robert Manne was a political science professor at La Trobe University, and her mother Anne Manne is an author.

=== Career ===
As an undergraduate, Manne studied philosophy, logic, and computer science, at the University of Melbourne (2001–2005), earning a BA (Honours) in philosophy. She received her PhD in philosophy from the Massachusetts Institute of Technology (2006–2011). Her dissertation, Not by reasons alone, argued in part that "the practical reason is not a suitable master concept in ethics, let alone the only ethical notion we need."

From 2011 to 2013, Manne was a junior fellow at the Harvard Society of Fellows. Since 2013, she has been at the Sage School of Philosophy, Cornell University, where she is an associate professor. Prospect Magazine named Manne one of the world's top 50 thinkers of 2019. On 16 May 2024, Manne and David Livingstone Smith of the University of New England were awarded the Lebowitz Prize by Phi Beta Kappa and the American Philosophical Association for an as yet unpublished presentation titled "Dehumanization and its Discontents".

== Philosophical work ==
Manne has written articles in ethics and metaethics, as well as three books, Down Girl: The Logic of Misogyny (2017), Entitled: How Male Privilege Hurts Women (2020), and Unshrinking: How to face Fatphobia (2024).

Down Girl proposes a distinction between sexism and misogyny. Manne argues that "sexism is an ideology that supports patriarchal social relations". Sexism, then, accepts gender roles, and helps to reinforce them, by making them seem as if they were natural or given arrangements. In essence, sexism is a belief system. Misogyny can be understood as an effort to control and punish women "who challenge male dominance". On this definition, misogyny is not necessarily about male hostility or hatred toward women, but more "the law enforcement branch of the patriarchy". According to Manne, "Misogyny is a way women are kept in (patriarchal) order, by imposing social costs for those breaking role or rank, and warning others not to." Manne coins the term "himpathy", which she defines as "the inappropriate and disproportionate sympathy powerful men often enjoy in cases of sexual assault, intimate partner violence, homicide and other misogynistic behavior".

Manne's second book, Entitled: How Male Privilege Hurts Women, explores male privilege. It proposes that male entitlement to sex, power, and knowledge has grave and deadly consequences for society at large and women more specifically. Nesrine Malik of The Guardian praised it, writing, "with perspicacity and clear, jargon-free language, Manne keeps elevating the discussion to show how male privilege isn't just about securing and hoarding spoils from women, but an entire moral framework." Writing for The Chronicle of Higher Education, Anastasia Berg criticized Manne for poorly interpreting the incel phenomenon. Berg argued that to claim that incels police the norms of the patriarchal order is "a gross simplification" since they perceive themselves as the victims of the patriarchal hierarchies that exclude them. Berg also questioned Manne's "perception of continuity from mansplainer to murderer" and compared her pessimism and her injunction not to bother trying to convince those who are not already "of a similar mind" to the attitudes expressed on incel forums.

Manne's 2024 book Unshrinking: How to Face Fatphobia is a history of the stigmatization of fat people in the workplace, at school, relationships, and in healthcare. It argues against a certain link between health and body weight, and focuses on stigma in doctors' offices. The book was long-listed for the National Book Award for Nonfiction.

== Selected publications ==
=== Books ===
- Manne, Kate (2017). Down Girl: The Logic of Misogyny. Oxford University Press. ISBN 978-0190604981.
- Manne, Kate (2020). Entitled: How Male Privilege Hurts Women. Penguin Random House. ISBN 9781984826558.
- Manne, Kate. (2024). Unshrinking: How to Face Fatphobia. Penguin Random House. ISBN 9780593593837

=== Articles ===
- "Melancholy Whiteness: Or, Shame-Faced in Shadows," Philosophy and Phenomenological Research, January 2018, Volume 96(1): 233–242.
- "Locating Morality: Moral Imperatives as Bodily Imperatives," Oxford Studies in Metaethics, Vol. 12, 2017, ed. Russ Shafer-Landau, Oxford: Oxford University Press.
- "Humanism: A Critique," Social Theory and Practice, April 2016, Volume 42(2): 389–415.
- "Democratizing Humeanism," in Weighing Reasons, eds. Barry Maguire and Errol Lord, New York: Oxford University Press, 2016.
- "Tempered Internalism and the Participatory Stance," in Motivational Internalism, eds. Gunnar Björnsson, Caj Strandberg, Ragnar Francén Olinder, John Eriksson, and Fredrik Björklund, Oxford: Oxford University Press, 2015.
- "Disagreeing about How to Disagree," with David Sobel, Philosophical Studies, April 2014, Volume 168(3): 823–834.
- "Internalism about Reasons: Sad but True?" Philosophical Studies, January 2014, Volume 167(1): 89–117.
- "Non-Machiavellian Manipulation and the Opacity of Motive," in Manipulation: Theory and Practice, eds. Michael Weber and Christian Coons, Oxford: Oxford University Press, 2014.
- "On Being Social in Metaethics," Oxford Studies in Metaethics, Vol. 8, 2013, ed. Russ Shafer-Landau, Oxford: Oxford University Press.
