= List of sugar manufacturers in Tanzania =

This is a list of sugar manufacturers in Tanzania

- Tanganyika Planting Company Limited
- Kilombero Sugar Company Limited
- Kagera Sugar Limited
- Mtibwa Sugar Estates Limited
- Mkulazi Holding Company Limited
- Bakhresa Sugar Limited

== Output and market share ==
As of December 2017, the output and market share of each manufacturer is summarized in the table below:

Annual Output & Market Share of Sugar Manufacturers in Tanzania
Rank	Name of Manufacturer	2014 Output (Metric tonnes)	Market Share (%)
1	Kilombero Sugar Company Limited	116,495	39.57
2	Tanganyika Planting Company Limited	101,226	34.38
3	Kagera Sugar Limited	50,207	17.05
4	Mtibwa Sugar Estates Limited	26,491	9.00
	Total	294,419	100.00%

- Totals may be a little off due to rounding.

In May 2017, The East African reported that annual production was at about 320,000 metric tonnes against domestic consumption of about 420,000 metric tonnes. By February 2019, national production was estimated at 300,000 metric tonnes annually, with national annual consumption of about 670,000 metric tonnes, of which 515,000 metric tonnes were for domestic consumption and the other 155,000 metric tonnes were for industrial use.

As of June 2020, national annual sugar consumption was estimated at 470,000 tonnes, while national sugar production was 378,000 tonnes in 2019. This created a national sugar deficit of 92,000 tonnes annually.

In June 2021, The Citizen newspaper reported that national sugar output was about 462,900 metric tonnes, with domestic demand of 635,000 metric tonnes annually, creating a deficit of approximately 172,100 metric tonnes every year. Of the 635,000 metric tonnes of annual demand, 470,000 metric tonnes were for domestic sugar and 165,000 metric tonnes were for industrial sugar.

As of December 2023, national sugar demand was estimated at 721,000 metric tonnes annually. Of that, according to the Tanzania Sugar Board, 481,000 tonnes was brown table sugar while 240,000 tonnes was industrial sugar, all of it imported from outside Tanzania. At that time, national sugar production was estimated at to 380,000 tonnes annually. This left an annual deficit of 240,000 metric tonnes of industrial sugar and 101,000 metric tonnes of brown table sugar (total of 341,000 metric tonnes), which was imported from Uganda, India, Brazil and Thailand.

== See also ==
- Economy of Tanzania
