= Undue Subdivision of Land Prevention Act 1885 =

Parliament of Queensland
- Status: Repealed

The Undue Subdivision of Land Prevention Act 1885 was an act of the Parliament of Queensland that was passed to prevent overcrowding and urban degradation in cities and towns in Queensland, and especially in Brisbane. The act is a noteworthy example of early efforts by Australian legislators to control urban development and avoid the appearance of slums.

== The act ==
The act prevented the subdivision of land by speculators and developers into lots less than 16 perches (405 square metres (4,360 sq ft)). As a result, most residential development in the older parts of cities such as Brisbane and Rockhampton consists of detached homes on rectangular lots, usually with a frontage of half a chain or 10.05 metres (33.0 ft), and a depth of two chains or 40.2 metres (132 ft). Frontages of 10 metres necessarily prevent the development of terrace houses, which was the predominant form of mass housing in other Australian cities such as Sydney, Melbourne and Newcastle. Many middle-class and wealthier land owners preferred to buy two adjoining 16-perch allotments and build a larger house straddling the two lots. One Member of the Legislative Council reportedly argued for a minimum lot size of 32 perches — that is, 809 square metres (8,710 sq ft) — during debate.

While the act made Brisbane and other Queensland cities a more attractive and less overcrowded place to live and raise families and allowed each household to grow a garden, it did have its disadvantages, the main one being that the resulting low population density made it more expensive to provide urban services such as sewerage, paving and street lighting. As a result, Brisbane was the last major city in Australia to be comprehensively sewered, and unpaved laneways were common in the inner city until the 1960s. Nor was Brisbane spared the horror of slum development – suburbs such as West End and Red Hill were long known for their general poverty and low socio-economic status, even if they weren't as overcrowded as similarly impoverished districts in Sydney and Melbourne.

The act was rescinded in 1923 and has been replaced several times by more up-to-date town planning legislation such as the current Planning Act 2016. However, Brisbane and other Queensland cities are still noted for their low population densities compared to those in the southern Australian states.

== See also ==
- The Brisbane Institute
