= Rahmat Shoureshi =

American university administrator

9th President of Portland State University
- In office August 2017 – May 2019
- Preceded by: Wim Wiewel
- Succeeded by: Stephen Percy

President of the New York Institute of Technology (Interim)
- In office January 2017 – August 2017
- Preceded by: Edward Guiliano
- Succeeded by: Hank Foley

Personal details
- Education: Sharif University of Technology (B.S.); Massachusetts Institute of Technology (Ph.D, M.S)
- Occupation: University administrator

Rahmat Allah Shoureshi (Persian: رحمت‌الله شورشی) is an Iranian American former university administrator, most prominently at Portland State University (PSU) from 2017 to 2019. In January 2017, Shoureshi began serving as interim president of New York Institute of Technology, where he had previously served as provost and professor. On May 15, 2017 in an email to students, he was officially named as president of Portland State University and took office in August of that year. In March 2019, The Oregonian reported that ethical issues and staff mistreatment caused his future as PSU's president to be uncertain. He was pressured to resign two months later, days before a university board legislative session was scheduled to assemble to discuss his continued employment.

== Career ==
For eight years, Shoureshi served as dean of the School of Engineering and Computing Science at the University of Denver. He also taught mechanical engineering and conducted research at Wayne State University, Purdue University and the Colorado School of Mines. He received his B.S. degree from Sharif University of Technology, and his Ph.D. and M.S. degrees in mechanical engineering from Massachusetts Institute of Technology (MIT) and completed a program in Marketing and Industrial Dynamics at the MIT Sloan School of Management.
