= St George and Sutherland Shire Leader =

Australian newspaper

The Leader
- Type: Weekly newspaper
- Owner: Australian Community Media
- Founded: 29 June 1960 (66 years ago)
- Language: English
- City: Kogarah, New South Wales
- Country: Australia
- Circulation: 82,000 (as of 1961)
- Website: www.theleader.com.au

The St George and Sutherland Shire Leader, commonly known as just The Leader, is a regional newspaper serving part of the southern Sydney region.

As of January 2024 is owned by Australian Community Media and serves around 500,000 people and caters for the St George and Sutherland areas of southern Sydney.

== History ==
The paper was first published on Wednesday, 29 June 1960, as a weekly publication. It was formed as a merger of smaller local newspapers: The Times, The Express, The District and Shire News and The Kingsgrove Riverwood Courier. By 1961, the newspaper had a circulation of 81,000 free weekly copies and sold another 1,000. It ranged in size from 48 to 56 pages. It employed two sub-editors, four reporters, one photographer, a columnist and used outside contributors. In 1984, The Leader moved to a twice-weekly publication on Tuesdays and Thursdays.

Goan Kenyan-born journalist Cyprian Fernandes was editor for around 10 years in the late 1980s to 1990s. At the time, regional newspapers were flourishing, and there were 20 journalists writing for the paper. The Leader won Newspaper of the Year during this time, after he had introduced colour to the layouts.

On 30 July 2020, state Member for Miranda Eleni Petinos moved a notice of motion in the New South Wales Legislative Assembly congratulating the publication "on a fantastic 60 years". The names of the editorial team were mentioned: Craig Thomson, Murray Trembath, John Veage, Merryn Porter, and Chris Lane.

== Ownership ==
The entity was formerly owned by Fairfax Media, prior to its merger with Nine Entertainment in 2018. In April 2019, Nine sold the business to Australian Community Media, owned by Antony Catalano and Alex Waislitz.

== Publication and readership ==
On 16 December 2015, the paper reverted to a weekly publication on Wednesdays.

As of 2020, its circulation was nearly 150,600, which was "the largest of any suburban newspaper in Australia".

It is also available online.
