= Mkulazi Holding Company =

Sugar manufacturing company

Coordinates: 07°10′02″S 38°11′58″E

- Type: Private
- Industry: Manufacture & Marketing of Sugar
- Founded: 2017; 9 years ago
- Headquarters: Morogoro, Tanzania
- Key people: Heldelitha Mista; Chairperson; Selestine Some; CEO
- Products: Brown sugar, Industrial sugar, Industrial ethanol and Electricity
- Number of employees: 5,000+ (2023)

Mkulazi Holding Company Limited (MHCL), is a sugar manufacturer in Tanzania, the second-largest economy in the East African Community.

== Location ==
Mkulazi Holdings Limited plans to construct two sugar factories in the Morogoro Town of Tanzania. The first factory, is planned at Mkulazi, about 85 kilometres (53 mi), by road, south-east of the regional headquarters in Morogoro City. The government of Tanzania has ring-fenced 63,000 acres (98 mi^{2}), on which the factory is being erected. The second factory is planned at Mbigiri, also in Morogoro Region, close to Mbigiri Prison. The two factories are close to sugar plantations owned by the parent company, Mkulazi Holdings Limited.

== Overview ==
The company is a new sugar manufacturer, established in 2017, with planned production capacity of 200,000 metric tonnes annually. The sugar factory also plans to generate 55 megawatts (74,000 hp) of thermal electricity, of which 40 megawatts will be used internally and 15 megawatts will be sold to the national grid. When completed as planned, the company is expected to become the largest sugar manufacturer in Tanzania, with a work-force in excess of 100,000 people. When this company begins maximum production as expected, Tanzania's sugar deficit of about 100,000 metric tonnes as of 2018, will be wiped out, creating another 100,000 tonnes of exportable surplus.

== Ownership ==
Mkulazi Holding Company Limited, is a joint venture company that is wholly owned by the National Social Security Fund of Tanzania (NSSFT) (96 percent), and the Tanzania Prison Services (Prison Corporation Sole) (PCS) (4 percent).

== Developments ==
During the 4th quarter of 2023, the factories of Mkulazi Holding Company Limited reached the commercial production stage, with initial production capacity of 50,000 metric tonnes annually. Other products produced here include industrial sugar (this being the first and only factory in Tanzania producing this product), industrial ethanol and thermal electricity from incenerating bagasse.

== See also ==
- List of sugar manufacturers in Tanzania
- Economy of Tanzania
