= David Livingstone Smith =

Academic

David Livingstone Smith (born 26 September 1953) is professor of philosophy at the University of New England. He gained his MA at Antioch University and a Ph.D. in philosophy at the University of London (Kings College) where he worked on the philosophy of psychology. His research interests include self-deception, dehumanization, human nature, ideology, race and moral psychology. He won the 2012 Anisfield-Wolf Book Award for non-fiction and was a speaker at the 2012 G20 Economic Summit at Los Cabos, Mexico.

On May 16, 2024, Smith and Kate Manne of Cornell University were co-awarded the 2024 Lebowitz Prize for an as-of-yet unpublished presentation titled "Dehumanization and its Discontents."

== Publications ==
- Freud's Philosophy of the Unconscious (Kluwer, 1999).
- Approaching Psychoanalysis: An Introductory Course (Karnac, 1999).
- Hidden Conversations: An Introduction to Communicative Psychoanalysis (Rebus Press, 2nd ed., 1999).
- Psychoanalysis in Focus (Sage, 2002).
- Why We Lie: The Evolutionary Roots of Deception and the Unconscious Mind (St. Martin's Press, 2004).
- The Most Dangerous Animal: Human Nature and the Origins of War (St. Martin's Press, 2007).
- Less Than Human: Why We Demean, Enslave, and Exterminate Others (St. Martins Press, 2011).
- "Beyond Good and Evil: Variations on Some Freudian Themes," in Bohart, A. et al. (eds.), Humanity’s Dark Side (APA Books, 2012).
- "War, evolution, and the nature of human nature," in Shackleford, T. (ed.), Oxford Companion to Evolutionary Approaches to War and Violence (Oxford University Press, 2012).
- "Indexically yours: why being human is more like being here than like being water," in Corby, R. H. A & Lanjouw, A. (eds.), The Politics of Species: Exploring the Species Interface (Cambridge University Press, 2013).
- On Inhumanity: Dehumanization and How to Resist It (Oxford University Press, 2020).

== See also ==
- Dehumanization
- Ideology
- Psychoanalysis
