= Judith Whelan =

Australian journalist and newspaper editor

Judith Whelan (born 1960 or 1961; died 26 June 2024) was an Australian journalist and newspaper editor. She was the second woman to serve as editor of The Sydney Morning Herald (SMH) since its inception in 1831.

== Career ==
Whelan joined the SMH in 1985. After completing her cadetship, she became a health reporter and later was sent to New Zealand and Europe as a foreign correspondent. In 2004 she took over as editor of the Good Weekend magazine. She moved back to daily journalism as editor of the SMH's Saturday paper in 2011. She was promoted to editor of the whole masthead in 2013, becoming only the second woman to fill that position. While editor, she ensured that Lisa Davies would succeed her by appointing Davis to strategic positions. In 2016 she moved to the Australian Broadcasting Corporation (ABC), rising to editorial director in 2022.

At both the SMH and ABC, Whelan was revered by her colleagues for her professionalism and compassion, and mentored many young journalists.

== Personal ==
Whelan died of cancer on 26 June 2024 at Royal Prince Alfred Hospital in Sydney.
