= Bakhresa Sugar Limited =

Sugar manufacturer in Tanzania

Coordinates: 06°29′20″S 38°56′29″E

- Type: Private
- Industry: Manufacture & Marketing of Sugar
- Founded: 30 October 2016; 9 years ago
- Headquarters: Bagamoyo, Tanzania
- Key people: Hussein Sufian; Director
- Products: Sugar

Bakhresa Sugar Limited, whose official name is Bagamoyo Sugar Limited (BSL), is a sugar manufacturer in Tanzania.

== Location ==
The plantation and planned factory of BSL are located in Bagamoyo District, in the Pwani Region of Tanzania, along the Indian Ocean coast. The project sits on 10,000 hectares (39 mi^{2}) of land, that was donated to the Bakhresa Group, who are the developer/owners of the project. This is approximately 75 kilometres (47 mi), by road, north of Dar es Salaam, the financial capital of Tanzania, and its largest city.

== Overview ==
Bakhresa Sugar Limited is a privately owned sugar manufacturer. It is owned by the Bakhresa Group, an industrial conglomerate, with interests in plastics, agribusiness, baked goods, soft beverages, mineral water, hospitality, transportation and warehousing. The project is being developed in phases, with completion expected in five to ten years.

Phase I

This phase started in December 2017 with the commencement of planting sugarcane seedlings. This will be followed by the construction of the crushing machinery. It is expected that this phase will cost TSh:167.3 billion (US$72 million) and conclude in 2020.

Phase II

The second phase will involve the expansion of the sugar plantations to at least 2,000 hectares (4,900 acres).

Phase III

The timing of the third phase will depend on the outcomes of Phase I and Phase II.

In addition to building the sugar factory, grid electricity will need to be extended to the site, a road network has to be built and an irrigation system installed. Total development cost is estimated at TSh:669 billion (US$289 million). Initial annual production is expected to be 30,000 metric tonnes, but production is scalable to 100,000 metric tonnes.

== See also ==
- Economy of Tanzania
- List of sugar manufacturers in Tanzania
