= Down Girl: The Logic of Misogyny =

2017 book by Kate Manne

- Author: Kate Manne
- Subject: Analytic feminism
- Published: 2017 (Oxford University Press)
- ISBN: 9780190604981

Down Girl: The Logic of Misogyny is a book by Kate Manne, treating misogyny in the tradition of analytic feminist philosophy. The book won the Association of American Publishers 2019 PROSE Award in Philosophy (as one category in the Humanities), as well as the overall 2019 PROSE Award for Excellence in Humanities.

== Summary ==
Manne proposes that patriarchy, sexism, and misogyny are distinct: sexism is an ideology justifying patriarchy, while misogyny enforces patriarchy by punishing women who deviate from patriarchy. Manne believes dehumanization of women is not necessary for misogynist violence.

=== Himpathy ===
In Down Girl, Manne introduces the term himpathy, "the excessive sympathy shown toward male perpetrators of sexual violence," and develops the concept in the context of her analysis of the People v. Turner sexual assault trial. The term received media exposure in Manne's New York Times op-ed, "Brett Kavanaugh and America's 'Himpathy' Reckoning", and in titles and headlines in Vox, Jezebel, CNN, The Chronicle of Higher Education, and The Christian Post. In the book's preface, Manne credits her husband with coining the term.

In May 2026, Charlotte Proudman used the word Himpathy in discussion of the 2026 United Kingdom rape sentencing controversy concerning the light sentencing of two teenaged rapists.

== Reception ==
British philosopher Nigel Warburton chose the book as the best philosophy book in 2018.

The American Philosophical Association awarded its biennial Book Prize to Down Girl in 2019. In the prize announcement, the Association wrote: "Manne has succeeded in measurably improving the quality of public discourse on very timely and vexed issues by writing a book that is both accessible and rigorous."

Author Sophie Gilbert of The Atlantic prefaced an article discussing sexism under the presidency of Donald Trump by referencing the book's distinction between sexism and misogyny.
