= Stephen Percy =

American university administrator

10th President of Portland State University
- In office May 2020 – July 31, 2023
- Preceded by: Rahmat Shoureshi
- Succeeded by: Ann Cudd

Personal details
- Occupation: University administrator

Stephen L. Percy is an American university administrator and academic. He was the 10th president of Portland State University, Oregon's third largest university, until July 31, 2023.

== Career ==
Percy graduated from Hamilton College (A.B. Government) and Indiana University (Ph.D. Political Science) before beginning his academic career as an Assistant Professor of Government and Foreign Affairs at the University of Virginia (1981-1988). He would later become a professor at University of Wisconsin-Milwaukee (1988-2011) and the University of Baltimore (2011-2014), where he was also the Dean of the College of Public Affairs. Percy joined the faculty at Portland State in 2014. He had been Dean of the College of Urban and Public Affairs at PSU (2014-2019) when he took over as interim president when the previous president, Rahmat Shoureshi, was pressured by PSU's Board of Trustees to resign. In May 2020, the board of trustees voted unanimously to make Percy's position permanent, making him the 10th president of PSU. Since 1978 Percy has published 6 books, 1 textbook, 29 articles, and 5 book chapters.

Percy retired in August 2023.

Preceded by Rahmat Shoureshi	President of Portland State University; 2020 to present	Succeeded by Incumbent
