= William McGarvie =

Australian newspaper owner

- Born: 1810; Glasgow, Scotland
- Died: 1 April 1841; Sydney, New South Wales, Australia
- Occupations: Journalist, bookseller, pastoralist
- Years active: 1828–1841
- Known for: Co-founding the Sydney Herald
- Spouse: Isabella
- Children: 1

William McGarvie (1810 – 1 April 1841) was a Scottish-born journalist, bookseller, and pastoralist who co-founded the Sydney Herald, the forerunner of The Sydney Morning Herald.

== Early life and career ==
McGarvie was born in Glasgow and received a classical education before entering the service of the Glasgow Herald. In 1828, he emigrated to Australia, arriving in Sydney aboard the Comet. Soon thereafter, he assumed management of the Australian Stationery Warehouse, a business conducted by Robert Howe in association with the Sydney Gazette. It included a circulating library, and in 1829 McGarvie compiled its catalogue, a document regarded today as a valuable record of the social and intellectual life of the period.

== Career ==
In 1831, McGarvie joined Frederick Stokes and Alfred Ward Stephens in the establishment of a new newspaper. They imported a printing press and commenced publication of the Sydney Herald, a newspaper named after the Glasgow Herald.

The first issue appeared on 18 April 1831, with McGarvie articulating its editorial principles. The newspaper advocated political moderation, guided by “wholesome restraint” and “reasoning founded on truth.” It declared loyalty to Britain while pledging to promote literature and education. McGarvie’s inaugural editorial contained an acknowledgment of the talents of native-born Australians and an appeal for governmental measures to foster their advancement. His association with the paper was short-lived; after the sixth issue, he sold his interest to his partners.

== Personal life ==
Following a brief return to Scotland, McGarvie sailed back to Sydney in 1832 aboard the Minerva. During the voyage the vessel encountered a violent storm in which McGarvie sustained lung damage, worsening an already delicate constitution.

Upon his return, McGarvie resumed bookselling and in 1833 issued a further library catalogue. He later secured a land grant of 320 acres at Port Macquarie and augmented this holding with a purchase of 100 acres. He named the estate Mount Pleasant and devoted himself principally to its management from 1835 onward.

In early 1841, after spending six nights in wet bushland, McGarvie contracted a severe cold. His condition deteriorated rapidly and he died in Sydney on 1 April 1841 at the age of thirty-one. He was survived by his wife, Isabella, and their infant son, born three weeks before his death. His estate was valued at £3,000. Isabella later remarried Frederick Mackellar, the grandfather of the Australian poet Dorothea Mackellar.
