= Ann Cudd =

American philosopher

11th President of Portland State University
- Incumbent
- Assumed office August 1, 2023
- Preceded by: Stephen Percy

Personal details
- Born: 1959 (age 66–67)
- Education: Swarthmore College (BA); University of Pittsburgh (MA, MA, PhD)

Academic background
- Thesis: Common knowledge and the theory of interaction (1988)
- Doctoral advisor: David Gauthier

Academic work
- Discipline: Philosophy
- Institutions: University of Kansas; Boston University; University of Pittsburgh; Portland State University

Ann E. Cudd (born 1959) is an American philosopher. She is the president of Portland State University as of August 1, 2023. She was previously the provost and senior vice chancellor and professor of philosophy at the University of Pittsburgh and dean of the college and graduate school of arts and sciences at Boston University.

She also served as vice provost and dean of undergraduate studies, as well as university distinguished professor of philosophy at the University of Kansas and was an affiliated faculty member in the Women, Gender, and Sexualities Studies Program during her time there. She was a founding member of the Society for Analytical Feminism, and served as its president from 1995 to 1999. On March 10, 2023, Cudd was formally selected as the 11th president of Portland State University.

== Education and career ==
Cudd received a dual baccalaureate in mathematics and philosophy from Swarthmore College in 1982, before going on to the University of Pittsburgh to receive a master's degree in philosophy, a master's in economics, and a doctorate in philosophy, in 1984, 1986, and 1988, respectively. After receiving her doctorate, Cudd accepted a position as assistant professor at the University of Kansas. She left in 1991 for a similar position at Occidental College, but returned to the University of Kansas in 1993. She was promoted to associate professor of philosophy at the University of Kansas in 1994, full professor of philosophy in 2000, and received a secondary appointment as director and full professor of gender and women's studies in 2001 (which she held until 2008, when she became an affiliated faculty member.)

In 2008, Cudd became the associate dean for humanities for the University of Kansas, and in 2012, Cudd was named distinguished professor, the highest academic honor the University of Kansas bestows on faculty members. In 2013, Cudd was named vice provost and dean of undergraduate studies.

== Research areas and publications ==
Cudd's research has focused in several areas, namely feminist theory, the philosophy of social science, and social and political philosophy. Cudd is one of the founders of analytical feminism, a branch of feminism which seeks to apply the methods of analytical philosophy to feminist issues and topics. She has written two books and co-edited three more: Capitalism For and Against: A Feminist Debate (co-authored with Nancy Holmstrom in 2011), Analyzing Oppression in 2006, co-edited Philosophical Perspectives on Democracy in the 21st Century with Sally Scholz in 2014, co-edited Feminist Theory: A Philosophical Anthology in 2006, and co-edited Theorizing Backlash: Philosophical Reflections on the Resistance to Feminism in 2002. She has also written dozens of articles in peer-reviewed journals, written several encyclopedia articles, and many book reviews.

Much of Cudd's work analyzes power relationships through rational choice theory. Cudd's analysis of oppression argues that in an objective moral theory it is necessary to know whether or not harms experienced by individuals were indeed actual harms that the person shouldn't have suffered and are thus, in fact, oppressive. Cudd argues that the simple absence of good choices is not a form of coercion – for coercion to occur, objectively better choices must have been available to the subject.

== Selected bibliography ==
=== Books ===
- Cudd, Ann E.; Superson, Anita M. (2002). Theorizing backlash : philosophical reflections on the resistance to feminism. Lanham, Maryland: Rowman & Littlefield. ISBN 9780742513747.
- Cudd, Ann E.; Andreasen, Robin O. (2005). Feminist theory: a philosophical anthology. Oxford, UK Malden, Massachusetts: Blackwell Publishing. ISBN 9781405116619.
- Cudd, Ann (2006). Analyzing oppression. New York: Oxford University Press. ISBN 9780195187441.
- Cudd, Ann E.; Holmstrom, Nancy (2011). Capitalism, for and against: a feminist debate. Cambridge New York: Cambridge University Press. ISBN 9780521132114.

=== Book chapters ===
- Cudd, Ann E. (1998), "Psychological explanations of oppression", in Willett, Cynthia (ed.), Theorizing multiculturalism: a guide to the current debate, Malden, Massachusetts: John Wiley & Sons, pp. 187–215, ISBN 9780631203421.
- Cudd, Ann E. (2004), "The paradox of liberal feminism: preference, rationality, and oppression", in Baehr, Amy R. (ed.), Varieties of feminist liberalism, Lanham, Maryland Oxford: Rowman & Littlefield Publishers, ISBN 9780742512030.
- Cudd, Ann E.; Jones, Leslie E. (2005), "Sexism", in Cudd, Ann E.; Andreasen, Robin O. (eds.), Feminist theory: a philosophical anthology, Oxford, UK Malden, Massachusetts: Blackwell Publishing, pp. 73–83, ISBN 9781405116619.
- Cudd, Ann E.; Jones, Leslie E. (2005), "Sexism", in Frey, R.G.; Heath Wellman, Christopher (eds.), A companion to applied ethics, Blackwell Companions to Philosophy, Oxford, UK Malden, Massachusetts: Blackwell Publishing, pp. 102–117, doi:10.1002/9780470996621.ch8, ISBN 9781405133456.
- Cudd, Ann E. (2013), "Human rights and global equal opportunity: inclusion not provision", in Holder, Cindy; Reidy, David (eds.), Human rights: the hard questions, New York Cambridge: Cambridge University Press, pp. 193–208, ISBN 9780521176262.
- Cudd, Ann E. (2018). "Part II: Questioning Libertarian Principles; Ch. 2: Feminism and Self-Ownership". In Brennan, Jason; van der Vossen, Bas; Schmidtz, David (eds.). The Routledge Handbook of Libertarianism. London and New York: Taylor & Francis Group. pp. 127–139. ISBN 9780367870591.

=== Journal articles ===
- Cudd, Ann E. (April 1993). "Game theory and the history of ideas about rationality: an introductory survey". Economics and Philosophy. 9 (1): 101–133. doi:10.1017/S0266267100005137. S2CID 144911597.
- Cudd, Ann E. (August 1995). "Analytic feminism: a brief introduction" (PDF). Hypatia. 10 (3): 1–6. doi:10.1111/j.1527-2001.1995.tb00734.x. hdl:1808/7603. S2CID 145800633.
- Cudd, Ann E. (August 1998). "Multiculturalism as a cognitive virtue of scientific practice" (PDF). Hypatia. 10 (3): 43–61. doi:10.1111/j.1527-2001.1998.tb01369.x. hdl:1808/7776. S2CID 144806453.
