= Cyprian Fernandes =

Journalist and author

Cyprian "Skip" Fernandes (born September 1943) is a retired journalist and author. Having started life and his career in Kenya, he is now based in Sydney, Australia.

== Early life and education ==
Cyprian Fernandes was born in September 1943 into a Goan family in Nairobi, Kenya, which was still a British colony. He was raised, along with five siblings, by a single mother, after his alcoholic father had left the family. He left school at 13 years old after the headmaster falsely accused him of stealing altar wine, but continued to read widely. He grew up in the Asian suburb of Eastleigh in Nairobi.

== Career ==
Fernandes worked first in a warehouse, followed by a bank, the civil service, and then as an acting juvenile probation officer. After lying about his age, claiming to be 22, Fernandes was hired as a sports journalist at the Daily Nation and Sunday Nation when he was 17, in 1960. He was one of the first Kenyan-born reporters at the papers, which were part of Aga Khan IV's newspaper empire. Fernandes' career was influenced there by the Goan editor of the Daily Nation, Joe Rodrigues.

He moved on from reporting sports to general news – court, local government, local and national politics, parliamentary reporting, and other affairs in and affecting East Africa (Kenya, Uganda, and Tanzania) – "before spending considerable time investigating various aspects of life wherever the story was to be found".

As a journalist at the Nation, Fernandes lived through the Mau Mau rebellion – people fighting for the return of their lands – and then lead-up to Kenyan independence in 1963, and after this, violent times which included one tribe's dominance over the country and, after discriminatory laws were passed, the departure of many Asians from Kenya.

He became a political and investigative journalist in the early 1960s, and got to know many future leaders well. Fernandes obtained one of the earliest interviews with Idi Amin, who was responsible for the expulsion of Asians from Uganda, travelled with President Jomo Kenyatta and his ministers, including vice president Joseph Murumbi Zurate (who was half-Goan), and Munich Games massacre in 1972. By this time, he was chief reporter.

However, Fernandez had to abandon his career in journalism in Kenya after receiving threats to his family, after he had questioned various land ownership deals involving President Jomo Kenyatta and his wife Mama Ngina. In 1973 or 1974 the Fernandes family settled in the UK, and Cyprian he worked on the British tabloids for some years.

After being appointed as a senior sub-editor by Fairfax Media, he migrated to Australia in 1979. He was the founding chief sub-editor of The Sydney Morning Herald's magazine Good Weekend (launched May 1978), in the 1980s. and was held senior positions on this newspaper and later The Australian.

He was editor of the St George and Sutherland Shire Leader for 10 years, and was known as "Skip". At the time, regional newspapers were flourishing, and he had 20 journalists available. The Leader won Newspaper of the Year during this time, after he had introduced colour to the layouts. After leaving the paper, he took up a job in communications role with Caltex oil refinery in Kurnell, and during this time also edited the newspaper The Indian Down Under for 10 years.

== After retirement ==
He retired from his journalistic career around 2000, but has since written a couple of books and has also written articles for The Goan as recently as July 2023.

=== Books ===
In 2016, Fernandes published a memoir, Yesterday in Paradise, 1950-1974, via Balboa Press.

In 2018, Fernandes published Stars Next Door. Published in Goa, the book tells the story of the many Goan sportsmen and -women who excelled in East Africa, as well as East African musicians of Goan origin.

In 2021, Twilight of the Exiles was published by the Fellowship of Australian Writers. It contains the stories of 41 people originally from Goa who migrated from Africa.

== Personal life ==
Fernandes married Rufina and they had children in Kenya before leaving for the UK.
