= Adrian Deamer =

Australian journalist, newspaper editor and lawyer

Adrian Milford Deamer (25 July 1922 – 16 January 2000) was an Australian journalist, newspaper editor and lawyer.

== Early life ==
Deamer began his journalistic career in 1946 at The Daily Telegraph in Sydney, Australia. Son of noted newspaper editor Sydney Harold Deamer, Adrian became highly regarded throughout his career for his integrity, humour, courage and mentorship.

== Career ==
=== As a journalism ===
After a stint at The Courier Mail in Brisbane, Deamer worked in Melbourne as a general reporter at The Age, before heading for England in 1950. He married Gweneth Margaret Tanner on 19 October 1950 at St Marylebone in London and worked at The Daily Express and for Associated Press before returning to Melbourne in 1953 as Chief of Staff on The Melbourne Herald.

In 1960, Deamer returned to London to serve as editor of The Herald and Weekly Times Group, returning to Melbourne in 1962 where he was Associate Editor on The Sun News Pictorial.

In 1966, he moved to Canberra and joined Rupert Murdoch's fledgling paper The Australian and became its third editor.

In 1971, Murdoch sacked Deamer for writing an editorial which criticised the Springbok Tour of Australia at a time when public opinion was quite heated about South Africa's regime of apartheid. Murdoch was later to describe Deamer in glowing terms but the die was cast.

=== As a lawyer ===
Deamer retrained as a lawyer and joined The Sydney Morning Herald as their legal advisor. In 1991, with colleagues George Richards and Peter Wilson, he wrote the Fairfax Legal Guide. He became an advocate of defamation and media law and presented an A.N. Smith Memorial Lecture in 1971 on running a national newspaper. He was a Walkley Advisory Board Member and an Australian Press Council judge.

== Death ==
Deamer died of cancer on 16 January 2000, aged 77. In 2017, he was inducted, posthumously, into the Melbourne Press Club's Hall of Fame.
