= Anne Manne =

Australian journalist and social philosopher

Anne Manne (née Robinson; born 1955) is an Australian journalist and social philosopher.

== Life and work ==
Anne Manne has been married to Australian political science professor Robert Manne since 1983. They have two children, including Cornell University philosophy professor Kate Manne.

Her book, Crimes of the Cross, was a finalist for the Walkley Book Award and longlisted for the Australian Political Book of the Year Award in 2024.

== Bibliography ==
=== Books ===
- Manne, Anne (2005). Motherhood : how should we care for our children?. Crows Nest, NSW: Allen & Unwin.
- — (2009). So this is life : scenes from a country childhood. Carlton, Vic.: Melbourne University Press.
- — (2014). The life of I : the new culture of narcissism. Carlton, Vic.: Melbourne University Press.
- — (2024). Crimes of the Cross : the Anglican paedophile network of Newcastle, its protectors and the man who fought for justice. Black Inc.

=== Essays and reporting ===
- Manne, Anne (June 1995). "Children in the new world order". Quadrant. 39 (6).
- — (October 1995). "Unpacking my grandmother's linen cupboard". Tales of a Country Girlhood. Quadrant. 39 (10): 46–48.
- — (December 1995). "Mr Menzies' pension". Tales of a Country Girlhood. Quadrant. 39 (12): 16–18.
- — (January–February 1996). "Electing a new child". Quadrant. 40 (1–2): 8–19.
- — (May 1996). "Reading Fairy Blackstick". Society. Quadrant. 40 (5): 16–18.
- — (March 2008). "Love and money : the family and the free market". Quarterly Essay. 29.
- "Ebony: The Girl in the Room". 28 January 2010., The Monthly, Issue 53, February 2010, pp. 36–42.
- "Only Connect: Loneliness in the Age of Freedom". 2 May 2007., The Monthly, Issue 23, May 2007, pp. 32–39
- "Love me Tender? Sex & power in the age of pornography". 6 December 2006., The Monthly, Issue 19, December 2006 - January 2007, pp. 34–42
- "What About Me? The New Narcissism". 7 June 2006., The Monthly, Issue 13, June 2006, pp. 30–35

=== Critical studies and reviews of Manne's work ===
- Jaivin, Linda (August 2014). "The rising tide of narcissism". Arts & Letters. Books. The Monthly. 103: 50–51. Review of The life of I.
- Elliott, Anthony (September 2014). "A culture named desire". Australian Book Review. 364: 17, 19. Review of The life of I.
