= Kagera Sugar Limited =

Sugar manufacturer in Tanzania

Coordinates: 01°00′07″S 31°46′41″E

- Type: Private: Subsidiary of Kagera Sugar Group
- Industry: Manufacture & Marketing of Sugar
- Founded: July 1973; 53 years ago
- Headquarters: 14 Nyerere Road, Bukoba, Kagera Region, Tanzania
- Key people: Managing Director; Seif Seif
- Products: Sugar
- Website: Homepage

Kagera Sugar Limited (KSL), is a sugar manufacturer in Tanzania. As of 2019 Kagera Sugar was the third largest producer of sugar in the country, accounting for 17 percent market share.

== Location ==
The main offices and factories of the company are located at 14 Nyerere Road, in the city of Bukoba, in the Kagera Region, in northwest Tanzania.

== Overview ==
KSL is the third-largest manufacturer of sugar in Tanzania, producing an estimated 95,000 metric tonnes annually, as of 2022. At that time production was expected to increase to 170,000 metric tonnes annually, by 2025.

The company, in its present configuration was incorporated in 2002 and is owned by two Tanzanian corporate entities. KSL maintains a plantation that occupies 17,000 hectares (66 mi^{2}) of which 10,000 hectares (39 mi^{2}) were under sugarcane cultivation in 2014. At that time, 7,000 hectares (27 mi^{2}) were under irrigation from the Kagera River that borders the sugar plantation.

== History ==
The first "Kagera Sugar Limited" was incorporated on 17 July 1973. It was wholly owned by Sugar Development Corporation, a Tanzanian government entity. During the Uganda–Tanzania War (October 1978–June 1979), the Uganda Army invaded the Kagera region and destroyed crops and infrastructure belonging to KSL.

A new factory was constructed by Walchndnager Industries Limited of India. The new factory began production in 1983, with maximum annual capacity of 56,000 tons of sugar. However output progressively declined from "8,823 tons in 1983/84 to 943 tons of sugar in 1987/88". In 1990 the Tanzanian government decided to rehabilitate the company with the participation of the private sector.

The rehabilitation was carried out starting in August 1990. New Sugar Company Limited (NEWSCO), Kagera Sugar Limited and Sugar Development Corporation, all of Tanzania together with African Management Services Company, BV of Netherlands and Booker Tate Limited of the United Kingdom, participated in the rehabilitation of KSL in the 1990s. In 2002, KSL was acquired by two Tanzanian businesses, when the national government divested from the business.

== Ownership ==
KSL is owned by two businesses domiciled in Tanzania, as illustrated in the table below:

Shareholding In Kagera Sugar Limited Stock
Rank	Name of Owner	Percentage Ownership
1	Super Star Forwarders Company Limited	
2	Superdoll Trailer (Tanzania) Manufacturing Company Limited	
	Total	100.00

- Note: The two companies share common ownership by two brothers; Nassor Seif (67.0 percent) and Seif Seif (33.0 percent).

== Subsidiaries ==
In July 2023, Kagera Sugar Limited was selected by the business rescue practitioners (BRPs) of Tongaat Hulett Limited (THL), a South African-based conglomerate that was in financial administration, to take over ownership of the sugar division of THL in South Africa, together with investments in Botswana, Mozambique and Zimbabwe. KSL outcompeted more than 70 other companies worldwide to get the Southern African businesses. KSL already owns subsidiaries in the Democratic Republic of the Congo, Bahrain and Oman.

== See also ==
- List of sugar manufacturers in Tanzania
- Kagera Sugar FC
