= Nation Media Group =

Public media group in Kenya

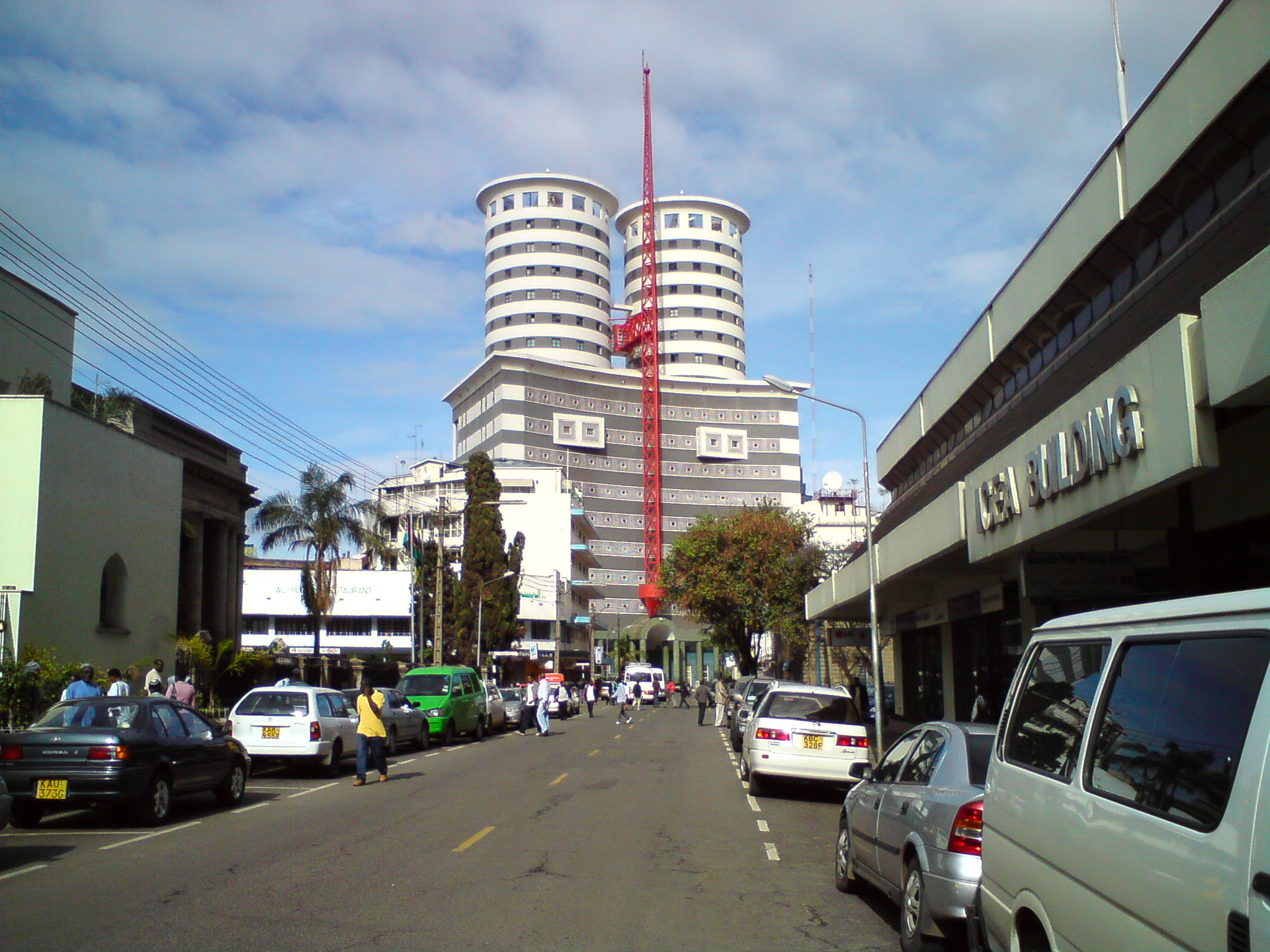
- Nation Centre, headquarters of the Nation Media Group
- Type: Public
- Traded as: KN: NMG
- Industry: Media
- Founded: 1959
- Headquarters: Nation Centre, Kimathi Street, Central Nairobi
- Products: Newspapers, magazines, radio stations, television stations
- Number of employees: 1,142 (2024)
- Website: www.nationmedia.com

Nation Media Group (NMG), formerly known as East African Newspapers (Nation Series) Ltd, is an East African media group based in Kenya and listed on the Nairobi Stock Exchange. It is owned by Rostam Azizi.

== History ==
NMG was founded in 1959 by Aga Khan IV as East African Newspapers (Nation Series) Ltd, under the Aga Khan Fund for Economic Development. In 1999, NMG launched NTV, a news channel in Kenya, and Easy FM (now known as Nation FM).

== Media outlets ==
As of 2007 the group was the largest private media house in East and Central Africa, with offices in Kenya, Uganda, and Tanzania.

The group publications include:

- The EastAfrican
- Daily Nation
- Business Daily Africa
- Daily Monitor
- The Citizen
- NMG Investor Briefing
- Taifa Leo
- MyNetwork.

The Daily Nation and its Sunday edition, the Sunday Nation, celebrated their 50th anniversaries in 2010, branded by the Nation Media Group as "50 Golden Years".In 2016, MyNetwork replaced Zuqka, with both having the youth as their target audience.

=== Regional presence ===
As of 2016 NMG owned a 76.5% stake in the Monitor Publications Limited and 93.3 KFM, a Kampala-based radio station in Uganda. It also owns two television stations in the country, NTV Uganda and Spark TV. NMG also has a 60% shareholding in Mwananchi Communications Limited' in Tanzania. The group's East African subsidiaries, especially the Tanzanian business, contribute significantly to growth in the group.

In March 2016, NMG commissioned a new state-of-the art printing press on Mombasa Road in Nairobi. The new facility has capacity to print 86,000 newspapers per hour. It cost KSh2 billion (about US$20 million) and will print the dailies Daily Nation, Business Daily, Taifa Leo and the weekly The EastAfrican.

== Shareholding ==
The shares of stock of the Group are listed at the Nairobi Stock Exchange and are cross-listed at the Uganda Securities Exchange as well as the Rwanda Stock Exchange, trading at all three bourses under the symbol "NMG". As of December 2014, there were a total of 10,436 shareholders in the company. Of these, 4,135, owned 1 to 500 shares each, with a cumulative total of 782,157 shares, controlling 0.41 percent of the company. The seven largest shareholders controlled 62.57 percent of the total shareholding. These included:

- Rostam Azizi with 44.66 percent.
- Alpine Investments Limited with 10.15 percent.
- National Social Security Fund with 3.44 percent.
- John Kibunga Kimani who had 1.54 percent shareholding.
- Jubilee Insurance Company of Kenya Limited with 1.07 percent.
- Standard Chartered Nominees A/c KE17984, who controlled 0.91 percent
- CfC Stanbic Nominee Limited with 0.81 percent shareholding.

== Awards ==
- 2021 IF Design Awards for an outstanding digital platform
- 2021 Global Media Awards (by the International News Media Association (INMA))
- 2022 Global Media Awards

== See also ==
- List of newspapers in Kenya
- List of newspapers in Tanzania
- List of newspapers in Uganda
