= Ben Naparstek =

Australian digital media executive and former journalist

Ben Naparstek (born 1986) is an Australian digital media executive and former journalist.

== Career ==
After graduating with degrees in Arts & Law (Hons) from the University of Melbourne, he was awarded an Owen Fellowship to study at the Johns Hopkins University in Baltimore, where he co-edited The Jacqueline Rose Reader (Duke University Press).

Naparstek was editor of the current affairs magazine The Monthly from May 2009 until February 2012.

From February 2012 until August 2015, he edited Good Weekend, which is inserted weekly in The Sydney Morning Herald and The Age. He then moved to Special Broadcasting Service, where for two years he was head of editorial, online and emerging platforms. In May 2017, Naparstek was recruited by PR firm Edelman Australia as their content and digital director. He also sits on the board of Yourtown, an Australian not-for-profit organisation to help disadvantaged young people.

In 2014 he was awarded a Churchill Fellowship to study new funding models for public service journalism.

== In Conversation ==
A collection of his magazine profiles, written while freelancing for publications such as The Financial Times Magazine as an undergraduate student, was published by Scribe in 2009 as In Conversation and translated into Mandarin and Portuguese.

The Sydney Morning Herald described the book as “exceptional”, noting “he has a finely honed ability to write a profile” and is "a very fine colour feature writer”. The Age wrote that “his profiles are as impressive as his subjects – erudite but never obscure or showy”. The Spectator described Naparstek's profiles as “wide-ranging, the writing fluent and imaginative” while the Australian Book Review noted “Naparstek's prose is crisp, relaxed and unflashily learned".

== Audio Executive Producer ==
As Head of Content for Audible Australia and New Zealand (2018-2021), Naparstek executive-produced 50+ narrative podcasts such as The Maker Upperers with Taika Waititi's Piki Films, When A Good Man Kills with David Farrier, How To Be Gay with Josh Thomas, Rogue Son with Nazeem Hussain, John Safran vs The Occult, and fiction podcasts including The Orchard starring Eric Bana (winning the Banff Rockie Award for best fiction podcast), The Outrageous True Story of Milky Moore with Jim Jefferies, Slushy created by Kate McLennan and Kate McCartney and Winding Road starring Dacre Montgomery and Yael Stone.

It Burns: The Scandal-Plagued Race to Breed the World's Hottest Chili with Marc Fennell was nominated for the Rose d’Or and the AIB Awards. It won at the Oscars of food The James Beard Awards and a silver medal at the 2020 New York Festivals Radio Awards. The follow-up Nut Jobs won awards for best podcast at the Mumbrella Publish and Australian Podcast Awards and internationally was nominated for Rose d'Or and IAB awards.

At Audible Naparstek championed amplifying diverse voices, with two podcasts winning the Walkley Award for Media Diversity: No Gangsters in Paradise and The Greatest Menace, an investigation into the world's only 'gay prison', which also won gold at the New York Radio Festivals. In 2019, Naparstek conceived of and launched the inaugural Audible Inspiring Voices Scholarship for Women and led Audible's efforts as the inaugural sponsor of the Jesse Cox Audio Fellowship promoting creators from under-represented communities.

== Criticism ==
In 2013, Naparstek was publicly criticised by John van Tiggelen who became the editor of The Monthly after Naparstek's departure. Van Tiggelen accused Naparstek of underpaying female writers - claims dismissed by Fairfax Media as "absolute nonsense" - and of attempts to poach writers from The Monthly.

In 2015, Naparstek's editorial conduct was publicly criticised by actress Caitlin Stasey. Emails revealed by Stasey showed Naparstek commissioned nude photos of her to accompany an interview about female empowerment she gave to Good Weekend, the publication Naparstek headed at the time. Stasey refused, and consequently had her story canned. Fairfax Media clarified that the story was spiked for editorial reasons and attributed the dispute about the photo shoot to a miscommunication with the photo desk.
