= Sydney Deamer =

Australian journalist

Sydney Harold Deamer (1 December 1891 – 30 October 1962) was a newspaper journalist, an editor and soldier.

Sydney Deamer, the son of Adrian Milford and Rhoda (née Milford) Deamer, was born on 1 December 1891 at Avondale Square, Old Kent Road, London. In 1912, he emigrated to Australia and, in 1914, enlisted in the Australian Imperial Forces in Western Australia initially serving with the 2nd Australian Stationary Hospital, Australian Army Medical Corps as a private and NCO at Gallipoli, and later, in 1916, in the Quartermaster General's branch in Egypt. He returned to England in August 1916 and was attached to Headquarters, and for a time, with the Warchest Club—a residential and recreational club for troops on leave in London. In October 1917, he was sent to officer cadet training in Reading, and in January 1918, he commenced basic pilot training at Shawbury, graduating in May. On completion of this training, he was commissioned as a pilot officer and second lieutenant. On 30 September 1918, whilst flying over German lines, he was shot in the leg by machine gun fire from the ground and was invalided back to England. In early 1919, he returned to Australia "at his own expense" and resigned his commission.

Deamer had a distinguished career in civilian life as a journalist in England and Australia and as a newspaper editor for the Sydney Daily Telegraph under the new proprietor Sir Frank Packer between 1936 and 1939. In 1939, Deamer joined the Australian Broadcasting Commission in a public relations role. For fourteen years, Deamer wrote the much-loved Column Eight daily feature in the Sydney Morning Herald. Sydney Harold Deamer died in the district of Brentford in Middlesex, England on 30 October 1962.

His wife, Martha ("Dolly") Clara (née Jones), predeceased him by a year. Martha died in Sydney on 30 March 1961. He was survived by two sons: Tom Perry Deamer, a documentary film producer and principal of the alternative education ERA School in Melbourne; and Adrian Milford Deamer, an early editor of The Australian, and subsequently became legal advisor to the Sydney Morning Herald.
