= The Brisbane Institute =

Former independent conservative think tank in Brisbane, Australia

The Brisbane Institute was an independent think tank based in Brisbane, Queensland, Australia.

== History ==
The Brisbane Institute was founded in 1999. Peter Botsman, who had previously been the executive director of the Evatt Foundation, was the inaugural Director. Botsman left Brisbane in 2001 to run the Whitlam Institute at the University of Western Sydney.

Operations were ceased in 2013, despite the organisation still having an active website. Their last social media post was on Twitter 27 September 2013, where it self-describes as "Queensland's forum for ideas, insight and innovation", and signalled the institution was defunct from that point onward.

== Activities and issues ==
The Brisbane Institute was very active in its first two years, holding seminars, breakfast and lunch discussions and weekly lectures. Notable speakers included Noel Pearson, Derek Shearer, Peter Beattie, Anna Bligh, Justice Michael Kirby, Lady Kennedy of The Shaws and the painter Jeffrey Smart.

The Institute specialised in social, political, economic and cultural issues. In 2004-05 it had a particular emphasis on the regional planning issues confronting South East Queensland. In addition to the regular functions, the Brisbane Institute also curated exhibitions, including 'The Two Hundred Kilometre City' and 'Defending the North: Queensland in the Pacific War'.

The Brisbane Institute curated the exhibition The 200 Kilometre City, which opened in September 2004 at the Museum of Brisbane. The title refers to the linear urban development extending from Tweed Heads to Noosa and the possibility of that development being continuous sometime in the future. Currently, 2.335 million people live in this area, 1.8 million of which live in Brisbane. It is estimated that the total population of the "200 Kilometre city" could be 7 million by 2026.

A related issue put forward by the institute is that of the amount of "green space" in SEQ. In an audit by the Institute comparing the green space of greater Sydney and SEQ, it was found that 17.4% of SEQ was green space (including National Park, Conservation Park, State Forest and State Reserve) compared with 42.9% of Greater Sydney. The study area for both cities was 150 kilometres (93 mi) East-West and 250 kilometres (160 mi) North-South.

== Funding ==
The Brisbane Institute was funded by the University of Queensland, the Brisbane City Council, the Queensland State Government and a number of companies. The Institute ran an e-zine on its website called The Brisbane Line - a somewhat cheeky title alluding to the widespread fear and belief in Queensland that in the event of an invasion of Queensland by the Japanese in the Pacific War, that the rest of Australia through the Federal government would abandon all of Queensland to the north of Brisbane (the theoretical 'Brisbane Line'.)

== Recognition ==
The Brisbane Institute received a mention in Mark Latham's The Latham Diaries (2005), on page 109.
