= Mwananchi Communications =

Newspaper company based in Tanzania

- Founded: 1999
- Headquarters: 56MC+98 Dar es Salaam, Tanzania
- Parent: Nation Media Group

Mwananchi Communications Ltd is a company based in Tanzania. Mwananchi Communications Ltd, engages in the print media

and digital media, and is the publisher of Tanzanian daily newspaper, Mwananchi (in Swahili), and others such as The Citizen, Sunday Citizen, Mwananchi Jumapili, Mwananchi Scoop and Mwanaspoti.

The executive editor is Victor Mushi and the Mwananchi daily managing editor is Joseph Nyabukika. Michael Momburi heads Mwanaspoti in Tanzania and Kenya. Mpoki Thomson is the managing editor of The Citizen Daily and Sunday Citizen. Upon his appointment to the managing editor role in January 2021, he became the youngest editor to hold such a position at 28 years old.

Bakari Machumu is the managing director of the company.

Mwananchi Communications Limited was established in May 1999 by Ambassador Ferdinand Ruhinda as Media Communications Ltd. But in April 2001, a new company was formed—Mwananchi Communications Ltd. In the same year Mwananchi Communications Ltd was acquired by the Nation Media Group (NMG), which is based in Nairobi, Kenya.

== Location ==
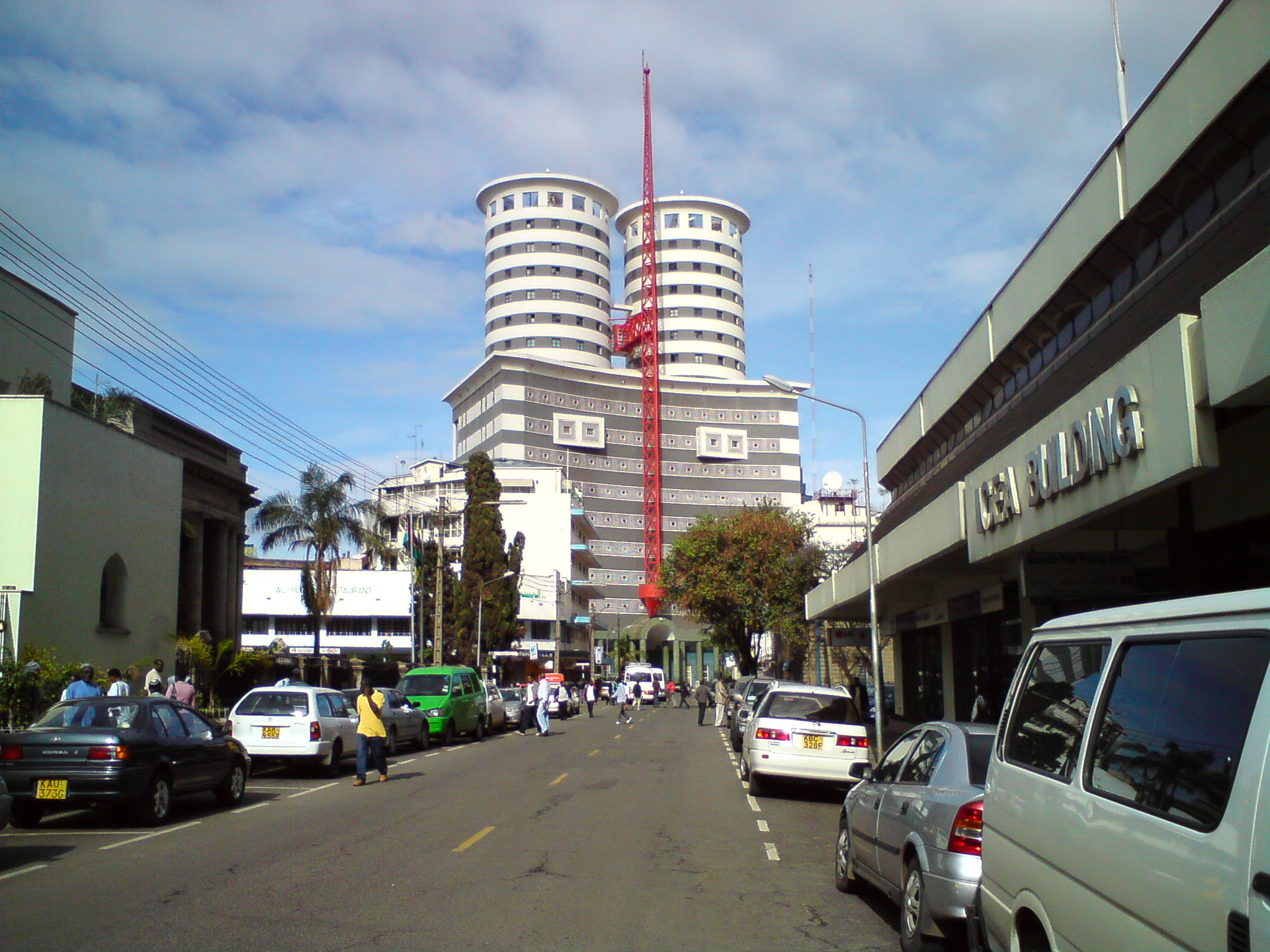
Nation Center, headquarters of the Nation Media Group, the parent company of Mwananchi Communications Ltd.

It is headquartered at Plot No. 34/35 Tabata Relini on Mandela Road, Dar es Salaam, Tanzania. It is part of the Nation Media Group, a publicly listed company, quoted on the Nairobi Stock Exchange.

== History ==
Mwananchi Communications Ltd. was founded in 1999 when Hon. Ferdinand Ruhinda started a communications company known as Media Communications Ltd. Mwananchi registered on 20 April 2000. On 27 May 2000, the first copy of Mwananchi was launched. It was a 12-page newspaper retailing at Sh150.

Shortly after the launch of Mwananchi, a biweekly sports newspaper Mwanaspoti was launched on 12 February 2001. It was a 12-page sports paper retailing at Sh100.

In April 2001, two and a half years after launching the products, the role of publishing was handed over from Media Communications to a newly registered publishing company, Mwananchi Communications Ltd. In December 2002, Nation Media Group of Kenya purchased controlling interests in the company.

Having registered The Citizen with Tanzania Information Services (Maelezo) on 2 March 2001, the paper was only fully launched and published on 16 September 2004, to become the fifth English daily newspaper in the market.

The Company's publications were printed by contract until 2005, when it acquired a secondhand printing press from Australia.

In 2020 it was ordered by the Tanzania Communications Regulatory Authority to suspend the online publication of Mwananchi for six months and pay a fine of 5 million shilling for publishing "misleading information that caused confusion in the community". Two of its employees were arrested and charged accused of breaching the cybercrimes act of 2015.

On 3 October 2024, the Tanzania Communications Authority imposed a 30-day suspension on The Citizen and Mwananchi, citing violations of the Electronics and Postal Communications (Online Content) Regulations, 2020. The suspension followed the publication of a social media clip by The Citizen, which highlighted increasing cases of abductions and disappearances in Tanzania. The media regulator stated that the content "threatens and is likely to affect and harm national unity and social peace.

== Newspapers ==
English language newspapers

- The Citizen – An independent English newspaper in Tanzania
- The Citizen on Sunday – The Sunday edition of The Citizen

Swahili-language newspapers

- Mwananchi – Leading daily newspaper in Tanzania
- Mwanaspoti – A biweekly sports and entertainment newspaper
- Mwanaspoti Kenya - Kenya’s first and leading Kiswahili sports newspaper
- Mwananchi Jumapili – The Sunday edition of Mwananchi newspaper
- Mwananchi Scoop - Swanglish digital magazine for youth that covers stories on entertainment and sports, stories, gossip, career and skills, technology, health, fashion and money management

== Magazines ==
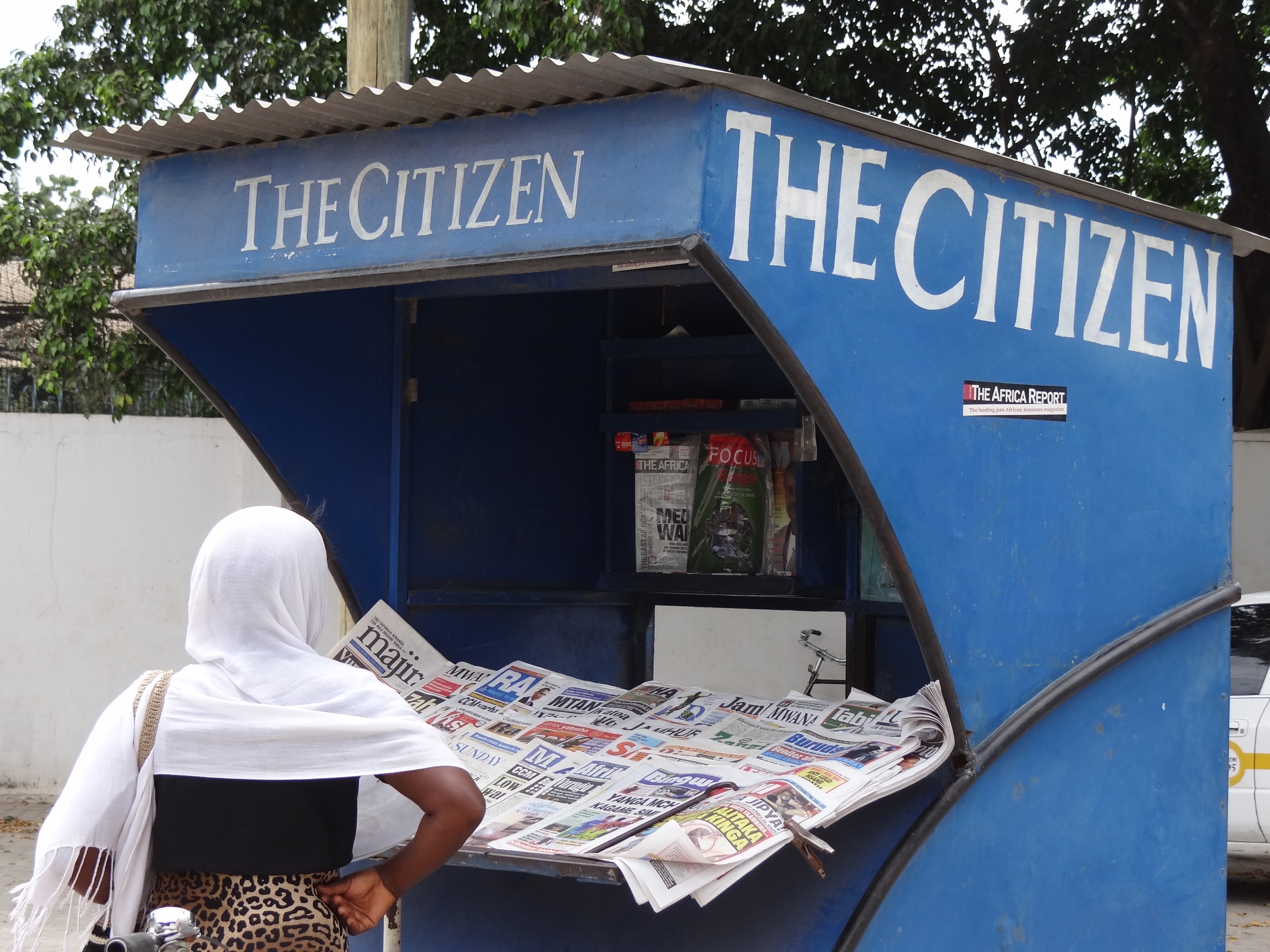
Newsstand

English language magazines

- Your Health – a health magazine published every Monday and carried in The Citizen
- Political Platform – a political review magazine published every Wednesday and carried in The Citizen
- Success – an education review magazine published every Monday and carried in The Citizen
- The Beat – a magazine focusing on entertainment and showbiz issues published every Friday and carried in The Citizen
- Business Week – a business magazine published every Thursday and carried in The Citizen
- Woman – a woman's magazine published every Saturday and carried in The Citizen
- Sound Living - A family magazine that features uplifting stories that happen in society

Swahili-language magazines

- SpotiMikiki – a sports magazine published every Monday and carried in Mwananchi
- Siasa – focuses on analysis of the recent political events and investigative stories; a pullout published every Tuesday and carried in Mwananchi
- Maarifa – a platform for sharing among students and teachers. It is a pullout published every Wednesday and carried in Mwananchi
- Uchumi – a magazine that focuses on business news, events, and economic matters, it is published every Thursday and carried in Mwananchi
- Jungukuu – a society issues magazine published every Friday and carried in Mwananchi
- Starehe – a sports magazine published every Saturday and carried in Mwananchi
- Johari – a special pull-out magazine targeted at the female reader, with articles on fashion, decor, beauty, short stories, parenting advice etc., published every Sunday and carried in Mwananchi Jumapili
