= The Sydney Morning Herald =

Daily compact newspaper in Australia

- Independent. Always.

- The front page on 9 May 2016, the start of the 2016 federal election campaign
- Type: Daily newspaper
- Owner(s): Nine Entertainment Co. (since 2018)
- Founders: William McGarvie; Alfred Ward Stephens; Frederick Stokes
- Publisher: Nine Entertainment Co.
- Editor: Jordan Baker
- Deputy editor: Liam Phelan
- Associate editor: Deborah Snow
- Managing editor: Monique Farmer
- Photo editor: Mags King
- Staff writers: 700+
- Founded: April 1831; 195 years ago
- Language: English
- Headquarters: 1 Denison Street, North Sydney, Australia
- Circulation: 231,232 (2018) (Note: Print circulation)
- Readership: 808,000 (weekly)
- Sister newspapers: The Sun-Herald; The Age
- ISSN: 0312-6315
- OCLC number: 226369741
- Website: smh.com.au

The Sydney Morning Herald (SMH) is a daily newspaper owned by Nine Entertainment published in Sydney, Australia, in tabloid format. Founded in 1831 as the Sydney Herald, the Herald is the oldest continuously published newspaper in Australia and claims to be the most widely read masthead in the country. It is considered a newspaper of record for Australia. Its sister publication is The Age, published in Melbourne.

The newspaper is published in compact print form from Monday to Saturday as The Sydney Morning Herald and on Sunday as its sister newspaper, The Sun-Herald and digitally as an online site and app, seven days a week. The print edition of The Sydney Morning Herald is available for purchase from many retail outlets throughout the Sydney metropolitan area, most parts of regional New South Wales, the Australian Capital Territory and South East Queensland.

== Overview ==
The Sydney Morning Herald publishes a variety of supplements, including the magazines Good Weekend (included in the Saturday edition of The Sydney Morning Herald); and Sunday Life. There are a variety of lift-outs, some of them co-branded with online classified-advertising sites:

- The Guide (television) on Mondays
- Good Food (food) and Domain (real estate) on Tuesdays
- Money (personal finance) on Wednesdays
- Drive (motoring), Shortlist (entertainment) on Fridays
- News Review, Spectrum (arts and entertainment guide), Domain (real estate), Drive (motoring) and MyCareer (employment) on Saturdays

The executive editor is James Chessell and the editor is Jordan Baker. Tory Maguire is national editor, Monique Farmer is life editor, and the publisher is chief digital and publishing officer Chris Janz.

Former editors include Bevan Shields, Darren Goodsir, Judith Whelan, Sean Aylmer, Peter Fray, Meryl Constance, Amanda Wilson (the first female editor, appointed in 2011), William Curnow, Andrew Garran, Frederick William Ward (editor from 1884 to 1890), Charles Brunsdon Fletcher, Colin Bingham, Max Prisk, John Alexander, Paul McGeough, Alan Revell, Alan Oakley, and Lisa Davies.

== History ==
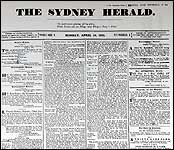
The cover of the newspaper's first edition, on 18 April 1831

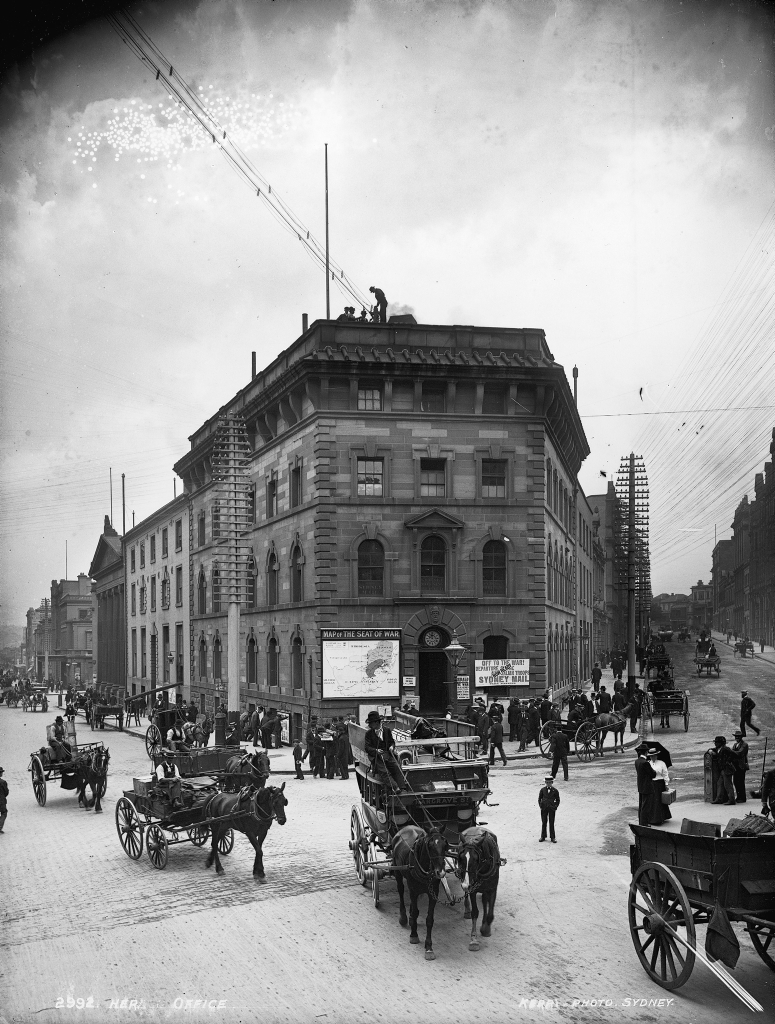
Sydney Morning Herald building on the corner of Pitt and Hunter Streets, built 1856, demolished in the 1920s for a larger building

The Sydney Herald was founded in 1831 by three employees of the now-defunct Sydney Gazette: Ward Stephens, Frederick Stokes, and William McGarvie. A Centenary Supplement (since digitised) was published in 1931. The original four-page weekly had a print run of 750. The newspaper began to publish daily in 1840, and the operation was purchased in 1841 by an Englishman named John Fairfax who renamed it The Sydney Morning Herald the following year. Fairfax, whose family were to control the newspaper for almost 150 years, based his editorial policies "upon principles of candour, honesty and honour. We have no wish to mislead; no interest to gratify by unsparing abuse or indiscriminate approbation".

Donald Murray, who invented a predecessor of the teleprinter, worked at the Herald during the 1890s. A weekly "Page for Women" was added in 1905, edited by Theodosia Ada Wallace.

The SMH was late to the trend of printing news rather than just advertising on the front page, doing so from 15 April 1944. Of the country's metropolitan dailies, only The West Australian was later in making the switch. The newspaper launched a Sunday edition, The Sunday Herald, in 1949. Four years later, this was merged with the newly acquired Sun newspaper to create The Sun-Herald, which continues to this day.

By the mid-1960s, a new competitor had appeared in Rupert Murdoch's national daily The Australian, which was first published on 15 July 1964.

John Fairfax & Sons Limited commemorated the Herald's 150th anniversary in 1981 by presenting the City of Sydney with Stephen Walker's sculpture Tank Stream Fountain.

In 1995, the company launched the newspaper's web edition, smh.com.au. The site has since grown to include interactive and multimedia features beyond the content in the print edition. Around the same time, the organisation moved from Jones Street to new offices at Darling Park and built a new printing press at Chullora, in the city's west. The SMH later moved with other Sydney Fairfax divisions to a building at Darling Island.

In May 2007, Fairfax Media announced it would be moving from a broadsheet format to the smaller compact or tabloid-size, in the footsteps of The Times, for both The Sydney Morning Herald and The Age. After abandoning these plans later in the year, Fairfax Media again announced in June 2012 its plan to shift both broadsheet newspapers to tabloid size, with effect from March 2013. Fairfax also announced it would cut staff across the entire group by 1,900 over three years and erect paywalls around the papers' websites. The subscription type was to be a freemium model, limiting readers to a number of free stories per month, with a payment required for further access. The announcement was part of an overall "digital first" strategy of increasingly digital or online content over printed delivery, to "increase sharing of editorial content," and to assist the management's wish for "full integration of its online, print and mobile platforms."

On 22 February 2014, the Saturday edition was produced in broadsheet format for the final time, with this too converted to compact format on 1 March 2014, ahead of the decommissioning of the printing plant at Chullora in June 2014.

In June 2022, the paper received global coverage and backlash to an attempted outing of Australian actress Rebel Wilson by columnist Andrew Hornery, and the subsequent defence of his since-deleted column by editor Bevan Shields; Wilson pre-empted the Hornery disclosure with an Instagram post confirming her relationship.

In November 2025, Shields resigned as editor and handed the job over to political editor Jordan Baker in the beginning of 2026.

=== Daily Life Woman of the Year ===
In 2012, Woman of the Year (WOTY) awards were created by the editor of the Daily Life section, Sarah Oakes, inspired by the sexism faced by former prime minister Julia Gillard. Winners were selected as the result of voting by the public as well as a panel of judges appointed by Fairfax. Winners have included:

- 2012: Julia Gillard
- 2013: "ADFA Kate" (an RAAF cadet, victim of the "Skype sex scandal" at the Australian Defence Force Academy)
- 2014: Rosie Batty
- 2015: Gillian Triggs
- 2016: Mariam Veiszadeh

== Editorial stance ==
The contemporary editorial stance of The Sydney Morning Herald is generally centrist. It has been described as the most centrist of Australia's three major news publications (the others being The Australian and The Age). In 2004, the newspaper's editorial page stated: "market libertarianism and social liberalism" were the two "broad themes" that guided the Herald's editorial stance. During the 1999 referendum on whether Australia should become a republic, the Herald (like the other two major papers) strongly supported a Yes vote. It also endorsed the Yes vote for the 2023 Australian Indigenous Voice referendum.

The Sydney Morning Herald did not endorse the Labor Party for federal office in the first six decades of Federation, always endorsing a conservative government. The newspaper has since endorsed Labor in seven federal elections: 1961 (Calwell), 1984 and 1987 (Hawke), 2007 (Rudd), 2010 (Gillard), 2019 (Shorten), 2022 (Albanese), and 2025 (Albanese).

During the 2004 Australian federal election, the Herald did not endorse a party, but subsequently resumed its practice of making endorsements. After endorsing the Coalition at the 2013 and 2016 federal elections, the newspaper endorsed Bill Shorten's Labor Party in 2019, after Malcolm Turnbull was ousted as prime minister.

At the state level, the Herald has consistently backed the Coalition; the only time since 1973 that it has endorsed a Labor government for New South Wales was Bob Carr's government in the 2003 election, though it declined to endorse either party three times during this period.

The Herald endorsed Democratic candidate Hillary Clinton in the run-up for the 2016 U.S. presidential election.

The Herald endorsed the Liberal-National Coalition in the run-up for the 2023 New South Wales state election.

In May 2023, the Herald opposed the extradition of former WikiLeaks editor Julian Assange to the United States, with the newspaper conducting a poll that found 79% oppose Assange's extradition to the United States.

In 2024, the Herald supported the presidential candidacy of Kamala Harris during that year's presidential election in the United States.

=== Myall Creek coverage and apology ===
As The Sydney Herald, the newspaper's editorial stance at times reflected racist attitudes within the colony, with the paper urging squatters across Australia to emulate the mass killing of Native Americans. The front page of the paper on 26 December 1836 read: "If nothing but extermination will do, they will exterminate the savages as they would wild beasts." In the wake of the Myall Creek massacre in which at least twenty-eight unarmed Wirraayaraay men, women and children were murdered by a group of white stockmen, the paper published a long letter from a squatter in defence the killings. The squatter described the Indigenous inhabitants of Australia as "the most degenerate, despicable, and brutal race of beings in existence", writing: "they will, and must become extinct – civilization destroys them – where labor and industry flourish, they die!" The Herald's editorialisation on the trials contrasted with other newspapers which were more respectful on the matter and on the notion of Aboriginal Australians being protected under the law as British subjects, the same as settlers. In 2023, the paper apologised for its coverage of the massacre and the subsequent trials of the perpetrators.

== Notable contributors ==
=== Writers ===
- Waleed Aly
- Eliza Ashton
- Louisa Atkinson
- Julia Baird
- Lucian Boz
- Mike Carlton
- Anne Davies
- Peter FitzSimons
- Ross Gittins
- Richard Glover
- Peter Hartcher
- Amanda Hooton
- Adele Horin
- H. G. Kippax
- Amy Mack
- Louise Mack
- Roy Masters
- Kate McClymont
- Anne Summers
- Michael Visontay

=== Illustrators ===
- Simon Letch, named as one of the year's best illustrators on four consecutive occasions.

== List of journalists ==
=== Current journalists ===
This is a list of The Sydney Morning Herald's current journalists.

Name	Role	Other roles	Start year at Nine / Fairfax
James Massola	National affairs editor	Previously South-East Asia correspondent	
Callan Boys	Good Food Guide editor (SMH); Restaurant critic for Good Weekend; Good Food writer		
Paul Sakkal	Federal political reporter	Same role at The Age	
Lisa Visentin	Federal political reporter	Same role at The Age	
Angus Thompson	Federal political reporter (industrial relations)	Same role at The Age	
Monique Farmer	National Managing Editor	Same role at The Age	
David Swan	Technology Editor	Same role at The Age	

=== Former journalists ===
The below is a list of The Sydney Morning Herald's former journalists.

After 40 years as art critic, John McDonald was sacked in September 2024.

Name	Role	Other roles	Start year at Nine / Fairfax
Gail Williams	Food columnist	Same role at The Sunday Times	

== Ownership ==
Fairfax went public in 1957 and grew to acquire interests in magazines, radio, and television. The group collapsed spectacularly on 11 December 1990 when Warwick Fairfax, who was the great-great-grandson of John Fairfax, attempted to privatise the group by borrowing $1.8 billion. The group was bought by Conrad Black before being re-listed in 1992. In 2006, Fairfax announced a merger with Rural Press, which brought in a Fairfax family member, John B. Fairfax, as a significant player in the company. From 10 December 2018, Fairfax Media merged into Nine Entertainment, making the paper a sister to the Nine Network's TCN station. This reunited the paper with a television station; Fairfax had been the founding owner of ATN, which became the flagship of what became the Seven Network.

== Content ==
=== Column 8 ===
Column 8 is a short column to which Herald readers send their observations of interesting happenings. It was first published on 11 January 1947. The name comes from the fact that it originally occupied the final (8th) column of the broadsheet newspaper's front page. In a front-page redesign in the lead-up to the Sydney Olympic Games in 2000, Column 8 moved to the back page of the first section from 31 July 2000. As at February 2024, the column is the final column on the Opinion (editorial and letters) pages.

The content tends to the quirky, typically involving strange urban occurrences, instances of confusing signs (often in Engrish), word play, and discussion of more or less esoteric topics.

The column is also sometimes affectionately known as Granny's Column, after a fictional grandmother who supposedly edited it. The column's original logo was a caricature of Sydney Deamer, originator of the column and its author for 14 years.

It was edited for 15 years by George Richards, who retired on 31 January 2004. Other editors besides Deamer and Richards have been Duncan Thompson, Bill Fitter, Col Allison, Jim Cunningham, Pat Sheil, and briefly, Peter Bowers and Lenore Nicklin. The column is, as of March 2017, edited by Herald journalist Tim Barlass, who frequently appends reader contributions with puns; and who made the decision to reduce the column's publication from its traditional six days a week, down to just weekdays.

=== Opinion ===
The Opinion section is a regular of the daily newspaper, containing opinion on a wide range of issues. Mostly concerned with relevant political, legal and cultural issues, the section presents work by regular columnists, including Herald political editor Peter Hartcher, Ross Gittins, and occasional reader-submitted content. Iconoclastic Sydney barrister Charles C. Waterstreet, upon whose life the television workplace comedy Rake is loosely based, had a regular humour column in this section.

=== Good Weekend ===
Good Weekend was launched in May 1978, as part of Saturday's Herald; it became a separate magazine supplement in October, 1984 appearing in both SMH and The Canberra Times. The editor was Valerie Lawson, and Cyprian Fernandes was founding chief sub-editor.

It is now distributed with both The Sydney Morning Herald and The Age in Saturday editions. It contains, on average, four feature articles written by its stable of writers and others syndicated from overseas as well as sections on food, wine, and fashion. Writers include Stephanie Wood, Jane Cadzow, Melissa Fyfe, Tim Elliott, Konrad Marshall, and Amanda Hooton.

Other sections include "Modern Guru", which features humorous columnists including Danny Katz responding to the everyday dilemmas of readers; a Samurai Sudoku; and "The Two of Us", containing interviews with a pair of close friends, relatives or colleagues.

Good Weekend is edited by Katrina Strickland. Previous editors include Ben Naparstek, Judith Whelan (2004–2011) and Fenella Souter.

=== "Resolve" polling ===
The Resolve Political Monitor (RPM) is conducted by Resolve Strategic on behalf of SMH and The Age, with data collected monthly from a national sample, and the results published in both papers. The data is collected via 400 random telephone interviews and 600 online interviews, with a notional error margin of around 2.2%. Run by Jim Reed, the polling began in 2021. The poll is frequently quoted by other outlets, such as The Conversation, along with other polls such as Newspoll and Roy Morgan polls.

== Digitisation ==
The paper has been partially digitised as part of the Australian Newspapers Digitisation Program project of the National Library of Australia.

== Awards ==
In March 2024, David Swan, technology editor of SMH and The Age, won the 2023 Gold Lizzie for Best Journalist of the Year at the IT Journalism Awards. He also won Best Technology Journalist and Best Telecommunications Journalist, and was highly commended in the Best Technology Issues category. With The Age, SMH also won Best Consumer Technology Coverage and were highly commended in the Best News Coverage category.

== See also ==
- List of oldest companies in Australia
- Journalism in Australia
- List of newspapers in Australia
- The Sydney Mail – weekly magazine of The Sydney Morning Herald, published from 1860 to 1938
- List of magazines in Australia
- List of newspapers in Britain
