= Taifa Leo =

- Type: Newspaper
- Owner: Nation Media Group
- Founded: 1958
- Language: Swahili
- Country: Kenya

Taifa Leo is the only Swahili-language newspaper published from Kenya. It was founded in 1958. Taifa Leo means "Nation Today" in Swahili.

Taifa Leo is published by the Nation Media Group. From 2012 to February 2018, its content was published on the Swahili website www.swahilihub.com. Under the leadership of renowned award-winning editor Faustine Ngila, the paper changed its website to taifaleo.nation.co.ke to gain more online visibility. It has since been Kenya's source of online Swahili content, publishing current affairs, politics, features and sports. The newspaper publishes daily pull outs from Monday to Sunday. The most common ones are Jamvi on Sundays, Dimba on Mondays, Lugha na Elimu on Wednesdays and Akilimali on Thursdays.

In 2019, it introduced a new health reportage magazine called Afya, published every Tuesday. The youth can enjoy entertainment content every Friday on a pullout known as Bambika. It is best known for Swahili entertainment content especially 'Dondoo za Hapa na Pale', 'Wazo Bonzo' and 'Shangazi' which are tools of emotional relief especially the laughter that comes from funny love stories. It is known for spearheading the learning of Swahili language in both primary and secondary schools through evaluation tests published on the paper and Insha competitions.

In recent years, it has been known for its bold political splashes that question Kenya's tolerance of corruption and poor governance. Many Swahili scholars use Taifa Leo as a tool for the literature review in Swahili language development. The current boss is Peter Ngare, who took over from Nicholas Muema in January 2018.
