= Cybercrimes Act in Tanzania =

Law criminalizing cybercrime offences

The Tanzania Cybercrimes Act of 2015 was enacted by the National Assembly of Tanzania in April 2015, and signed into law by the fourth president of the United Republic of Tanzania, Jakaya Mrisho Kikwete on 25 April 2015. The law makes provisions for criminalizing offences related to computer systems and Information Communication Technologies; provides for investigation, collection, and use of electronic evidence in Tanzania Mainland and Zanzibar except to article 50 which do not operate in Zanzibar. The Law further criminalizes and penalizes a number of cyber activities such as data espionage, publication of child pornography, publication of pornography, publication of false, deceptive, misleading or inaccurate information, production and dissemination of racist and xenophobic material, initiating transmission of or re-transmission of unsolicited messages and violation of intellectual property rights and other types of cybercrimes. This law came after significant impacts such as financial loss, fraud and cyber bullying to the public and other stakeholders.

== Enforcement. ==
The official statistics about the trend of cybercrimes in Tanzania are hard to find but some Tanzania government officials have claimed reduction of the high rate of cybercrime, theft or fraud in the country since the government enacted the legislation in 2015. As a result of the law, statements from government officials in the news media claim that the number of suspected criminals arrested has rapidly increased. However a section of the media and activists have complained that the law gives power to the police than the common citizen

== Challenges ==
=== Perceived Suppression of Freedom of Expression ===
Several complaints about the enforcement of Tanzania Cybercrimes law have been expressed by Tanzania civil society groups, scholars development partners, and the opposition parties in Tanzania. Specifically, the opposition political parties in Tanzania have voiced their concern about the government's use of the law to suppress the fundamental rights on freedom of expression and using the law to target the opposition political parties. Several instances have been reported on people being arrested for expressing their opinions on social media, for example one citizen deemed to have insulted the president of Tanzania through social media. Another case that underscores the perception of suppression of freedom of expression by the government is the arrest and subsequent charging under the Cybercrimes law, of a Tanzanian web based social forum founder for failing to reveal the identities of the commenters on his forum.

=== Common Citizen's Awareness of the Law ===
After enacting the law, the government embarked on various awareness campaigns. Despite their efforts, a common citizen in Tanzania may have heard of the law because several cases frequently feature in the news media. However, the majority of cyber crime incidents go unreported to the police.

== Proposals for Review ==
There have been attempts to challenge parts of the Cybercrimes Act through the courts and through the parliamentary process by several stakeholders. The news media frequently reports about the governments willingness to review the law and come up with future regulations relating to cybercrimes.
