= Analytical feminism =

Line of philosophy

Analytical feminism is a line of philosophy that applies analytic concepts and methods to feminist issues and applies feminist concepts and insights to issues that have traditionally been of interest to analytic philosophers. Like all feminists, analytical feminists insist on recognizing and contesting sexism and androcentrism.

== History ==
The term "analytical feminism" dates back to the early 1990s when the Society for Analytical Feminism was opened in at the University of Massachusetts Lowell. It is used as an opportunity to discuss and examine issues concerning analytical feminism, in part to contrast the more prevalent influences of postmodernism and post-structuralism, and also to demonstrate that analytic philosophy is neither inherently or irredeemably male-biased. Analytic feminists have attempted to rehabilitate certain key concepts, such as truth, reason, objectivity, agency and autonomy, both because they are normatively compelling as well as in some ways liberating and empowering for women. Not limited to these concepts, analytical feminism has contributed to the historical arena of analytic philosophy such as the philosophy of language, epistemology, metaphysics and the philosophy of science.

In 1995, the American philosophical magazine Hypatia published a special issue clarifying the meaning of analytic feminism in the mainstream Anglo-American analytical context and in the range of feminist philosophical positions. In this issue, the authors such as Ann Cudd, then with the University of Kansas, Ann Garry of California State University Los Angeles, and Lynn Hankinson Nelson of the University of Washington proposed that analytic feminism typically was unrecognized and somewhat depreciated by not only analytical philosophers but academic feminist agenda as well. Considered a sub-category of both analytic philosophy and feminism, analytic feminism acknowledges the philosophical traditions of both fields while simultaneously addressing prominent issues within said fields.

== Philosophical approach ==
Analytical feminism, as defined by Ann E. Cudd: "Analytic feminism holds that the best way to counter sexism and androcentrism is through forming a clear conception of and pursuing truth, logical consistency, objectivity, rationality, justice, and the good while recognising that these notions have often been perverted by androcentrism throughout the history of philosophy." (1996: 20) Analytic feminists engage the literature traditionally thought of as analytic philosophy, but also draw on other traditions in philosophy as well as work by feminists working in other disciplines, especially sociology and biology. They, like most analytic philosophers, value clarity and precision in argument and tend to use more rigorously structured logical and linguistic analysis in reaching their conclusions and positions as compared to other philosophical approaches.

The majority of philosophers, including feminist philosophers, have at least some formal training in analytic philosophy, with some possessing extensive education and experience regarding analyticity. There has been a conscious effort to use the word 'analytical', the reason being that within the field of philosophy there is sometimes an inclination to assume all feminist work as tied to other methods to philosophy, whereas upon review much of the work in feminism is closer in method to analytic conventions.

According to most analytic feminists, the best method for scholars to counter sexism and androcentrism in their respective areas of inquiry is by forming a clear conception of and practicing logical consistency and neutrality.

=== Doctrines ===
Even though analytical feminists retain only some traditional concepts, it is not doctrinaire—indeed, there is even a spirit of contrarianism within it. Nevertheless, analytic feminists share a thing that we may call a "core desire" rather than a core principle, that is to say, the need to hold on to enough of the essential normative notions of the modern European tradition to aid the kind of normativity which is necessary for both feminist political theory and philosophy. This "core desire" finds its appearance by means of the core concepts of analytical feminism.

=== Bridge building ===
Analytic feminists' use of core ideas and their excerpt to the work of traditional analytic philosophers permit them to communicate with and build bridges amongst different types of scholars, for example, traditional analytic philosophers, other feminist philosophers, and, in some cases, scientists or scholars in social studies.

=== Reconstructing philosophy ===
One tenet of analytic feminism holds that if philosophers positions are applicable universally, they must be usable by men and women alike, and from a range of social situations. This is a basis for what can be considered the reconstruction of philosophy via analytic feminism. This approach, which somewhat mirrors the construction of feminist philosophy tradition, attempts to limit the creation of areas or categories of philosophy that apply to only some women and feminists. It's an attempt to apply to 'all' (men and women) instead of 'some' (women and/or feminists) with specific examples of topics being feminine ethics, gynocentric ethics, or lesbian ethics. The basis for this universal approach would be an analytic feminist ethics and metaphysics which would create and establish a new criterion of adequacy for the fields of ethics and metaphysics. The goal of Miranda Fricker and Jennifer Hornsby, editors of The Cambridge Companion to Feminism in Philosophy, is to have this position included in the mainstream of the discipline (Fricker and Hornsby 2000).

Not basing the approach on any 'essential' characteristics, be they experiences or otherwise, it can maintain the importance of a variety of perspectives, while crafting a 'working' theory. 'Working' is defined as being particularly inclusive, of both men and women, but also simultaneously eliminating oppressive consequences. A wide range of experiences, interests, and background must be reflected with the theory 'working' only if it is applicable to all these issues and concerns.

There are a variety of approaches regarding the reconstruction of philosophy within analytic feminism. Some philosophers, such as Bailey (Bailey 2010) and Gary (Garry 2012), include the use of intersectionality in their approach. Miranda Fricker (2007) and Kristie Dotson (2011) make use of concept of privilege in theirs, particularly with regard to epistemic ignorance and epistemic injustice. In 2018, Alice Crary offered a critique of some of these recent trends in analytic feminism.
