= Eugene Mbugua =

Kenyan television producer (born 1986)

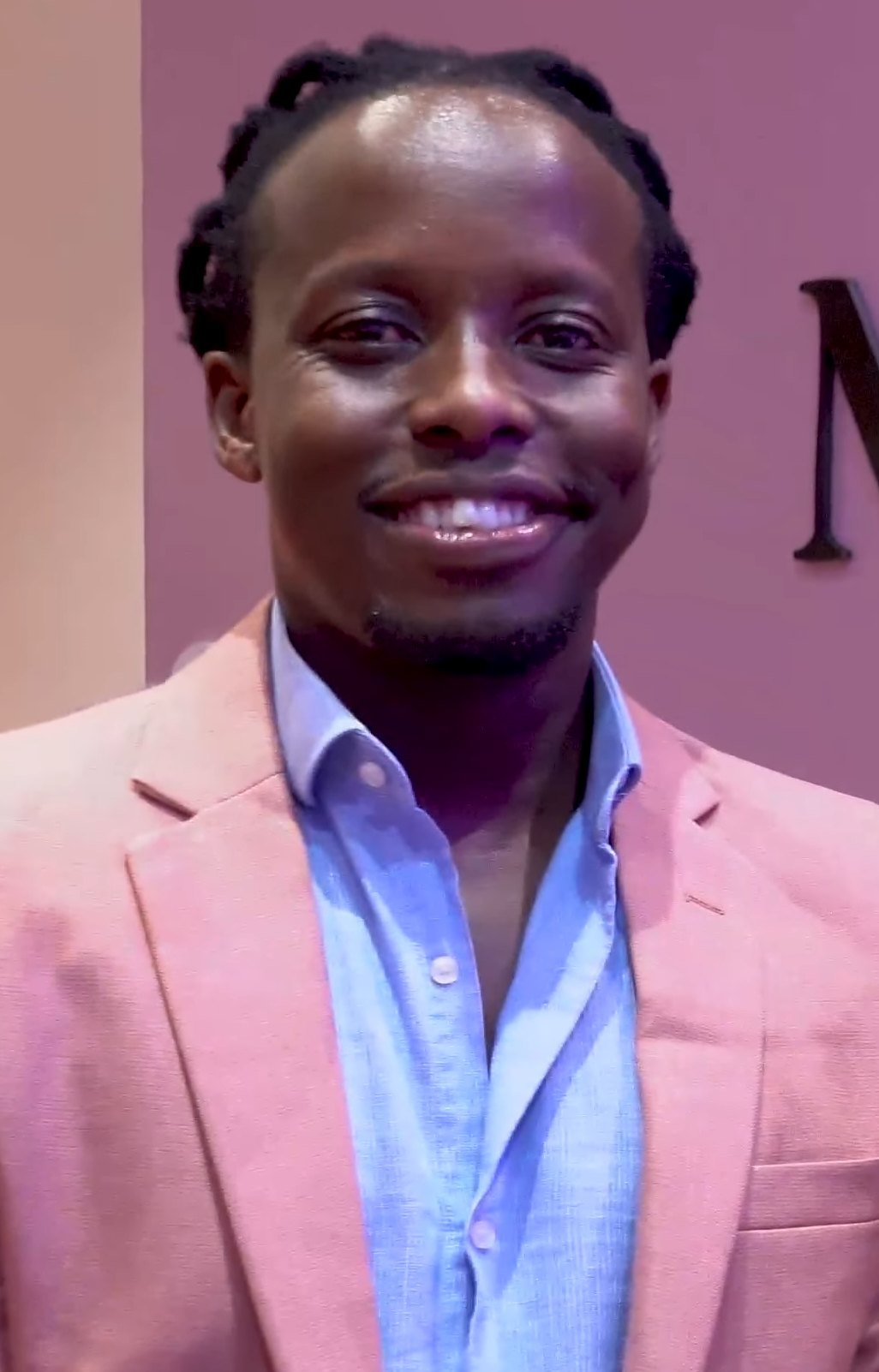
- Mbugua in 2025
- Born: 22 November 1990 (age 35)
- Education: United States International University-Africa
- Occupation: Television producer
- Years active: 2013-present
- Organization(s): Documentary and Reality Television Limited
- Notable work: Real Housewives of Nairobi

Eugene Mbugua (born 22 November 1990) is a Kenyan television producer. He is known for creating the shows Young Rich and producing reality shows like Sol Family, Being Bahati, The Real Housewives of Nairobi and The Mommy Club NBO.

== Early life and education ==
Mbugua attended Upper Hill Boys High School in Nairobi, Kenya. In high school, he was part of a student-owned canteen, which sold snacks during breaks. After high school, Mbugua was an extra on the local television show Inspekta Mwala, which aired on Citizen TV. He was also a boom-swinger on local television shows Makutano Junction which aired on NTV station and Machachari on Citizen TV. He attended the United States International University-Africa (USIU), Nairobi where he pursued a bachelor's degree in television production and print media.

== Career ==
In 2013, Mbugua founded Documentary & Reality Studios (D&R Studios), a production company specializing in documentaries and reality storytelling. Young Rich, the company's first production released that same year, made Mbugua, then 22 years old, the youngest producer in Kenya to have a show on national television. The two-year series followed young, successful Kenyan entrepreneurs over eight seasons.

In 2016, Mbugua released the first season of Our Perfect Wedding. The Showmax reality series, which follows Kenyan couples as they plan their wedding, celebrated its 17th season in 2024. In 2018, Mbugua produced Being Bahati, a reality show on the Kenyan gospel musician Bahati and his family. It was the first Kenyan celebrity reality show.

In 2019, D&R Studios released Foods of Kenya on KTN. The series showcased Kenyan local foods and traditions as well as dance and culture. After a 2-year hiatus, the series returned for a second season in February 2021.

In 2020, Mbugua produced the reality show Sol Family which followed the lives of the Kenyan Afropop band Sauti Sol and members of their record label Sol Generation Records. That same year, in collaboration with the Kenya Film Association, Mbugua produced Concert Nyumbani. The televised event showcased performances of various Kenyan artists during the COVID-19 pandemic and aired on local TV stations that included K24, KTN, NTV, KBC and Switch TV.

2021 saw the release of Mbugua's next celebrity-driven reality show Our Love, based on Kenyan musicians Nameless and Wahu, which premiered on Showmax on 24 May. Mbugua next followed up with Kyallo Culture, a 13-episode reality series following the media personality Betty Kyallo and her sisters in 2022. It ranked as one of the top-10 shows on Showmax that year. Season 2 was released the following year.

In 2023 Mbugua's The Real Housewives of Nairobi, an international installment of The Real Housewives, aired on Showmax, followed by its second season release in 2024.

In 2024, he developed and produced The Hot Seat, a comedy roast tv series for Showmax that debuted in December.

In April 2025, the distributor Rushlake Media and D&R Studios announced a partnership in which the German company would distribute D&R Studio's content in North America and Europe.

In May 2025, Showmax announced that D&R Studios will be producing Kenyan edition of the Mommy Club Franchise, titled The Mommy Club NBO that premiered on May 30 on the African streamer.

== Other Business Ventures ==
Mbugua owns Number 7, a nightclub in Nairobi.

== Awards and recognitions ==
- In 2014, Business Daily listed Eugene Mbugua in the Top 40 Men Under 40 2014.
- In 2014, he won a Kalasha Award in the best editor category for the film Child Hire
- In 2016, Forbes Africa, listed him in the 30 Most Promising Young Entrepreneurs In Africa
- In 2017, he was listed in Forbes Africa 2017's class of 30 under 30.
- In 2024, Africapitol named him as one of the 50 most influential executive leaders in Kenya.
