= The Hot Seat (TV series) =

2025 Kenyan television series

- Genre: Roast comedy
- Created by: Eugene Mbugua
- Written by: Various
- Directed by: Geoffrey Wanyeki; Jessica Mwangi; Joel Ndirangu; Kelvin Black; Charles Winchez
- Starring: Emmanuel Kisiangani; Ruth Nyambura; George Waweru; Maina Munene; Oluoch Kariuki; Bashir Halaiki; Marcus Douglas; Stan Saleh; Tonio Kibz; Ty Ngachira
- Country of origin: Kenya
- Original languages: English and Swahili
- No. of seasons: 1
- No. of episodes: 13

Production
- Producer: Eugene Mbugua
- Running time: 40-60 minutes
- Production companies: D&R Studios

Original release
- Network: Showmax
- Release: 3 December 2024 – 25 February 2025

The Hot Seat is a 2024 Kenyan comedy‑roast television series produced by D&R Studios, founded by Eugene Mbugua. The first two episodes debuted on Showmax on 10 December 2024, followed by weekly releases.

The show features Kenyan celebrities including Sauti Sol’s Savara, Andrew Kibe, content creator Kabi WaJesus, media personality Willis Raburu, musician Willy Paul, and comedians Terence Creative, Eddie Butita, and Eric Omondi.

== Plot ==
The Hot Seat is a Kenyan comedy television series in the style of a roast featuring Kenyan celebrities. The show is hosted by a team of stand-up comedians who present material about a new celebrity guest in each episode. The roast show features some of Kenya's biggest celebrities and media personalities including comedian Terrence Creative, content creator Kabi Wa Jesus, media personality Willis Raburu, Andrew Kibe, musician Willy Paul, comedian Eddie Butita, Sauti Sol's Savara and more.

== Series overview ==
Series	Episodes	Originally released	
Series	Episodes	First released	Last released
1	13	3 December 2024	25 February 2025

=== Season 1 (2024) ===
Roastee	Roast master(s)	Original release date
Terrence Creative	Emmanuel Kisiangani	3 December 2024
Roasters: Marcus Kariuki, George Waweru, Ty Ngachira, Ruth Nyambura, Oluoch Kariuki, and Bashir Halaiki.
Willis Raburu	Emmanuel Kisiangani	3 December 2024
Roasters: Titus Mutai, Kinuthia SK, Arnold Saviour, Ty Ngachira, Bashir Halaiki, and Prof Hamo.
Kabi wa Jesus	Emmanuel Kisiangani	10 December 2024
Roasters: Ruth Nyambura, Gakonyo Gathimba, Ty Ngachira, Nathan Rerei, Bashir Halaiki, and George Waweru. Notable audience members: Milly Wa Jesus
Andrew Kibe	Emmanuel Kisiangani	17 December 2024
Roasters: Bashir Halaiki, Ruth Nyambura, Maina Munene, George Waweru, and Ty Ngachira.
Eddie Butita	Emmanuel Kisiangani	24 December 2024
Roasters: George Waweru, Nelly Wangeci, Maina Murumba, Ty Ngachira, and Bashir Halaiki.
Savara	Emmanuel Kisiangani	7 January 2025
Roasters: Stan Saleh, Maina Munene, Tonio Kibz, Ruth Nyambura, Bashir Halaiki, and Ty Ngachira.
Willy Paul	Emmanuel Kisiangani	14 January 2025
Roasters: Prof. Hamo, Nick Kwach, Maina Munene, Ty Ngachira, Bashir Halaiki, and Jack Nanjero.
Eric Omondi	Emmanuel Kisiangani	21 January 2025
Roasters: David Macharia, Ruth Nyambura, Bashir Halaiki, George Waweru, and Amandeep Jagde as they go all in on the "President of Comedy" himself, Eric Omondi.
Pierra Makena	Bashir Halaiki	28 January 2025
Roasters: Mike One, George Waweru, Emmanuel Kisiangani, Maina Munene, and Nelly Wangechi take aim at the multi-talented DJ, actress, and TV personality. From her legendary DJ mixes to her award-winning acting, no topic is off-limits! Will the queen of the decks handle the heat, or will she drop the mic?
YY Comedian	Emmanuel Kisiangani	4 February 2025
Roasters: Featuring the trailblazing Ruth Nyambura, Nelly Wangeci, Ty Ngachira, George Waweru, Bashir Halaiki, and the roast master Emmanuel Kisiangani; they dish it out cold to YY Comedian on the hot seat. The legendary comedian and media personality's life from dating and career is up for a hot roast!
MC Jessy	Emmanuel Kisiangani	11 February 2025
Roasters: George Waweru, Adan Abdi, Ty Ngachira, Bashir Halaiki, and Maina Munene.
Mejja	Emmanuel Kisiangani	18 February 2025
Roasters: Marcus Douglas, David Maina, George Waweru, Ty Ngachira, and Bashir Halaiki.
Frankie Just Gym It	Emmanuel Kisiangani	25 February 2025
Roasters: Bashir Halaiki, Nelly Nyambura, George Waweru, Maina Munene and Ty Ngachira.

== Production ==
=== Development ===
The show was developed by Eugene Mbugua as a follow-up to his 2022 show Roast House, which also debuted on Showmax. Shot at Alloys Bar & Lounge, it features upcoming comedians in Kenya. Emmanuel Kisiangani serves as MC for most episodes, except during the roast of Pierra Makena.

== Critical Response ==
Stanslaus Manthi of Business Daily Africa described the show as "sharp, unfiltered, and unapologetically Kenyan" in his review, stating: "The Hot Seat is brutal in the best way. It is like a slaughterhouse where egos go to die. The fact that the show is homegrown makes it even better."
