= The Mommy Club NBO =

Kenyan TV series

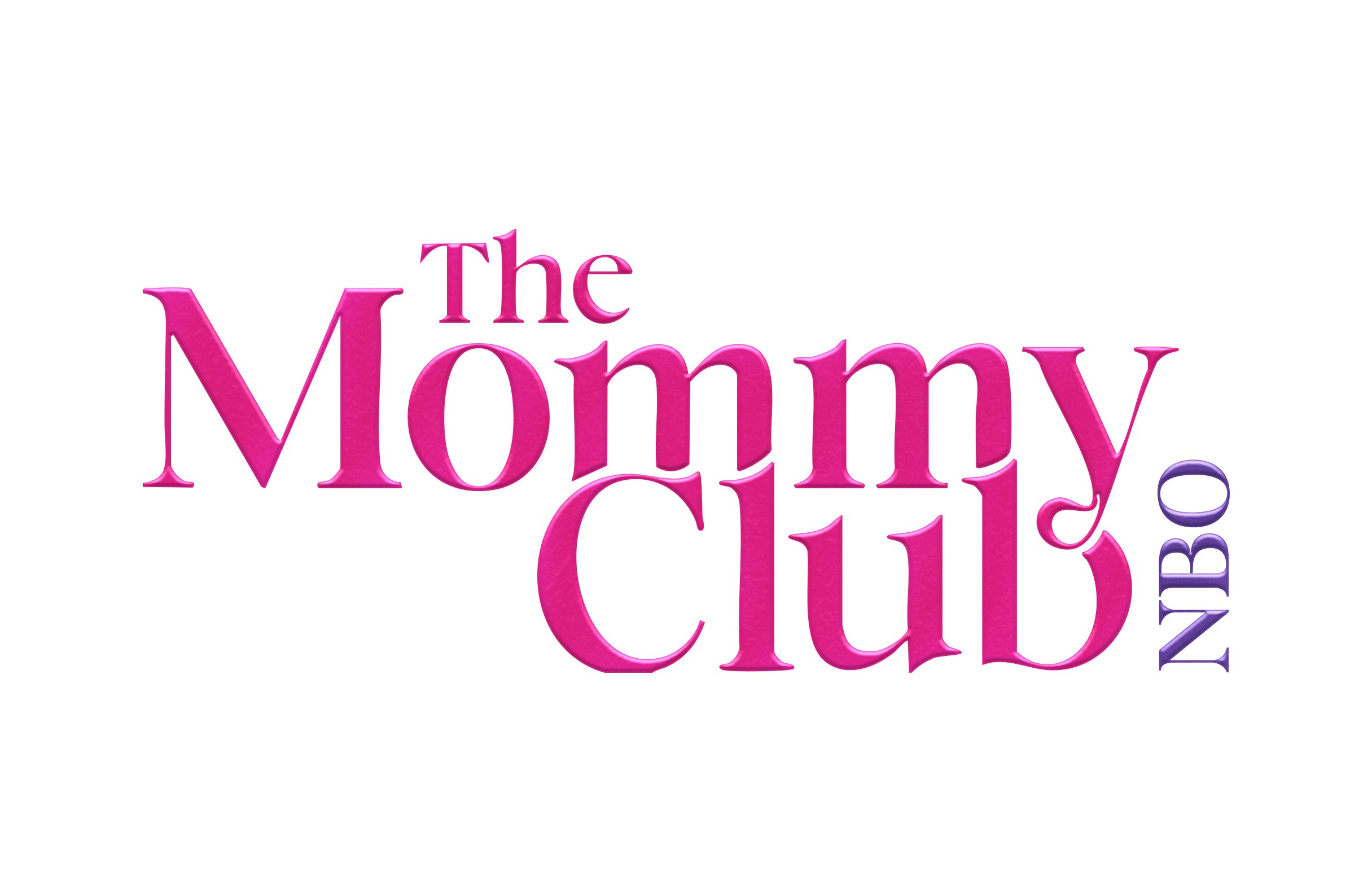
- Genre: Reality television
- Developed by: Eugene Mbugua
- Directed by: Jessica Mwangi
- Starring: Jackie Matubia; Ofentse Tsipa; Carey Priscilla; Pierra Makena; Lynne Njihia
- Country of origin: Kenya
- Original languages: English; Swahili
- No. of seasons: 1
- No. of episodes: 13

Production
- Executive producer: Eugene Mbugua
- Producer: Caroline Ngujiri
- Running time: 45 - 60 minutes
- Production company: D&R Studios

Original release
- Network: Showmax
- Release: 30 May 2025 – present

Related
- The Mommy Club

The Mommy Club NBO is a 2025 Kenyan reality television series produced by Eugene Mbugua for Showmax. The show is the fifth installment of The Mommy Club franchise and documents the lives of five Kenyan affluent mothers.

The show premiered on May 30, 2025 and features actress Jackie Matubia, DJ Pierra Makena, make-up artist and entrepreneur Carey Priscilla, South Africa-born life coach Ofentse and Eric Omondi's ex-fiance Lynne Njihia.

== Plot ==
Mommy Club gives a glimpse into the lives of five affluent Kenyan mothers as they navigate parenting, ambition, and glamour in Nairobi.

== Cast ==
- Jackie Matubia, Kalasha-nominated actress, digital content creator, and influencer. She is a mom of two.
- Pierra Makena, Kenyan DJ and actress who shares a close bond with her charismatic daughter.
- Carey Priscilla, digital creator, model, and founder of Carey Beauty School, with two branches in Nairobi. She is the mother of two sons and one daughter.
- Lynne Njihia, she is a 24-year-old mother of one daughter and ex-fiancée to comedian Eric Omondi. She is a brand influencer, content creator, commercial model, and dancer.
- Ofentse Tsipa, South African-born life coach living in Kenya with her Dutch husband and their two children, a son and a daughter. She is also sister to Shaka Ilembe’s Lemohang Tsipa.

Lemohang Tsipa and Eric Omondi also appear in the show.

== Series overview ==
Season	Episodes	Originally released	
Season	Episodes	First released	Last released
1	13	May 30, 2025	Ongoing

=== Season 1 (2025) ===
No.	Title	Directed by	Original release date
1	"Opening Hearts at High Tea"	Jessica Mwangi	30 May 2025
Introductions bloom and impressions are made as the mamas meet for an elegant high tea gathering.
2	"Baby Steps and Boundaries"	Jessica Mwangi	6 June 2025
The little ones get their own rooms while the mamas define their personal space. The group learns the gentle art of setting limits.
3	"Mimosas, Milestones & Missteps"	Jessica Mwangi	13 June 2025
A colourful brunch leaves the mamas disappointed, and a play date spat gets out of hand. Will Jackie and Lynne come to an understanding?
4	"Expanding Dreams & Finding Harmony"	Jessica Mwangi	20 June 2025
As businesses grow, the ladies learn to navigate conflict resolution and tricky dance moves. Ofentse attempts to defuse the situation.
5	"Pilates, Prayer & Passion"	Jessica Mwangi	27 June 2025
Core strength meets soul strength in Jackie's spicy pilates and Carey's Bible study - and for dessert, Pierra gets the mamas on the dance floor.
6	"Brushes With Friendship"	Jessica Mwangi	4 July 2025
A makeup class by Carey sparks underlying tensions, but heartfelt apologies help the mamas find their colours again. Pierra tells her side of the story.
7	"Mother Knows Best"	Jessica Mwangi	11 July 2025
After dark adventures and a crash course in modern-day marriage and romance. Carey's mother makes a vibrant appearance to offer much-needed advice.
8	"Healing Sessions & Promises Ahead"	Jessica Mwangi	18 July 2025
Couples' therapy breakthroughs, Pierra's house-hunting jitters, and the promise of a gesture of love in the air.
9	"Circle Of Trust & Fresh Starts"	Jessica Mwangi	25 July 2025
Ofentse's group therapy uncovers fresh bonds as old disagreements finally find their end. New friendships are formed.
10	"Straight Shooters, Lovers & Friends"	Jessica Mwangi	1 August 2025
A day at the gun range tests confidence while a high-stakes proposal question looms.
11	"A Toast To Queens"	Jessica Mwangi	8 August 2025
The mamas reminisce about how time flies, moving on with grace and raising a toast to what comes next.
12	"Reunion Part 1"	Jessica Mwangi	29 August 2025
13	"Reunion Part 2"	Jessica Mwangi	5 September 2025

== Production ==
=== Development ===
The Mommy Club NBO was announced in early May 2025 ahead of its premiere later in the month. The show is produced by Eugene Mbugua, the masterminds behind The Real Housewives of Nairobi.

== Release ==
Showmax is set to release the first episode on 30 May, and subsequent episodes being available on the streaming platform every Friday.

The show had its premiere on 29th May at Aspire Centre Westlands and was attended by all cast members as well as the show production team.
