= Reckless =

Reckless may refer to:

== Film and television ==
=== Film ===
- Reckless (1935 film), an American musical directed by Victor Fleming
- Reckless (1951 film), a Spanish drama film directed by José Antonio Nieves Conde
- The Reckless, a 1965 Italian drama film directed by Giuliano Montaldo
- Reckless (1984 film), an American romantic drama directed by James Foley
- Reckless (1995 film), an adaptation of the play by Craig Lucas (see below), directed by Norman René
- Reckless (2014 film), a Dutch film directed by Joram Lürsen
- Reckless (2018 film), an Italian comedy film directed by Marco Ponti

=== Television ===
- Reckless (British TV series), a 1997 British drama serial
- Reckless (American TV series), a 2014 legal drama series
- Reckless (Australian TV series), a 2025 Australian crime comedy-drama series
- Reckless (Kenyan TV series), a 2025 Kenyan TV drama series
- "Reckless" (Combat Hospital), an episode
- "Reckless" (Holby City), an episode
- "Reckless" (The Flash), an episode
- "Reckless" (The Ranch), an episode

== Literature ==
- Reckless, a 1983 play by Craig Lucas
- Reckless (von Ziegesar novel), a 2006 young adult novel by Cecily von Ziegesar
- Reckless (Funke novel), a 2010 young adult novel by Cornelia Funke
- Reckless (Gross novel), a 2010 novel by Andrew Gross
- Reckless: My Life as a Pretender, a 2015 memoir by Chrissie Hynde

== Music ==
=== Albums ===
- Reckless: 1979–1995, by Australian Crawl, 2000
- Reckless (Bryan Adams album) or the title song, 1984
- Reckless (Jeremy Camp album) or the title song, 2013
- Reckless (Luther Allison album), 1997
- Reckless (Martina McBride album) or the title song, 2016
- Reckless (Nav album) or the title song, 2018
- Reckless (Special D. album) or the title song, 2004
- Reckless (The Sports album) or the title song, 1978
- Reckless (SteelDrivers album), 2010

=== Songs ===
- "Reckless" (Afrika Bambaataa song), 1988
- "Reckless" (Alabama song), 1993
- "Reckless" (Australian Crawl song), 1983
- "Reckless" (Chris "The Glove" Taylor & David Storrs song), featuring Ice-T, 1984
- "Reckless" (Jeremy Camp song), 2012
- "Reckless" (Madison Beer song), 2021
- "Reckless" (Tilly and the Wall song), 2006
- "Reckless", by Anastacia from Evolution, 2017
- "Reckless", by Atreyu from Long Live, 2015
- "Reckless", by Crystal Castles from Crystal Castles, 2008
- "Reckless", by Firebeatz and Joeysuki, 2012
- "Reckless", by J, 2008
- "Reckless", by J Hus from Big Conspiracy, 2020
- "Reckless", by Judas Priest from Turbo, 1986
- "Reckless", by Lacuna Coil from Black Anima, 2019
- "Reckless", by Papa Roach from The Paramour Sessions, 2006
- "Reckless", by Sammy Hagar from Musical Chairs, 1977
- "Reckless", by St. Vincent from All Born Screaming, 2024
- "Reckless", by Wizkid from Made in Lagos, 2020
- "Reckless", by You Me at Six from Sinners Never Sleep, 2012
- "Reckless", by Young Stoner Life from Slime Language 2, 2021
- "Reckless", from the film Reckless, 1935

== Other uses ==
- Battle of Hollandia, code name Operation Reckless, a World War II battle in northern New Guinea
- Reckless (surname)
- Sergeant Reckless (c. 1948–1968), a war horse that held official rank in the United States military
- Nikola Reckless, a cancelled electric tactical military vehicle

== See also ==
- Charles the Bold (1433–1477), Duke of Burgundy, also translated as Charles the Reckless
- Reck (disambiguation)
- Recklessness (disambiguation)
- Wreckless (disambiguation)
