= Eva Modika =

South African television personality

Eva Mapula Modika is a South African television personality, entrepreneur, socialite radio Dj and model. She is a cast member of Showmax's reality show Diamond and Dolls.

== Background ==
Eva Modika began her career as a news anchor for Sedibeng FM in 2013. She later moved to Johannesburg, where she rose to prominence as an events host, hosting in popular clubs and elite events across South Africa between 2016 and 2017. She subsequently gained a significant following on social media through trending. In 2022 she co-produced and cast for Diamond and Dolls which premiered on Showmax in March 2022. She established a cosmetic brand called Pretty Much Beauty SA in February 2022. Eva got extensive media attention when she underwent 360 liposuction procedure on her stomach and a Brazilian Butt Lift (BBL) cosmetic surgery to enhance her figure in May 2022 in Turkey.
