= Diamond and Dolls =

- Genre: Reality
- Created by: Tebogo Ramokgadi
- Directed by: Dimi Raphoto
- Country of origin: South Africa
- Original language: English
- No. of seasons: 1
- No. of episodes: 6

Production
- Executive producers: Tebogo Ramokgadi, Joran Molapo
- Production location: Johannesburg
- Running time: 24-30 minutes

Original release
- Network: Showmax, Apple TV
- Release: 7 March 2022 – present

Diamond and Dolls is a South African reality drama series that airs on Showmax. The show is produced by Tebogo Elesta Ramokgadi.

Tebogo Elesta Ramokgadi is a South African television producer, stylist and musician.

In the reality TV series, Diamond and Dolls, the cast members live a lifestyle as they pursue fame and money as event hosts and influencers.

== Cast ==
- Eva Modika
- Paloma Mlunjwana
- Luminitsa Jemwa
- Innocencia Morolong
- Tebogo Ramokgadi
