= Wreckless =

Wreckless may refer to:

- Wreckless: The Yakuza Missions, a video driving game set in Hong Kong
- Wreckless (film), a 1935 American film directed by William A. Shilling

== See also ==
Reckless
