= Eric Omondi =

Kenyan comedian and actor (born 1982)

- Born: March 9, 1982 (age 44); Kisumu County
- Education: Daystar University
- Notable work: Saratina

Comedy career
- Years active: 2006 - Present

Eric Omondi (born 9 March 1982) is a Kenyan comedian and actor. He made his comedy debut in Churchill Show, a comedy show that airs on NTV in 2008. He has since won three African Entertainment Awards USA for 'Best Comedian' in 2018, 2019 and 2020.

== Early life and education ==
Omondi is the second-born in a family of four in Kisumu County. He attended Kondele Primary School then Kisumu Boys High School. He later joined Daystar University and pursued a course in Mass Communication and Journalism.

== Marriages and family ==
Omondi had once promised to marry his Italian girlfriend Shantal following their public engagement after being together for nearly five years. However, in 2018 the couple announced their breakup.

Kenyan journalist Jacque Maribe has publicly stated that she shares a son with Omondi. In 2021, Omondi mentioned that he requested for a DNA test to confirm paternity which he claimed Maribe had not honored.

Omondi shares a daughter with his ex fiancée Lynne Njiha. The couple broke up in 2025.

== Career ==
Omondi started his career with a brief stint as a news reporter for NTV Kenya before meeting Daniel Ndambuki in 2006. He broke into the limelight in 2008 after he made an appearance on NTV's Churchill Show. In 2015, he left the show, to host his own show called Hawayuni, which aired on KTN but was short-lived. He also did ‘Somewhere in Africa’ and ‘Untamed’.

In March 2017, Omondi became the first Kenyan ever to appear on The Tonight Show Starring Jimmy Fallon.

In 2020, he introduced a controversial show dubbed 'Wife Material' with its first season coming to an end with a wedding with Band Beca's Carol. The second season featured women from Kenya, Tanzania and Uganda which saw him arrested. The show was later suspended by the Kenya Film and Classification Board (KFCB). Omondi was awarded the title of Comedian of the Year by African Entertainment Awards, USA (AEAUSA) for a third consecutive time in 2020.

Omondi has since expressed his interest to get into politics.

In early 2026, Omondi actively campaigned for the Lang'ata Constituency parliamentary seat in the upcoming 2027 Kenyan general elections, declaring his intention to run as an independent candidate."Eric Omondi Leads Lang'ata MP Race: New 2026 Opinion Poll". Mpasho. 2026-02-20. A February 2026 opinion poll by Politrack Africa showed him leading potential contenders with 40.2% support if the election were held at that time."LANG'ATA MEMBER OF PARLIAMENT OPINION POLL {19th FEB 2026}". Politrack Africa. 2026-02-18."Jalang'o Urges Eric Omondi to Contest for Embakasi East MP Seat, Not Lang'ata". Tuko.co.ke. 2025-11-03. (Note: Earlier reports from late 2025 show incumbent responses to his declared interest.)

== Activism ==
In February 2023, Omondi with 16 other people demonstrated against the high cost of living outside Parliament, Nairobi Kenya. They were charged with taking part in an unlawful assembly. They were later released with cash bail of KES 10,000 each.

Eric Omondi was also arrested by police on April 26, 2023 while protesting against unemployment and high cost of living in Kisumu. In the incident, Omondi led a group of protestors, with majority of them being university students, in the streets of Kisumu protesting the persistent unemployment affecting most graduates in the Kenyan society. Anti-riot police arrested the comedian and hurled tear gas canisters to disperse the peaceful protestors.

On February 10, 2026 Eric started a walk from Nairobi to Mombasa, to raise money for the Sisi kwa Sisi initiative.

== Awards ==
In 2011 he received the best performance in a comedy award at the 3rd Kalasha International Film and TV Awards.

Year	Award	Category	Nominee(s)	Result	Ref.
2018	African Entertainment Awards USA	Best African Comedian	Himself	Won	
2019	African Entertainment Awards USA	Best African Comedian	Himself	Won	
2019	African Entertainment Awards USA	African King Of Comedy	Himself	Won	
2019	African Entertainment Awards USA	Best Host	Himself	Nominated	
2020	African Entertainment Awards USA	Best African Comedian	Himself	Won	
2021	African Entertainment Awards USA	Media Personality of the Year	Himself	Nominated	
2021	African Entertainment Awards USA	Social Media Influencer of the Year	Himself	Nominated	
2021	African Entertainment Awards USA	Best African Comedian	Himself	Nominated	
