= Pierra Makena =

Kenyan disc jockey, actress and TV personality

- Born: Meru District, Kenya
- Citizenship: Kenyan
- Occupations: Disc jockey, Actress and TV personality.
- Years active: 2010- present
- Children: 1
- Awards: 2017 Best Supporting Actress at Nollywood and African Film Critics Awards
- Website: pierramakena.com

Pierra Makena is a Kenyan disc jockey, actress and TV personality. She won best supporting actress for her role in When Love Comes Around at the annual Nollywood and African Film Critics Awards in Los Angeles.

== Early years and education ==
Makena was born in Meru, Kenya. She had her senior high school education at Chogoria Girls High School. She furthered at the Kenya Institute of Mass Communication where she studied radio production.

== Career ==
Although Makena began her acting career while in secondary school, she joined the Kenyan film and TV industry in 2005. While in school she performed in several festivals and won awards. Some of the movies she starred in that led to her breakthrough in acting include Kisulisuli, Tausi, Tahidi High, and Changes.

Her career as a disc jockey began in 2015 when she left Scanad Kenya Limited to help set up One Fm radio station. She is currently one of Kenya's most sought after and highly paid female deejays. She has played at international events in Burundi, Ghana, Nigeria, and America. She's the Founder of the Park and Chill event with most cars in Africa.

In 2025, she starred in the Showmax reality show The Mommy Club NBO alongside personalities Jackie Matubia, Ofentse, Lynne Njihia and Carey Priscilla.

== Personal life ==
Makena has one daughter.

== Filmography ==
- Kisulisuli
- Tausi (1995–2000) TV Series
- When Love Comes Around (2014)
- Changes (2011) TV Series
- Tahidi High
- Disconnect (2018 film) as Robin
- Just in Time (2021) as Njeri
- Villains in the Metropolis (2022) as Jullie
- The Mommy Club NBO

== Awards ==
- 2014 - She was nominated for the Ghana Movie Awards in the best actress African collaboration category for her role in the movie, When Love Comes Around.
- 2015 - She won the Best Supporting Actress at Nollywood and African Film Critics Awards in Los Angeles for her role in When Love Comes Around.
