= Devilsdorp =

- Genre: True crime; Docu-series
- Created by: Kristen Broberg, Wim Steyn
- Developed by: Kristen Broberg
- Directed by: David Enright
- Narrated by: Jana Marx
- Country of origin: South Africa
- Original languages: English; Afrikaans
- No. of seasons: 1
- No. of episodes: 4

Production
- Executive producer: Wim Steyn
- Production company: IdeaCandy

Original release
- Network: Showmax
- Release: 29 July 2021

Devilsdorp is a South African four-part true crime documentary television series directed by David Enright and narrated by Jana Marx. It depicts and analyses the 11 killings in Krugersdorp, West Rand by the group Electus per Deus (Chosen by God) between 2012 and 2016, dubbed the Appointment Murders and the Satanic Murders. It was released on Showmax on 29 July 2021.

An official companion podcast hosted by Nicole Engelbrecht was released alongside the series.

== Episodes ==
| No. | Title | Directed by | Original release date |
|---|---|---|---|
| 1 | "Halos in Hell" | David Enright | 29 July 2021 |
| 2 | "The Mind of a Killer" | David Enright | 29 July 2021 |
| 3 | "Mother Dearest" | David Enright | 29 July 2021 |
| 4 | "The Aftermath" | David Enright | 29 July 2021 |

== Production ==
Research for the project took place over the course of 18 months, incorporating real-life interviews. It was co-created and developed by Kristen Broberg and Executive Producer, Wim Steyn (IdeaCandy) and directed by David Enright. The series was edited by Nikki Comninos and Christiaan Scheepers. Jana Marx, an investigative journalist who wrote The Krugersdorp Cult Killings: Inside Cecilia Steyn's Reign of Terror, narrated, and was consulted for the series.

== Reception ==
Met with both critical and audience acclaim, the series broke the Showmax record for most watched hours in its first week of any series or film on the platform. Since Showmax was officially shut down on 30 April 2026, the series is only available on DSTV Stream. Only Three of the 4 episodes are listed on DSTV Stream

=== Awards and nominations ===
| Year | Award | Category | Nominee(s) | Result | Ref. |
|---|---|---|---|---|---|
| 2022 | South African Film and Television Awards | Best Made-for-TV Documentary | Devilsdorp | Won | |
| 2022 | South African Film and Television Awards | Best Achievement in Directing – Documentary | David Enright | Nominated | |
| 2022 | South African Film and Television Awards | Best Achievement in Editing – Documentary | Dr. Nikki Comninos, Christiaan Scheepers | Nominated | |
| 2022 | South African Film and Television Awards | Best Achievement in Cinematography – Documentary | Charl Fraser | Nominated | |
| 2022 | South African Film and Television Awards | Best Achievement in Sound – Documentary | Pressure Cooker Media | Nominated | |
