= Recklessness =

Recklessness may be:

- Recklessness (law), a legal term describing a person's state of mind when allegedly committing a criminal offence.
- Recklessness (psychology), a state of mind in which a person acts without caring what the consequences may be

== See also ==
- Reckless (disambiguation)
