= This Body Works for Me =

South African Reality TV show

- Genre: Reality
- Starring: Noluvuyo Sodela; Refiloe Molwantwa; Anele Mahlakatha; Prudence Matsweu; Samkelisiwe Nkwanyana; Wandile Ndlovu; Xoli Mfeka
- Country of origin: South Africa
- Original languages: isiZulu; English
- No. of seasons: 1
- No. of episodes: 20

Original release
- Network: Showmax
- Release: 23 November 2022

This Body Works For Me is a 2022 Showmax Original South African reality television series, starring Noluvuyo Sodela (known as. Bubbly), Refiloe Molwantwa (known as. Gina), Anele Mahlakatha (known as. Nelly), Prudence Matsweu (known as. Primadonna), Samkelisiwe Nkwanyana (known as. Samke), Wandile Ndlovu (known as. Wandi), and Xoli Mfeka (known as. Xoli).

== Plot ==
This show follows seven women who work in the South African adult entertainment industry.

== Overview and casting ==
- Noluvuyo Sodela - Bubbly
- Refiloe Molwantwa - Gina
- Anele Mahlakatha - Nelly
- Prudence Matsweu - Primadonna
- Samkelisiwe Nkwanyana - Samke

Samke created most of her content on onlyfans.

- Wandile Ndlovu - Wandi

Wandi is an OnlyFans content creator from the east of Johannesburg, in a town called Katlehong.

- Xoli Mfeka - Xoli

Xoli is a South African adult entertainer and Onlyfans content creator, who is famously known for her self-proclaimed status "biggest porn star in Africa".

== Series overview ==
Season	Episodes	Originally released	
Season	Episodes	First released	Last released
1	20	November 23, 2022	January 25, 2023

=== Season 1 (2022-23) ===
No.	Title	Original release date
1	"City Girls Flourishing In Adult Entertainment"	23 November 2022
This Body Works For Me explores the lives of several Slay Queens, showing the viewer the intricate dynamics of using their bodies to generate substantial income but also how they use it long term to sustain their family livelihoods.
2	"Porn Industry Scouting and Pregnancy Reveal"	23 November 2022
This Body Works For Me explores the lives of several Slay Queens, showing the viewer the intricate dynamics of using their bodies to generate substantial income but also how they use it long term to sustain their family livelihoods.
3	"Twitter Beefs and Stripper Club Wars"	30 November 2022
Samke's manager sets up a meeting between her and Xoli to squash some social media beef. Strippers, Nelly and Gina, get fired from the Summit strip club over a video leaked by Primadonna.
4	"Bras and Brawls At Wandi's Lingerie Party"	30 November 2022
Wandi hosts a lingerie dinner to bring all the ladies together, but the event quickly turns sour when Nelly and Gina finally confront Primadonna.
5	"Sultry Yoga With The Bounce Back Queens"	7 December 2022
Xoli sets up a yoga retreat to try and restore peace in the group after the big catfight. Will she manage to bring them together? Gina and Nelly bounce back with new jobs at a new strip club.
6	"A Mother's Love Can Change the World"	7 December 2022
Samke's mom comes to town and finally addresses her toxic upbringing and her plans to give full custody of her children to their fathers. Meanwhile, Gina discovers her mother knows about her lifestyle.
7	"Creating content at the next level"	14 December 2022
Samke confides in Primadonna and an unexpected friendship grows between the two ladies. Xoli and Wandi are filming their second adult film and plan to take things to the next level of entertainment.
8	"Back stabbers take credit and give blame"	14 December 2022
Gina finally confronts her ex-friend, Ivy, for revealing the truth about her stripper life to her parents. The friendship circles are divided and we get to see who has got whose back.
9	"Releasing daddy issues and letting go the of drama"	21 December 2022
Primadonna has a heart-to-heart with her mom about her daddy issues. Xoli invites all the ladies, excluding one drama queen, to her birthday party, yet more drama unfolds between an unexpected duo.
10	"Paying the high price for maturity"	21 December 2022
Primadonna decides to settle the beef between her, Gina and Nelly, but their meet-up takes an unexpected turn. Wandi and Samke get together to settle their differences and school each other on the hustle.
11	"Pamper Sessions and Deep Conversation"	28 December 2022
12	"Overstepping Family Boundaries"	28 December 2022
13	"The Road Trip Full of Games"	4 January 2023
14	"Drug Addictions and Some Truth or Dare"	4 January 2023
15	"Unsolicited Advise from a Mom"	11 January 2023
16	"Confrontations and Investigations Brewing"	11 January 2023
17	"Parenting with the Pregnant Teenager"	18 January 2023
18	"Frenemies Getting Closer"	18 January 2023
19	"Only The Strong Women Will Last"	25 January 2023
20	"Reunion Special"	25 January 2023

== Production ==
=== Development ===
On 24 July 2023, Showmax renewed the series for a second season. On 26 July 2023,The South African author Nokuthula Ngcobo, report Xoli Mfeka and Samke not returning for season 2.

=== Casting ===
On 16 November 2022, Showmax released the cast, with a line-up of Bubbly, Gina, Nelly, Primadonna, Samke, Wandi, and Xoli, for This Body Works For Me.

== Premiere and release ==
On 23 November 2022, This Body Works For Me premiered on Showmax. Two new episodes were released every Wednesday for 10 weeks, which ran from 23 November 2022 to 25 January 2023.
