= Lisa Christoffersen =

Interior designer and rally driver

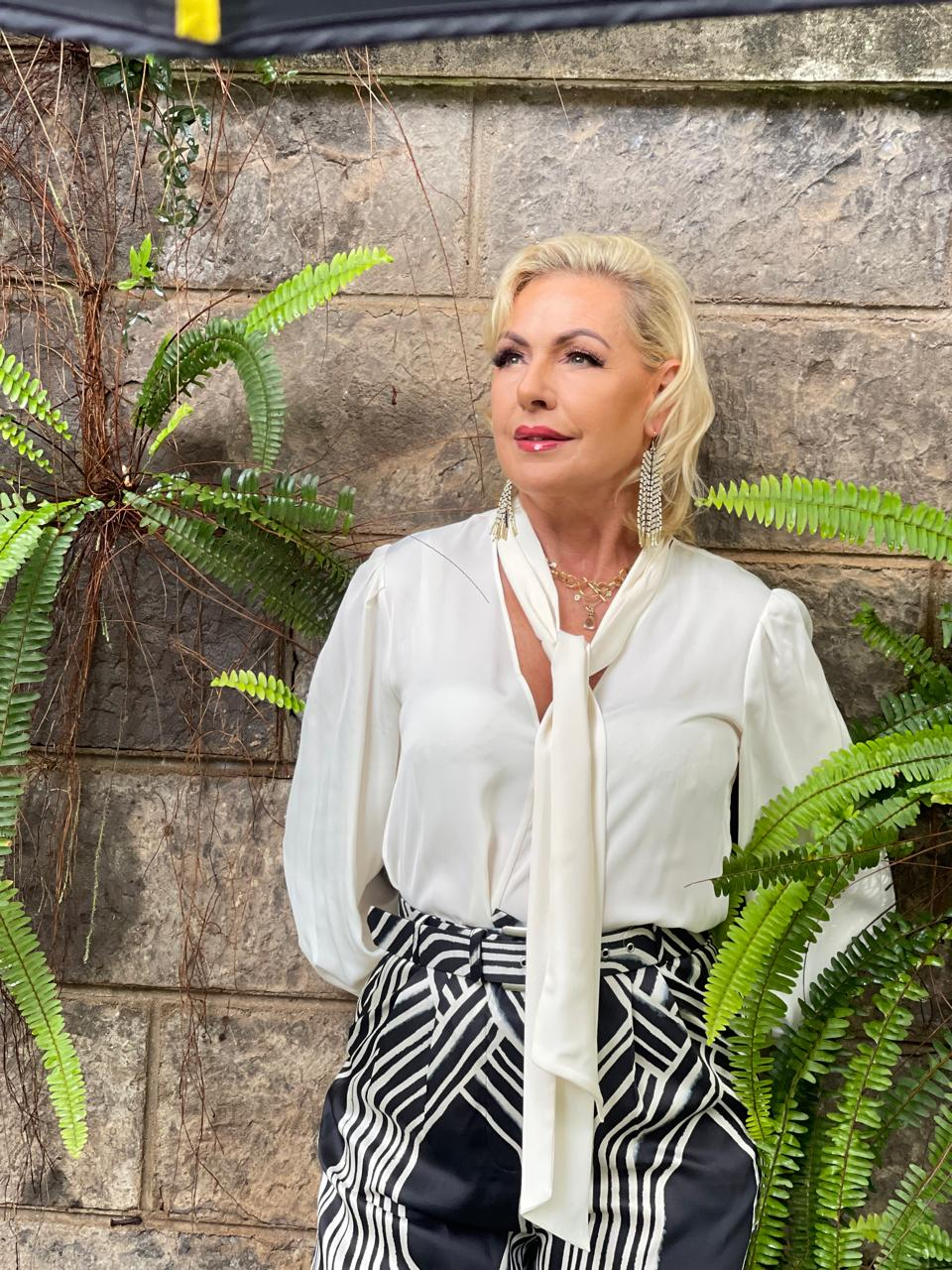
- Christoffersen in 2024
- Born: 1964 (age 61–62); Moshi, Tanzania
- Occupations: Interior designer, author, rally driver, reality television personality

Lisa Christoffersen (also known as Mama Chui) is a Kenyan interior designer, author, rally driver, and reality television personality. She is the founder of several art and design businesses and she has curated exhibitions in Nairobi.

She co-founded Kenya's all-women Lioness Rally and she competed in the 2024 Safari Rally as part of a women’s team. She was a cast member of The Real Housewives of Nairobi.

Christoffersen has written two books.

== Early life and education ==
Christoffersen was born in Moshi, Tanzania in 1964, at the foothills of Mount Kilimanjaro. She is a third-generation member of the Danish diaspora in East Africa. She spent some of her childhood in Arusha, where she studied for three years before moving to Denmark for further education.

== Career ==
Christoffersen’s first job was at Copenhagen Airport, working with Scandinavian Airlines. She later worked at Safari Park Hotel in Nairobi as an interior designer and in Tanzania as an operations manager for a tour company.

In 2001, Christoffersen founded Lisa Christofferson Art, an art gallery, followed in 2002 by Sanza Interiors, an interior design company in Nairobi. In 2020, she launched Lifestyle Nairobi, a lifestyle and design hub.

She has curated several exhibitions, including:

- Nairobi Serena Hotel exhibition (2014)
- Sarova Art Festival (2020), showcasing artists from Kibera
- African Inspirations exhibition at Fairmont The Norfolk (2019)
- Submerge, an underwater photographic exhibition at Serena Hotel (2020)

Christoffersen founded the Lioness Rally in 2022, Kenya’s first all-women motorsport event, to demonstrate women’s participation in rallying.

She competed in the 2024 annual Safari Rally as part of the government-backed Talanta Hela all-women team. She also competed in the Nanyuki Rally, racing in a Subaru Impreza.

In 2023, Christoffersen was the oldest person in The Real Housewives of Nairobi, a reality television series on Showmax.

== Books ==
- Bush Friendly Tips For Girls (Boys Too!) (co-author) ISBN 9789966050021
- A Monkey's Wedding (2022) ISBN 9789966955869

== Personal life ==
Christoffersen is a cancer survivor, she lives in Nairobi, where she manages her businesses
