= Betty Kyallo =

Kenyan news anchor and entrepreneur

- Born: Beatrice Mutwa Kyallo; 15 March 1989 (age 37); Kajiado District, Kenya
- Education: Daystar University (B.A. Mass Communication)
- Occupation: Journalist
- Years active: 2011–present
- Known for: Friday Briefing* (KTN), *Up Close with Betty* (K24), *Kyallo Kulture* (Showmax), *This Friday with Betty* (TV47)
- Notable work: Flair by Betty, BK Closet, Unapologetic by Betty
- Children: 2
- Relatives: Mercy Kyallo (sister), Gloria Kyallo (sister)
- Awards: SOMA Media Personality of the Year (2017), Africa Digital Influencer Award (2020)

Beatrice Mutwa Kyallo (born 15 March 1989), popularly referred to as Betty Kyallo, is a Kenyan media personality, television figure.and entrepreneur. She is best known for her work as a news anchor at KTN, K24, and currently TV47, as well as for her ventures in the beauty and fashion industries.

== Early life and education ==
Kyallo was born on 15 March 1989 in Kajiado County, Ongata Rongai. The second child in her family, she has two sisters (Mercy Kyallo and Gloria Kyallo) and one brother (Brian Kyallo). Her parents are Julia Ngii and Wilfred Kyallo. Her parents later separated but have both been present in most of her life milestones. She attended Olerai Primary School and Uhuru Gardens Primary School; later she joined Kangundo Girls High School for her secondary education. She went to Daystar University where she graduated with a Bachelor's degree in mass communication.

== Career ==
She joined Kenya Television Network where she worked as an intern, and was later taken in as a news anchor where she aired the 9 pm news on Fridays (the Friday Briefing).In the show, she could invite various guests and interview them. Later, she joined K24 where she aired the weekend 'Up Close with Betty' program. She quit K24 and started her own salon and spa business in Kilimani named Flair by Betty. In mid-2021 she started another business, Aftershave by Flair Barbershop and Bk Closet. On June 17, 2022, Showmax introduced Kyallo Kulture, a new Kenyan reality series about Betty Kyallo and her sisters Mercy and Gloria. In May 2024, Betty announced her comeback on TV as a news anchor after 4 years of taking a break.She will be the host of the show "This Friday with Betty" on TV 47 airing at 9 pm.

== Awards ==
- In 2017, SOMA awarded Betty Kyalo as the media personality of Kenya.
- In 2018 she emerged as the winner of the K0T 2018 Awards.
- In 2019, Kyallo was named the Most Influential Person in Media in Kenya by Avance Media, as part of their annual ranking of the 100 Most Influential Young Kenyans
- In 2020 she won the TV/online influencer award, in the Africa Digital Influencer Awards (ADIA20) event.
- In 2020, Betty was named among the 100 Most Influential Young Africans by Africa Youth Awards and Avance Media, recognizing her impact in media and entrepreneurship across the continent
- Top 200 Most Influential African Women on Twitter (2020)

== Personal life ==
She has one daughter by the name Ivanna with her ex-husband Dennis Okari.

In 2020 when the COVID-19 pandemic hit, Kyallo together with her sister and players of Nairobi City Stars were involved in a charity mission organised by the Jonathan Jackson Foundation (JJF).They gave out food and other necessities to families in need at Kibera.

Betty Kyalo married Internet personality Dennis Okari on October 2, 2015 in a private events-only ceremony held in Karen. However, the couple divorced six months later.

Betty Kyalo has faced several high-profile controversies over the years. In 2017, she was rumored to be dating former Mombasa Governor Ali Hassan Joho. However the two would break up and Betty would discuss their relationship later on. In 2023, Kyallo trended on social media due to rumors of a leaked private video. She addressed the claims by stating she would not respond to anything that cost her "peace of mind".

In April 2026, Betty gave birth to a second daughter.
