= Vera Sidika =

Kenyan model, video vixen and social media personality

- Born: 1989 (age 36–37)
- Occupations: video vixen; social media personality; socialite
- Years active: 2012–present
- Spouse: Brown Mauzo (separated)
- Children: 2

Instagram information
- Page: queenveebosset
- Years active: 2012-present
- Followers: 2.9 million

TikTok information
- Page: Vera Sidika
- Followers: 139 thousand

YouTube information
- Channel: VERA SIDIKA
- Years active: 2018-present
- Subscribers: 129 thousand
- Last updated: 1 May 2026

Verronicah Ciggi Johnston Shikwekwe Sidika is a Kenyan socialite. In 2015, she was among the socialites who began to appear in the reality television series Nairobi Diaries.

== Career ==
Sidika rose to fame in 2012 when she was featured as the video girl in P-Unit's single "You Guy". In 2014, she appeared in Prezzo's single, "My Gal". In November 2015, she appeared as a video vixen in a video by Nigerian musicians KCSkiibii and Harrysong titled "Ebaeno". In 2024, Vera was part of the reality TV series the Real Housewives of Nairobi for two seasons.

== Filmography ==
As of December 2015, Sidika and other Kenyan social media personalities, including fashion stylist Silvia Njoki, musician and actress Ella Ciru, NGO ambassador and student Gertrude Murunga, architect Kiki Diang’a, fitness instructor Marjolein Blokland and socialite and singer Pendo, starred in the reality television series Nairobi Diaries which delves into the women's day-to-day lives.

== Awards and nominations ==
Year	Association	Award	Result
2015	Pulse Music Video Awards	Best Video Vixen	Won
