= Nairobi Diaries =

Kenyan reality television series

- Genre: Reality television
- Created by: Janet Mwaluda
- Developed by: Nancy Wakio
- Written by: Janet Mwaluda
- Screenplay by: Janet Mwaluda
- Story by: Nancy Wakio; Mbuva Mwanyika
- Directed by: Ruth Mwende
- Creative director: Janet Mwaluda
- Theme music composer: James Machio; Oshea; Ella Ciru
- Country of origin: Kenya
- Original language: English
- No. of seasons: 10
- No. of episodes: 15

Production
- Executive producers: Janet Mwaluda; Nancy Mwaluda
- Producers: Brain Joseph; Ruth Mwende
- Production location: Nairobi
- Editor: Ruth Mwende
- Camera setup: Multi-camera
- Running time: 43 minutes
- Production company: Ink Media Production Compancy

Original release
- Network: K24
- Release: 14 December 2015 – present

Nairobi Diaries is a Kenyan reality television series that premiered on 14 December 2015 on K24. The one-hour show follows musician Noti Flow, fashion stylist Silvia Njoki, musician and actress Ella Ciru, NGO ambassador and student Gertrude Murunga, architect Kiki Diang’a, luwi singer and socialite and singer Pendo.

== Plot ==
The show follows the lives and lavish lifestyles of Kenyan socialites. It goes into their private lives, focusing on their struggles and side hustles to maintain such expensive lifestyles.

== Cast ==
- Trap King Chrome
- Noti Flow
- Marjolein Blokland
- Kiki Diang’a
- Mishi Dorah
- Serah Molly
- Andrew Lemayian
- Wairimu Muigah
- Vera Sidika
- Pendo Stacey
- Kiki Kasera

== Series overview ==
Season	Episodes	Originally aired	
Season	Episodes	First aired	Last aired
1	15	14 December 2015	21 March 2016
2	13	4 April 2016	27 June 2016
3	—N/a	—N/a	—N/a
4	—N/a	—N/a	—N/a
5	—N/a	—N/a	—N/a
6	—N/a	—N/a	—N/a
7	—N/a	—N/a	—N/a
8	—N/a	—N/a	—N/a
9	—N/a	—N/a	—N/a
10	21	4 May 2020	28 September 2020

According to show creator, Janet Mwaluda, each episode cost Ksh 450,000 to 500,000.
