= Politrack Africa =

Kenyan political research and consumer insight company

Politrack Africa logo

Politrack Africa is a Kenyan political research and consumer insight company.

== History ==
In August 2023, Politrack Africa conducted a survey to examine the performance of senators in all counties in Kenya.

In March 2024, Politrack Africa conducted a national survey across 290 constituencies in Kenya to evaluate the performance of public officials under its Starleaders Awards, as reported by the Kenya Broadcasting Corporation. The study ranked interior Cabinet Secretary Kithure Kindiki as top-performing Cabinet Secretary.

According to Politrack Africa survey reported by Capital FM, Hassan Joho was ranked as best performing Cabinet Secretary. The study evaluated key governance functions, including decision making and implementation of government priorities. The study, conducted from November 19–26, 2024, used random sampling method ensuring balanced representation across age groups and regions with a national representative sample size of 1,068 respondents.

A report published by TV47 Digital on 21 February 2025, confirms Politrack Africa conducted a survey designed to assess the performance of Principal Secretaries. The poll conducted between 4 and 10 January 2025 to evaluate officials based on service delivery covered all 47 counties.

Organized by Politrack Africa, Starleaders Awards event was held on Friday, March 28, 2025. The ceremony brought together leaders from Senate, County Governments, National Assembly, and the Cabinet to recognise and celebrate leadership and performance across various fields of governance nationwide.

Between 15 and 25 September 2026, the Politrack Africa survey used a text-based technology platform to gather data from a large sample of 20,419 respondents across the country. The poll reported a 95 percent confidence level and a margin of error of plus or minus three percentage points.

In April 2026, Politrack Africa held its Starleaders Awards to recognize Kenyan public officials across national and county government tiers. During the event, Politrack Africa Chief Executive Officer John Benson highlighted the role of data-driven governance and public accountability in evaluating leadership performance ahead of the 2027 general election.

In October, TUKO.co.ke reported that Politrack Africa had distanced itself from an online poll concerning the 2027 Nairobi gubernatorial election, which circulated under the name 'Nairobi Online Decides' and featured Politrack Africa Logo.
