= Kondele =

- Satellite Town
- Location within Kenya
- Coordinates: 0°4′58″N 34°46′33″E
- Country: Kenya
- City: Kisumu City
- Town: Kondele town

Government
  - MCA: Joachim Oketch
- Elevation: 1,131 m (3,711 ft)

Population (2018)
  - Satellite Town: 48,000
  - Metro: 138,000
- Time zone: UTC+3 (EAT)
- Website: kisumu.go.ke

Kondele is a district of the city of Kisumu, the third largest city in Kenya, and the second largest city, after Kampala, in the Lake Victoria Basin. Kondele is the most densely populated of the three satellite towns of Kisumu metropolitan region, the others being Maseno and Ahero. It is Kisumu City's most notable region and cultural identifier and one of the most densely populated regions in Kisumu County, Kenya. It lies on the A1 road that connects Kisumu and Vihiga. The town is administered by the Kondele County Assembly ward, an administrative ward which is part of the wards that represent Kisumu Central constituency in Kisumu county assembly. The ward is represented by the Kondele Member of County Assembly.

In the 2009 census, its population was estimated at 48,000. Its large population has recently attracted local business investors despite a history of political violence associated with the region. The main businesses in the region include supermarkets, hotels, restaurants and apparel retail. The growing number of businesses attracted banks to the area, including Co-operative bank, Equity Bank and KCB Bank.

The return of a peaceful environment, combined with the development of a superhighway through the town led to increased economic activity, leading to increased land value. As of 2016, one acre of land was priced at an average of KES 10 million, up from KES 6 million in 2014.

== History ==
Kondele emerged as one of the spots in which people from Kisumu gathered to protest political discontent at the local and national level. The most remarkable protest can be traced back to 1969.

In February 1990, during the presidency of Daniel arap Moi, the foreign minister and a Luo Kenyan, Robert Ouko, was assassinated. Demonstrations were held both in Nairobi and in Kisumu. In Kisumu, demonstrators gathered in Kondele and marched to the CBD, and were met with live fire from the police.

In 1992, Kenya's struggle for multiparty democracy was at its peak. Demonstrations were held throughout the country. In Kisumu, demonstrations started in Kondele as people marched towards the CBD. They were met with the police who short live bullets and interrupted a school session in Kisumu Boys High School as protestors ran to take cover.

In 2005, Kenya's president was Mwai Kibaki. During his term in office, a campaign ensued for a referendum to change the constitution. Led by the opposition leader, Raila Odinga, Luos in Kisumu led other opposition supporters in rejecting the proposed constitution and riots ensued. Demonstrators in Kondele were once again met with live bullets, leading to several deaths. The opposition managed to mobilise enough support to thwart the proposal and a new constitution would only become a reality in 2010, following support from Raila and his supporters.

In 2007, Kenya had a general election. Following an earlier agreement between President Kibaki and Raila Odinga, the president was supposed to lead for one term then endorse Raila. However, when the president decided to run for a second term in office, tension ensued into what climaxed as a heated political campaign. Raila assembled a large team of leaders from across the nation and attracted a massive crowd of supporters. By evening of voting day, he was but guaranteed of the election results, as were his supporters. However, when the results came in at the wee hours of the following morning, Kibaki was declared the winner. Raila and his supporters declared the election rigged and the results stolen. Minutes later, Kondele was in full force of political demonstration, starting what resulted in a huge nationwide protest in which more than 1,000 people died.

In 2017, a repeat of the 2007 violence was repeated and a number of protesters were killed by live police bullets in Kondele.

== Economic activities ==
Kondele is mainly a slum with a majority of its population living below the UN's definition of poverty of less $2 per day. In the recent past, there has been an upsurge in the economic activity with the government aiming to lift it out of poverty as part of Kenya's agenda for Millennium Development Goals and Vision 2030. A majority of the businesses in the town are owned by Indians and Kikuyus.

It is also located near several banks situated within 2 kilometers in the Central Business District of Kisumu. The main economic activity of the region is retail trade as it has an open-air market for low-scale traders. Other economic activities include coffin and furniture craftsmanship, matatu transportation, hotels and restaurants.

Because of its recent developments, property values and rents have increased. One acre of land was marked at KES 10–20 million (approximately US$100,000) in 2016, up from about KES 6 - 8 million (approximately US$60,000) in 2014. The price of rental apartments has also gone up. Two-bedroom houses in Kondele were rented at KES 15,000–KES 20,000 (approximately US$150 to US$200) per month in 2016, up from Sh 10,000 (approximately US$100) in 2013.

== Geography ==
Kondele is geographically located in Kisumu, Kenya, Eastern Africa. The estates are located such that to the north of it is Riat Hills, and to the south is Manyatta, while Mambo Leo and Kibos lie to the East and South East respectively. To the west is Kibuye market. It is flat land with a gentle slope from the North West to the South East. There are no lakes or rivers in or through Kondele, although, as part of Winam Gulf, it has a close proximity to Lake Victoria, which lies less than 2 kilometers away to the west.

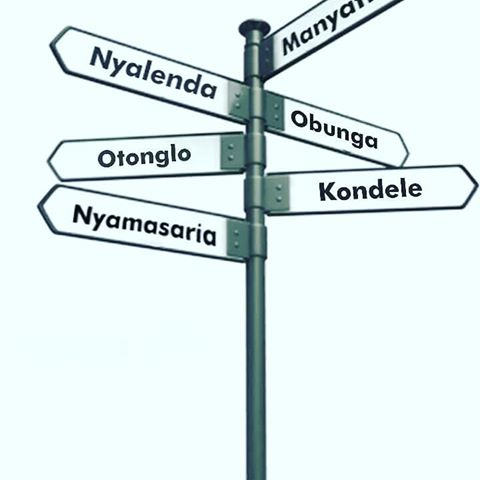
Road sign in Kondele showing various locations.

== Climate ==
The climate of Kondele is modified by the presence of Lake Victoria. The town has an annual relief rainfall that ranges between 1200 mm and 1300 mm in different sectors. The rain mainly falls in two seasons. As part of Kisumu, Kondele experiences thunderstorms, which are the major type of precipitation and normally occur in mid-afternoon during the rainy season. It is warm throughout the year with a mean annual temperature of 23 °C. The temperature ranges between 20 °C and 35 °C but seldom falls below 19 °C. The humidity is relatively high throughout the year

Sharing the same climate as Kisumu, it features a tropical rainforest climate with no true dry season and significant rainfall year-round. January is the driest month while the month of April receives the most rainfall. The average temperature is 22.9 degrees Celsius.

Climate data for Kisumu (1938–1990)
Month	Jan	Feb	Mar	Apr	May	Jun	Jul	Aug	Sep	Oct	Nov	Dec	Year
Mean daily maximum °C (°F)	30.6 (87.1)	30.8 (87.4)	30.4 (86.7)	28.8 (83.8)	28.2 (82.8)	27.9 (82.2)	27.7 (81.9)	28.2 (82.8)	29.4 (84.9)	30.5 (86.9)	30.1 (86.2)	29.9 (85.8)	29.4 (84.9)
Mean daily minimum °C (°F)	23.8 (74.8)	24.1 (75.4)	24.1 (75.4)	23.4 (74.1)	22.8 (73.0)	22.2 (72.0)	21.9 (71.4)	22.2 (72.0)	22.8 (73.0)	23.8 (74.8)	23.7 (74.7)	23.5 (74.3)	23.2 (73.8)
Average precipitation mm (inches)	79 (3.1)	84 (3.3)	169 (6.7)	213 (8.4)	167 (6.6)	85 (3.3)	85 (3.3)	81 (3.2)	90 (3.5)	95 (3.7)	139 (5.5)	101 (4.0)	1,388 (54.6)
Average precipitation days (≥ 1.0 mm)	7	10	11	17	13	8	7	8	8	10	13	9	121
Source: World Meteorological Organization

== Government and administration ==
Kondele town has two forms of governance and administration, the county government and the national. At the country or local level, it is administered as part of Kisumu county. In this sense, Kondele town is administered by Kondele County Assembly Ward. Kondele County assembly ward is an electoral ward in Kenya, the lowest form of county government introduced in 2010 at the passage of the new constitution. The ward is represented by a member of county assembly (MCA), who serves under the county governor. Both the MCA and the governor are elected by the people during national general elections. The current MCA for Kondele ward is Joackim Oketch, elected in office in 2017. The current governor for the region is Professor Peter Anyang' Nyong'o, also elected in office in 2017. According to the Kenya ward numbering system, it is ward number 1200.

At the national level, Kondele town is part of Kisumu Central constituency, constituency number 240 and one of the constituencies in Kenya that are represented in the national assembly (parliament) be elected members of parliament. Kondele town is made up various sub-locations, including Manyatta A sub-location and Kondele sub location. It is part of the Winam division, which in turn is part of Kisumu district. Kisumu district itself is part of Nyanza province, which made up one of the seven provinces in Kenya. The current MP for Kisumu central is Honourable Ken Obura, who was elected in the 2017 Kenyan general elections.

== Demographics ==
Kondele ward boasts a population of 48,000. It has a population density of 8,000–20,000 people per square kilometer. It is the most populated ward in Kisumu Central district, followed by Nyalenda ward. The following is a summary of population statistics of Kondele compared to the other regions within Kisumu central district.

- Kondele ward, population: 48,000
- Railways ward, population: 34,900
- Nyalenda ward, population: 32,000
- Market milimani ward, population: 18,900
- Shaurimoyo Kaloleni ward, population: 14,800

A majority of the populace in Kondele town are youths aged between 15 and 35 years old. The demographics of Kondele mirrors that of the major Kisumu area. The distribution between men and women in the region is nearly even.

The main ethnic group is Luo, which forms more than 98% of the entire population. Other ethnic communities in the town include Somalis, Indians, Kikuyus, Luhyas and Kalenjins. The main language spoken by the residents of Kondele is Dholuo.

== Security and Crime ==
Kondele has one police station, called Kondele police station. It is the second-largest police station in Kisumu, after Central police station. The station is headed by ...

Despite this, the region has been considered to have high levels of insecurity during political campaigns. Kondele's fame for its riots and civil unrests during elections dates back to the 1970s when the founding president of Kenya, Jomo Kenyatta, came to launch the first hospital in the region, JaramogI Oginga Odinga Teaching and Referral Hospital, then known commonly as Russia. Residents of Kondele demonstrated against perceived ethnic biases and tribalism showed to them by the president and earned their place in Kenya's political space as a hotspot during political campaigns.

In the 2007 Kenyan general elections, following the disputed presidential election results between Uhuru Kenyatta and Raila Odinga, Kondele erupted into a riot zone. Out of the 1,100 people that were killed in the aftermath of the elections, some of the victims were from Kondele.

In the 2017 Kenyan general election that was marked by violence and human rights violations, Kondele was once again at the center. Out of the 12 people that died, most of them were from this region.

== Education ==
Kondele location has a total of 33 schools, divided into 28 primary schools and five secondary schools. Some of the most notable primary schools include Manyatta primary school, Kondeleprimary school and Kosawo primary school. Some of the more notable secondary schools are St. Ignatius Loyola and Nyanza Christian Secondary school.

Kondele does not have any university. It has only one college, called Kenya Medical Training Center, Kisumu branch. However, it is within 2 kilometers of several universities and colleges, including University of Nairobi, Jomo Kenyatta University of Agriculture, and Maseno University. It is also within 2 kilometers of KCA University, Kisumu Polytechnic and a host of other colleges located within Kisumu's central business district. Because of the compulsory free primary education enforced in Kenya since 2003, a majority of residents of Kondele are able to communicate in English and Swahili and have basic reading and writing skills in these languages.

== Healthcare ==
=== Public healthcare ===
Public healthcare in Kondele is provided by Jaramogi Oginga Odinga Teaching & Referral Hospital, previously known as Nyanza provincial General Hospital, and popularly known as Russia, from its founding Russian sponsors.

=== Private healthcare ===
Private healthcare in Kondele is provided by private hospitals and clinics. The most notable ones include Nightingale hospital, Migosi Health Center and Rapha medical clinic. Additionally, there is a non-governmental organisation (NGO) sponsored hospital in the area called KMET.

== Portrayal in media ==
Kondele has been consistently portrayed negatively in the media. Because of its history of political violence, many media articles have termed it variously as a hotbed of terror, hot spot, or backyard of violence.

Because of its high unemployment rates, high poverty levels and a high number of sex workers and prostitutes, Kondele has been highly publicised in local media both for having a high rate of prostitution and for having some of the cheapest prostitutes in the country. Similarly, Kondele has drawn attention to national media for having one of the highest HIV and AIDS prevalence rates in the country. Further, it has also been notorious for its slum conditions.

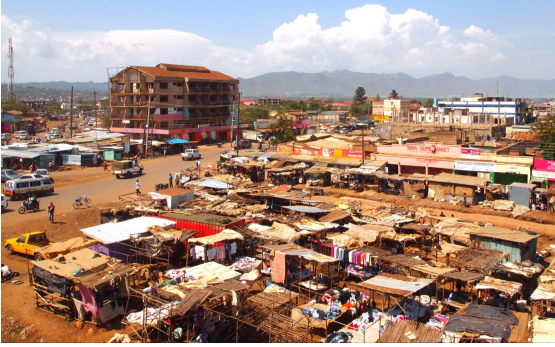
Kondele market c. 2010

The proposed infrastructural developments in 2013 have however led to some positive news coverage of the town. Various media outlets such as Daily Nation and Standard have reported on the rising developments in the region as a result of the new roads, hospital and schools.
