= Reckless (surname) =

Reckless is a surname. Notable people with the surname include:

- Hetty Reckless (1776–1881), American runaway slave and abolitionist
- Mark Reckless (born 1970), British politician
- Walter Reckless (1899–1988), American criminologist
