= Reckless (Kenyan TV series) =

Kenyan TV series

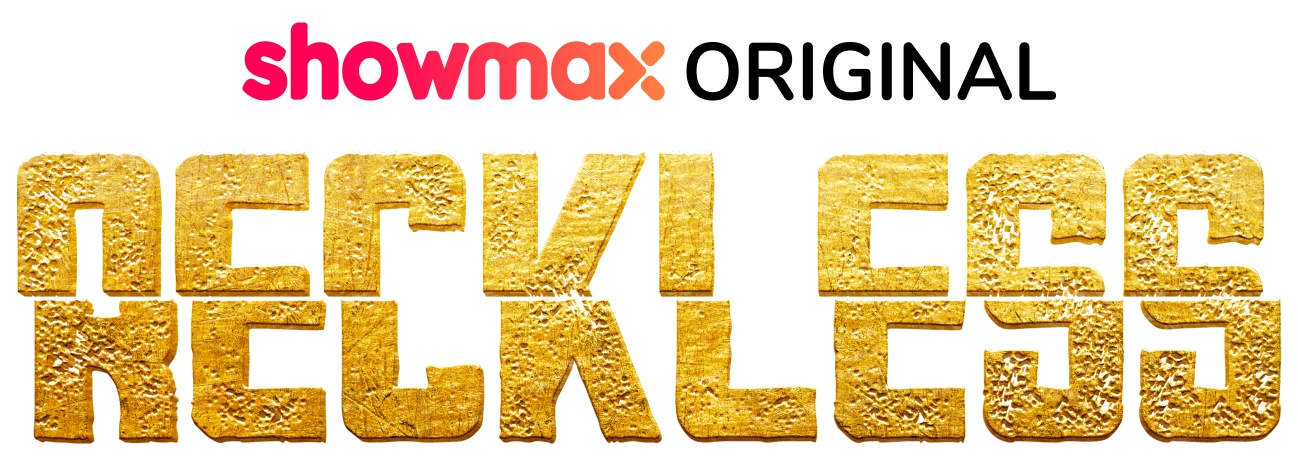
- Genre: Drama
- Based on: Concept by Vivek Bahl Story & Screenplay by Anantika & Sudeep Sahir
- Written by: Jim Malakwen
- Directed by: Carol Ochieng; Gilbert Lukalia; Isaya Evans
- Starring: Brian Abajah; Sammy Okore; Godfrey Odhiambo; Georgina Mbira; Ntinyari Mburukua; Ann Muli; Eddie Mbugua; Joyce Musoke; Wanjiru Marima
- Country of origin: Kenya
- Original languages: English; Swahili
- No. of seasons: 1
- No. of episodes: 80 (list of episodes)

Production
- Executive producer: Auka Gecheo
- Producers: King Muriuki & Eddah Kiruhi
- Cinematography: Geoffrey Mwangi
- Production company: Live Eye TV

Original release
- Network: Showmax
- Release: 23 June 2025 – present

Reckless is a 2025 Kenyan television drama series series that is streaming on Showmax.

The show premiered on 23 June 2025 and is produced by Auka Gecheo, King Muriuki and Eddah Kiruhi under Live Eye Limited. It stars an ensemble cast that includes Brian Abajah, Georgina Mbira, Godfrey Odhiambo among others.

== Plot ==
Reckless follows the Sonoko brothers, who find themselves at a crossroads following a tragic accident during an illegal street race. They are forced to flee the big city and must navigate the harsh realities of life in a remote village while trying protecting their family’s legacy.

== Cast ==
- Brian Abajah as Pete Sonoko, an entitled 23-year-old man shaped by wealth and privilege.
- Sammy Okore as Mika Sonoko, a fun-loving 18-year-old who enjoys partying but lacks the work ethic to excel at his goals. He has a tense relationship with his older brother, Pete.
- Godfrey Odhiambo as Edward Sonoko, a self-made patriarch of the Sonoko family.
- Georgina Mbira as Melinda Sonoko, a strict and distant mother whose tough love creates tension with her sons.
- Ntinyari Mburukua as Ella, a headstrong young woman from the remote village who instantly disapproves of the brothers, seeing them as selfish and spoilt.
- Ann Muli as Debbie, a young woman who competes for Pete’s attention and is a nemesis to Ella.
- Eddie Mbugua as James, a cunning antagonist who is willing to do anything to bring down the Sonoko family.
- Joyce Musoke as Agatha, James’ pragmatic wife, whose loyalty endures despite his scheming.
- Wanjiru Marima as Ziki, the younger sister to Ella.
- Joan Kendunywa

== Series overview ==
Season	Episodes	Originally released	
Season	Episodes	First released	Last released
1	TBC	June 23, 2025	Ongoing

=== Season 1 (2025) ===
No.	Title	Directed by	Original release date
1	"Fast Lane"	Various	23 June 2025
A reckless street race takes a deadly turn, forcing Mika Sonoko into a web of lies, cover-ups, and family power plays. As the truth unravels, the Sonoko empire faces collapse.
2	"Spare the rod"	Various	24 June 2025
As betrayal brews within the boardroom and legal trouble looms, secrets unravel, threatening to bring the family down from both the streets and the boardroom.
3	"Journey into night"	Various	30 June 2025
Mika and Pete are forced into exile. Stranded in unfamiliar territory with no resources, they must navigate a harsh new reality.
4	"Food for thought"	Various	1 July 2025
A corporate power struggle brews as their father, Edward, fights to protect his legacy from a cunning James.
5	"Episode 5"	Various	7 July 2025
Pete and Mika discover that the place they want to escape from may hold the key to their purpose. Their disappearance sparks a desperate search, forcing them to confront dangers.
6	"Episode 6"	Various	8 July 2025
While in the village, Pete and Mika navigate friendships, love, and family dynamics while secrets, ambitions, and past mistakes threaten to upend their lives.
7	"Episode 7"	Various	14 July 2025
Ella grapples with a painful past after a reluctant homecoming stirs old wounds. Rebellious Ziki sneaks off to a party that may hold more trouble than fun.
8	"Episode 8"	Various	15 July 2025
Pete and Mika struggle with harsh rules, rural life, and the unexpected discipline of living in the countryside. As they plot their escape, they discover that survival requires more than just rebellion.
9	"Episode 9"	Various	21 July 2025
Ella struggles with rowdy students, village drama, and personal struggles. Pete and Mika continue with their mischievous ways by trying to sell a stolen goat, leading to chaos in the local market.
10	"Episode 10"	Various	22 July 2025
In their bid to escape their past, Pete, Mika, Ella, and Ziki get themselves in danger and collide with the law. Their quest for freedom spirals into chaos, forcing them to confront their demons before it's too late.
11	"Episode 11"	Various	28 July 2025
A tragic accident spirals lives, forcing Ella, Ziki, Pete, and Mika learn to survive and keep secrets about a dark rural night. Powerful forces at a lavish party quietly shift allegiances, threatening to upend everything.
12	"Episode 12"	Various	29 July 2025
Tensions rise in the haunted depths of the forest as Pete, Mika, Ella, and Ziki face eerie symbols, vanishing goats, and ominous shrieks, testing their loyalty and sanity.
13	"Episode 13"	Various	4 August 2025
Lost in a haunted forest, Mika, Pete, Ziki and Ella battle illusions, fear, and mysterious forces while a desperate search party races to find them.
14	"Episode 14"	Various	5 August 2025
Buried secrets and simmering tensions rise to the surface as Pete, Mika, Ella, and Ziki struggle to survive a night in the forest. Despite the differences, they must cling to each other before everything falls apart.
15	"Episode 15"	Various	11 August 2025
Pete, Mika, Ella, and Ziki reunite with their grandmother. As they make their way back home, they have to confront the truths about family, friendship, and the deep-rooted beliefs of a village bound by ancient demons.
16	"Episode 16"	Various	12 August 2025
Pete and Mika embark on community-driven projects while navigating personal struggles, friendships, and ambitions, all in the heart of their vibrant town. Tensions rise at Sonoko Inc.
17	"Episode 17"	Various	18 August 2025
Two brothers, Mika and Pete, navigate unexpected life lessons, from fixing broken projectors to selling produce at a rural market.
18	"Episode 18"	Various	19 August 2025
Keera village offers tough lessons for Pete and Mika Sonoko, two brothers accustomed to a life of glitz and glamour.
19	"Episode 19"	Various	25 August 2025
A confident yet mischievous Mika struggles to fit in at Keera Institute, where romance, rivalry, and lessons challenge his ego. Meanwhile, Pete, another outsider, clashes with the fiery Ella.
20	"Episode 20"	Various	26 August 2025
A fire breaks out at Keera Technical Training Institute, igniting chaos and suspicion among students and teachers. As secrets, betrayals, and hidden agendas unfold, Ella must prove her innocence
21	"Episode 21"	Various	1 September 2025
A desperate Ziki seeks supernatural help to win back her love, unaware of the chaos she's about to unleash. Meanwhile, Mika faces a harsh reality check as his privileged life crumbles.
22	"Episode 22"	Various	2 September 2025
A confident but clueless Mika believes he can win over the taken Ana, but his plans unravel in the most humiliating way possible. Meanwhile, corporate power struggles threaten to bring down the Sonoko empire.
23	"Episode 23"	Various	8 September 2025
A mysterious potion leaves Ziki voiceless and alters Mika's identity, sparking a desperate search for a cure. Meanwhile, the Sonoko legacy faces dismantlement due to power struggles and hidden agendas.
24	"Episode 24"	Various	9 September 2025
A desperate Ziki struggles to reach Ella, who has locked herself away in distress. Meanwhile, Pete and Mika, unaware of the storm brewing at home, stumble upon a shocking revelation about their family.
25	"Episode 25"	Various	15 September 2025
The Sonoko family attempts to control the narrative surrounding the mysterious disappearance of Mika and Pete, while a cunning James manipulates events from the shadows. A heartbroken Ella struggles.
26	"Episode 26"	Various	16 September 2025
Pete struggles to mend broken relationships while facing rejection from Ella. Mika is drawn into a dangerous game with Tony's gang.
27	"Episode 27"	Various	22 September 2025
Mika, eager to fit in, falls victim to a cruel prank, leaving him humiliated and exposed at school. At the same time, Pete's attempt to make amends with Ella backfires as their tensions reach a boiling point.
28	"Episode 28"	Various	23 September 2025
Malik infiltrates the powerful Sonoko estate to uncover dark secrets. Tensions rise between Pete and Ella as they navigate love, betrayal, and survival in a world that seems determined to break them.
29	"Episode 29"	Various	29 September 2025
At the Keera Institute, rivalry ignites between Pete and Tony, while a secret love note sparks emotional turmoil that unravels hidden feelings and favouritism.
30	"Episode 30"	Various	30 September 2025
Ella fights to save Keera Technical Institute from financial ruin while dealing with sabotage from within. A crucial presentation to investors becomes a high-stakes battle for the school's survival.
31	"Episode 31"	Various	6 October 2025
Ella fights to salvage the institute's reputation after an act of sabotage while a tangled web of secrets and betrayals threatens to unravel around her.
32	"Episode 32"	Various	7 October 2025
When Keera Institute is offered a lifeline through a community football match, Ella, Pete and Mika must rally an uninterested student body and confront Tony to save their school.
33	"Episode 33"	Various	13 October 2025
Pete and Mika must navigate rivalries and betrayals on and off the field as their football dreams clash. Meanwhile, corporate scheming at Sonoko Inc threatens to entangle them in a sinister web of deceit.
34	"Episode 34"	Various	14 October 2025
When an underfunded Keera Institute faces disqualification from a tournament, a ragtag team of misfits band together to form a football team.
35	"Episode 35"	Various	20 October 2025
When a mysterious note sparks a chain of secrets, teenage love, and unresolved grief, the Mwanzis must overcome personal struggles and revive a struggling football team.
36	"Episode 36"	Various	21 October 2025
A web of secret admirers, old flames, and budding romances unfold at Keera Institute, where Mika unknowingly holds the key to someone's heart. Pete and Ella navigate village life.
37	"Episode 37"	Various	27 October 2025
A group of young footballers in Keera strive to prove their worth in a high-stakes match, navigating friendships, rivalries, and personal challenges. Meanwhile, a darker plot unfolds.
38	"Episode 38"	Various	28 October 2025
Pete is accused of theft, but his true intentions become clear when he returns with gifts, challenging the community's trust issues.
39	"Episode 39"	Various	3 November 2025
Pete and Mika deceive and rob a village while pretending to help them. A desperate chase follows, culminating in a final showdown that will determine who wields power.
40	"Episode 40"	Various	4 November 2025
Ella grapples with betrayal as her village turns against her. Pete and Mika flee their past, seeking refuge in a world that may not welcome them back.
41	"Episode 41"	Various	10 November 2025
Pete and Mika, on the run after a daring escape, return home. Meanwhile, Ella and her fractured team fight to reclaim their honour, unaware that their past and future are about to collide.
42	"Episode 42"	Various	11 November 2025
A desperate Mika and parched Pete struggle for survival in a deserted land, unaware of their past misdeeds. Secrets unravel within the Sonoko and Amani families.
43	"Episode 43"	Various	17 November 2025
Pete and Mika return to Keera seeking redemption after betraying the community, only to face rejection, danger, and an unexpected chance at forgiveness.
44	"Episode 44"	Various	18 November 2025
Pete and Mika struggle to find their place at a tough training institute, facing bullies, broken friendships, and their own past mistakes. An unexpected act of kindness forces them to confront what truly matters.
45	"Episode 45"	Various	24 November 2025
Ella struggles to overcome past trauma and societal judgment while finding solace in Mary and Ziki's support. Pete and Mika seek redemption and stability in a tough new environment.
46	"Episode 46"	Various	25 November 2025
Mika and Pete struggle to survive and rebuild their tarnished reputations after losing everything, navigating love, betrayal, and redemption in Keera.
47	"Episode 47"	Various	1 December 2025
Mika believes he has found his dream girl, only to be caught in a web of deception. Meanwhile, an injured Pete fights for survival as the people who betrayed him wrestle with their guilt.
48	"Episode 48"	Various	2 December 2025
A desperate Mika searches tirelessly for his missing brother, Pete, whose life hangs by a thread in a remote hospital. Mary faces the dilemma of whether to care for Pete or send him back to the city.
49	"Episode 49"	Various	8 December 2025
A desperate Mika pleads for forgiveness, hoping to regain Mary's trust, but her conditions may be more than he bargained for. Meanwhile, James' affair unravels as his wife, Agatha, discovers his betrayal.
50	"Episode 50"	Various	9 December 2025
Pete is battered and bruised, struggling to recall his attackers. Mika is torn between caring for him and his mysterious new love interest, Lucy. Agatha confronts James over his betrayal.
51	"Episode 51"	Various	15 December 2025
Ziki crashes Mika and Lucy's date to expose Lucy's secrets, but Lucy manipulates the situation, making Ziki look like the jealous villain. Pete struggles with guilt and hallucinations as a mysterious figure lurks.
52	"Episode 52"	Various	16 December 2025
Pete struggles to save an unconscious Ella while battling his own injuries, as Ziki and her friends embark on a plan to uncover "Cindy's" true intentions. Mika finds himself tangled in Lucy's web of secrets.
53	"Episode 53"	Various	22 December 2025
When a near-death incident brings Pete and Ella closer, hidden emotions surface but danger lurks in the shadows.
54	"Episode 54"	Various	23 December 2025
Nala has a chilling premonition of chaos brewing in Keera Village, while Pete struggles to redeem himself in Ella's eyes after risking his life to save her.
55	"Episode 55"	Various	29 December 2025
Pete sets out to redeem his village's pride by forming a football team, while his mischievous brother Mika keeps him on his toes.
56	"Episode 56"	Various	30 December 2025
As Bono, tormented by accusations and despair, threatens to end his life in the street, Pete tries to talk him down. Meanwhile, Agatha seethes with suspicion and jealousy.
57	"Episode 57"	Various	5 January 2026
James grapples with Agatha's reckless outburst, threatening their lavish lifestyle, while in the small village of Keera, Pete and Mika receive an unexpected second chance at redemption.
58	"Episode 58"	Various	6 January 2026
A group of students navigate friendships, rivalries, and hidden motives as they prepare for a football match that could restore their village's pride.
59	"Episode 59"	Various	12 January 2026
James and Agatha devise strategies to outsmart Melinda, but their plans take an unexpected turn when she suddenly disappears. Ella's past resurfaces as Owen returns, shaking her to the core.
60	"Episode 60"	Various	13 January 2026
Ella is struggling to heal from an old heartbreak while Pete is trying to prove his worth. Mika begins a journey to reconnect with his lover, Cindy. Tension continues to rise at the Sonoko Office.
61	"Episode 61"	Various	19 January 2026
As suspicions swirl around the charming but mysterious Lucy, Ziki's instincts clash with Mika's blind affection, while tension simmers in Keera between past lovers, family secrets, and rising doubts.
62	"Episode 62"	Various	20 January 2026
As tensions continue to build under one roof, love, betrayal, and unresolved feelings push Pete, Mika, Ella, and Ziki to emotional breaking points.
63	"Episode 63"	Various	26 January 2026
As love quietly brews between Ella and Pete amidst unspoken emotions and misunderstood intentions, tangled secrets and hidden agendas begin to unravel around them.
64	"Episode 64"	Various	27 January 2026
As Pete confesses his love through a passionate proposal, Ella rejects him. Meanwhile, a tangled web of lies unravels in Lucy's room when her two lovers unexpectedly collide.
65	"Episode 65"	Various	2 February 2026
A heartbroken Pete drowns his sorrows in alcohol after rejection, while his friends struggle to find him and restore his spirit in time for an important football tournament.
66	"Episode 66"	Various	3 February 2026
As a struggling Keera Institute team faces challenges on and off the field, and when unexpected allies and old enemies clash, they're forced to make tough choices for victory.
67	"Episode 67"	Various	9 February 2026
When Pete and Mika attempt a heartfelt gesture, it sets off a chain of emotional entanglements, unresolved rivalries, and a shocking act of violence that threatens their unity.
68	"Episode 68"	Various	10 February 2026
In the quiet rural town of Keera, love, lies, and betrayal collide as James juggles multiple lives, Ella questions her heart, and tensions mount before a high-stakes football match.
69	"Episode 69"	Various	16 February 2026
When a soccer match becomes a battleground of leadership, strategy, and redemption, Pete and Mika must apply logic, teamwork, and mental resilience to defy the odds.
70	"Episode 70"	Various	17 February 2026
In the heart of Keera, love blossoms in secret between Ella and Pete, but old flames, watchful eyes, and dangerous secrets threaten to unravel everything.
71	"Episode 71"	Various	23 February 2026
When Mika mysteriously disappears, a tangled web of lies, betrayal, and hidden truths unravels in Keera village, forcing his loved ones into a desperate search.
72	"Episode 72"	Various	24 February 2026
When Ziki is found unconscious on a deserted road, Keera village is thrown into chaos, unraveling dangerous secrets, betrayal, and a powerful family's desperate cover-up.
73	"Episode 73"	Various	2 March 2026
Pete and Mika fake a disappearance to expose their wealthy, neglectful parents, only to uncover deeper family secrets and unexpected betrayals in a small village that gave them more love than home.
74	"Episode 74"	Various	3 March 2026
Love, guilt, and betrayal collide when Pete and Mika uncover the painful truth behind their forced exile. With trust shattered and relationships tested, the line between right and wrong is blurred.
75	"Episode 75"	Various	9 March 2026
Ella is shattered when she learns that Pete has left town, only to be thrown into emotional turmoil when fate brings them back together for one final night.
76	"Episode 76"	Various	10 March 2026
When Edward and Melinda awaken from a nightmare, they're forced to confront their parenting failures.
77	"Episode 77"	Various	16 March 2026
When Melinda has to live like a villager for ten days, Pete and Mika teach her a humbling lesson about love, sacrifice, and real success.
78	"Episode 78"	Various	17 March 2026
Ella is assaulted and accused of theft by Melinda, forcing Pete to take a public stand for the truth and the woman he loves. Mika and Ziki hatch a bold plan.
79	"Episode 79"	Various	23 March 2026
In Keera, Pete and Mika face a media storm that threatens to expose a family secret. The Sonokos and Mwanzis are forced to confront what really matters.
80	"Episode 80"	Various	24 March 2026
Pete and Ella's tender moment is interrupted by a drunken Obed. Meanwhile, Melinda's obsessive jealousy toward Ella intensifies, culminating in a dramatic confrontation.

== Production ==
=== Development ===
Reckless was announced in early June 2025 ahead of its premiere later in the month. The show is produced by Live Eye Limited, the creators of other Showmax originals Second Family and Faithless. Auka Gecheo serves as the executive producer and Eddah Kiruhi is the creative producer.

In an exclusive interview with MPASHO, opened up about the high stakes car chase that appeared in the premiere episode. The car chase was shot along the Southern Bypass.

== Release ==
Showmax released the first episode on 23 June, and subsequent episodes being available on the streaming platform every Monday and Tuesday.
