= The Real Housewives of Nairobi =

Kenyan reality television series

- Genre: Reality television
- Based on: The Real Housewives
- Directed by: Oprah Oyugi; Carla Wanyika
- Starring: Lisa Christoffersen; Susan Kaittany; Minne Kariuki; Sonal Maherali; Dr. Catherine Masitsa; Vera Sidika; Farah Esmail; Reja Keji Ladu; Zena Nyambu
- Country of origin: Kenya
- No. of seasons: 2
- No. of episodes: 28

Production
- Producer: Eugene Mbugua
- Production location: Nairobi
- Cinematography: Ahmed Deen; Wambui Muigai; Geoffrey Mwangi
- Production companies: D&R Studios

Original release
- Network: Showmax
- Release: 23 February 2023 – present

The Real Housewives of Nairobi, aka RHONairobi, is a Kenyan reality television series airing on Showmax. The show is a production of Eugene Mbugua's D&R Studios. Developed as an international installment of the Real Housewives franchise, it documents the personal and professional lives of several women residing in Kenya.

The first episode of season one RHONairobi is broke the record for the most-watched premiere ever for any title on Showmax in Kenya.

== Episodes ==
Series	Episodes	Originally released	
Series	Episodes	First released	Last released
1	14	23 February 2023	8 June 2023
2	14	10 May 2024	23 August 2024

== Cast ==
=== Timeline of cast members ===
Main cast members
Cast member	Seasons	
Cast member	1	2
Lisa Christoffersen	Main	Guest
Susan Kaittany	Main	
Dr. Catherine Masitsa	Main	Main
Sonal Maherali	Main	Guest
Vera Sidika	Main	Main
Minne Kariuki	Main	Main
Farah Esmail	Guest	Main
Rejah Keji Ladu		Main
Zena Nyambu		Main
