= Showmax =

Defunct video on demand and streaming service

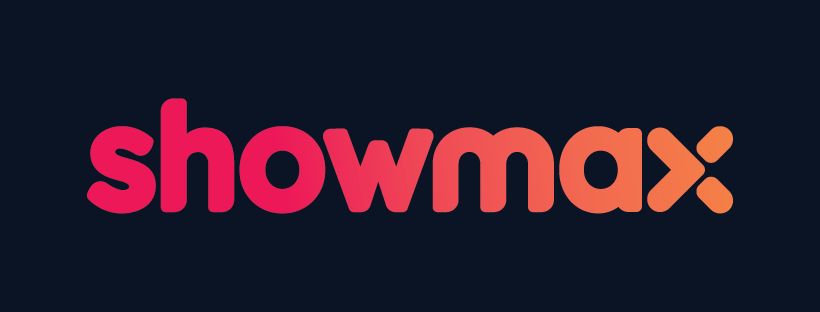
- Website type: OTT platform
- Available in: English
- Founded: 19 August 2015; 11 years ago
- Headquarters: Johannesburg, South Africa
- Area served: Sub-Saharan Africa (Note: excluding Burundi, Liberia, Somalia, South Sudan, Sudan, the French overseas regions of Mayotte, Réunion and the British overseas territory of Saint Helena)
- Industry: Entertainment
- Parent: MultiChoice (Canal+ S.A.) (70%); NBCUniversal (30%)
- Website: showmax.com
- Registration: Required
- Users: 3.1 million (2024)
- Launched: 19 August 2015; 11 years ago (original); 12 February 2024; 2 years ago (relaunch)
- Current status: Defunct (since 2026)

Showmax was a South African subscription video on-demand over-the-top streaming television service that launched in 2015.

Its majority owner (with a shareholding of 70%) was South African satellite TV company MultiChoice. American conglomerate NBCUniversal owned 30% in all territories except Nigeria, where NBCUniversal held an indirect 23.7% stake in the local subsidiary. In 2023, Showmax announced a partnership with NBCUniversal and Sky. The new Showmax launched in February 2024, with a brand-new app and streaming platform, as well as an unprecedented content slate.

Showmax uses a localisation strategy to take on established video on demand competitors with a focus on local content and partnerships with mobile telcos. It has a customer base of 2.1 million subscribers Africa-wide first place in the continent's market overtaking Netflix's 1.8 million by November 2023. The Showmax catalogue consists of series, movies and documentaries from Hollywood, Kenya, Nigeria, Ghana, South Africa and the UK, among others, and content in English, Afrikaans, isiZulu, Kiswahili, Sepedi, Setswana, Sesotho and isiXhosa, and other African languages. Showmax's engineering team was originally based in the Czech Republic, but has since merged with Sky UK's Global Streaming team.

In March 2026, it was announced that Showmax would be shut down on 30 April and will be replaced by DStv Stream and in the near future, the Canal+ streaming service.

== History ==
In December 2015, Showmax expanded its reach to audiences in Europe, Oceania and North America, with lineups tailored for African expats. In May 2016, Showmax expanded to 36 countries in Africa, taking the total number of countries in which Showmax is available to 65. In July of the same year, Showmax passed the 10 million views milestone. In August 2016, the Showmax logo was changed from framed black and white logotype using camel case to an all lower-case logotype with added dark magenta and teal stripes. In October of the same year, Showmax launched Showmax Select and Showmax Premium in Kenya. In January 2017, Showmax partnered with SEACOM to put caching servers in Nairobi, Kenya. A month later, Showmax launched in Poland. In December 2017, Saturday Night Live Polska launched as their original series.

On 31 January 2019, Showmax was closed in Poland due to slow growth. On 7 July 2020, Showmax Pro was launched. The new service bundled the existing Showmax entertainment service with music channels, news, and live sport streaming from SuperSport.

In March 2023, MultiChoice and Comcast's NBCUniversal and Sky announced that they would partner with Showmax in Africa, with NBCU owning 30% of the new entity and MultiChoice owning 70%. The joint venture now harnesses Peacock technology and includes content from Peacock and Sky, as well as African content, such as Showmax Originals and local content from MultiChoice's proprietary channels, including Mzansi Magic, Africa Magic and Maisha Magic at re-launch.

On 15 November 2023, Showmax announced plans for a relaunch with a brand-new app in February 2024, after the announcement of the partnership between Showmax and international media heavyweight Comcast's NBCUniversal and Sky in March. With the relaunch, Showmax introduced a new sports plan called Showmax Premier League, giving subscribers live-stream access to all Premier League games, courtesy of SuperSport, on mobile devices.

Other plans on offer post-launch include Showmax Entertainment, available on up to five devices with two concurrent streams, providing unlimited access to all the local and international series, movies, documentaries and kids' shows in the Showmax catalogue; and Showmax Entertainment Mobile, which includes access to the same entertainment catalogue, but only on one mobile device, with one stream.

With the announcement of the relaunch, Showmax also unveiled a brand-new logo, and explained how migration onto the global, robust Peacock streaming platform allows the service to scale fast. The content slate that hit Showmax after the launch in February 2024 includes a number of African Originals, as well as a line-up of series and movies.

HBO & Warner Bros content left the service in January 2026 after MultiChoice failed to reach an agreement with Warner Bros. Discovery over the extension of its content slate on the platform.

=== Closure ===
On 5 March 2026, MultiChoice's new owners Canal+ announced that Showmax would be discontinued after a comprehensive review of the former's streaming business. Showmax lost $522 million dollars in the 3 previous years with revenue declining from $61.6 million to $45.2 million.

The shutdown is expected to raise cost savings from €150 million (approx. $177.41) million 2025 to €250 million (approx. $282.17) million in 2026. MultiChoice has started to rebrand Showmax Originals as content for its television channels. Six days later, it was announced that it will be replaced by the Canal+ app in the near future. For the meantime, Showmax content has since been moved to DStv Stream, starting from the Compact package and upwards.

At the time of the closure announcement, Showmax had achieved significant annual subscriber growth, gained 27% of the South African streaming service market share, and gained 17% of the African streaming service market share, overtaking Netflix in terms of subscriber count. Despite this, due to reported poor management, the service had made multiple annual losses.

== Features ==
=== Downloads ===
Showmax's download feature allows users to download up to 25 shows or movies at a time and watch them offline on Android and iOS tablets and smartphones. There are four different quality settings to reduce the amount of data required to download.

=== Bandwidth capping ===
In January 2024, Showmax released their new bandwidth caps, which include a low cap that uses only 60 MB per hour on mobile, with three other bandwidth caps that use up to 240 MB/hour, 330 MB/hour and 1.6 GB/hour respectively on mobile, allowing subscribers to manage their data usage while streaming.

=== Multiple profiles ===
In August 2016, Showmax added a multiple profile feature including the ability to set up child-friendly profiles with three age settings.

=== Mobile plan ===
In October 2019, Showmax introduced a mobile-only plan. According to Showmax, "Smartphones and tablets are, for many in Africa, the primary, if not only, window to the internet, and up until now none of the most popular SVoD services has designed a product specifically for mobile usage."

=== Showmax Pro ===
In July 2020, Showmax launched live sport streaming service Showmax Pro and began roll out across 40 countries in Africa. In June 2019, Showmax began testing sport live-streaming, and by 2022, the Showmax Pro service was available across 50 African countries in sub-Saharan Africa.

On 1 October 2023, Showmax announced that Showmax Pro would no longer be available for subscription ahead of the relaunch of Showmax. By 30 November 2023, Showmax Pro was phased out to make way for Showmax's new sports-streaming product, Showmax Premier League, which gives subscribers access to all 380 games of the Premier League, all available to live stream on their mobile devices.

== Showmax Originals ==
Showmax Originals include:

- Tali's Wedding Diary
- The Girl from St. Agnes
- Trippin with Skhumba
- Somizi & Mohale: The Union
- Rage
- The Real Housewives of Durban
- Crime and Justice
- Dam
- Devilsdorp
- Blood Psalms
- Diiche
- Flawsome
- This Body Works For Me
- Wura
- The Real Housewives of Nairobi
- Adulting
- Faithless
- Boetie Boer: Inside The Mind Of A Killer
- The Real Housewives of Lagos
- Bae Beyond Borders
- Cheta M
- Sadau Sisters
- Red Ink
- Youngins
- Wyfie
- Catch Me a Killer
- Widows Unveiled
- 4Play
- Subterranea
- Big Girl Small World
- The Hot Seat
- Single Kiasi
- The Chocolate Empire
- The Mommy Club NBO
- Reckless
- Adam to Eve
- Mizani
- Tracking Thabo Bester
