= Culture of Kenya =

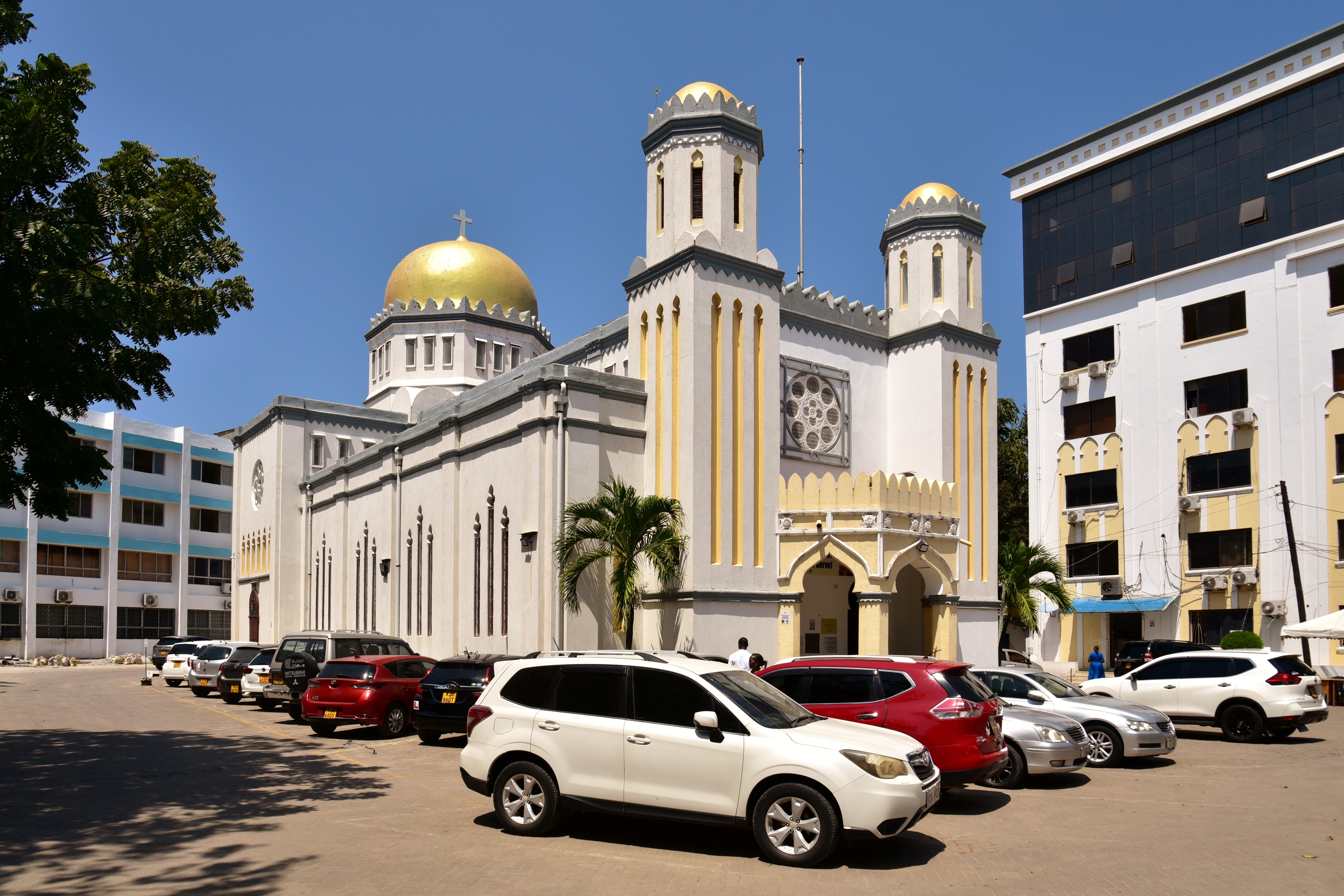
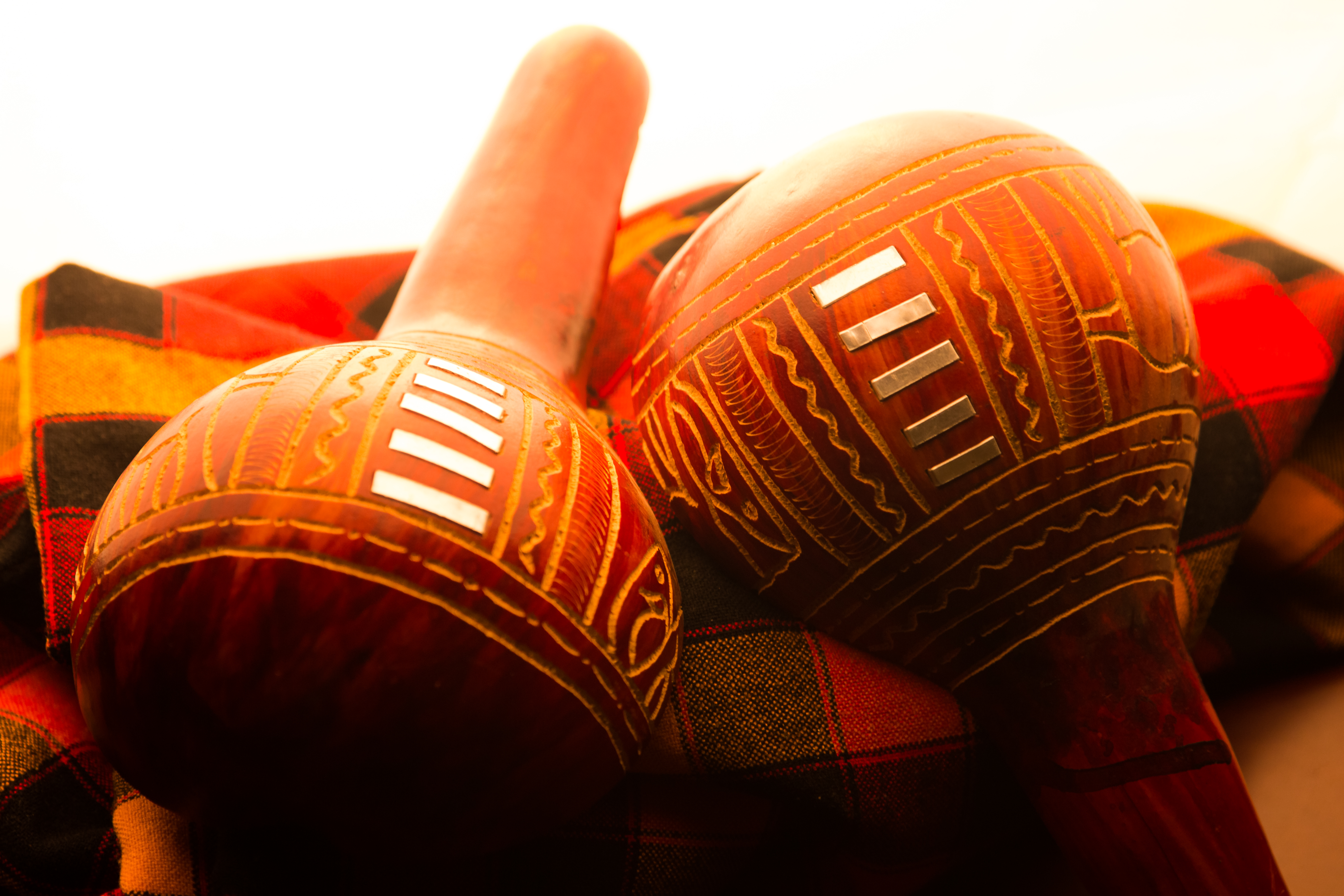
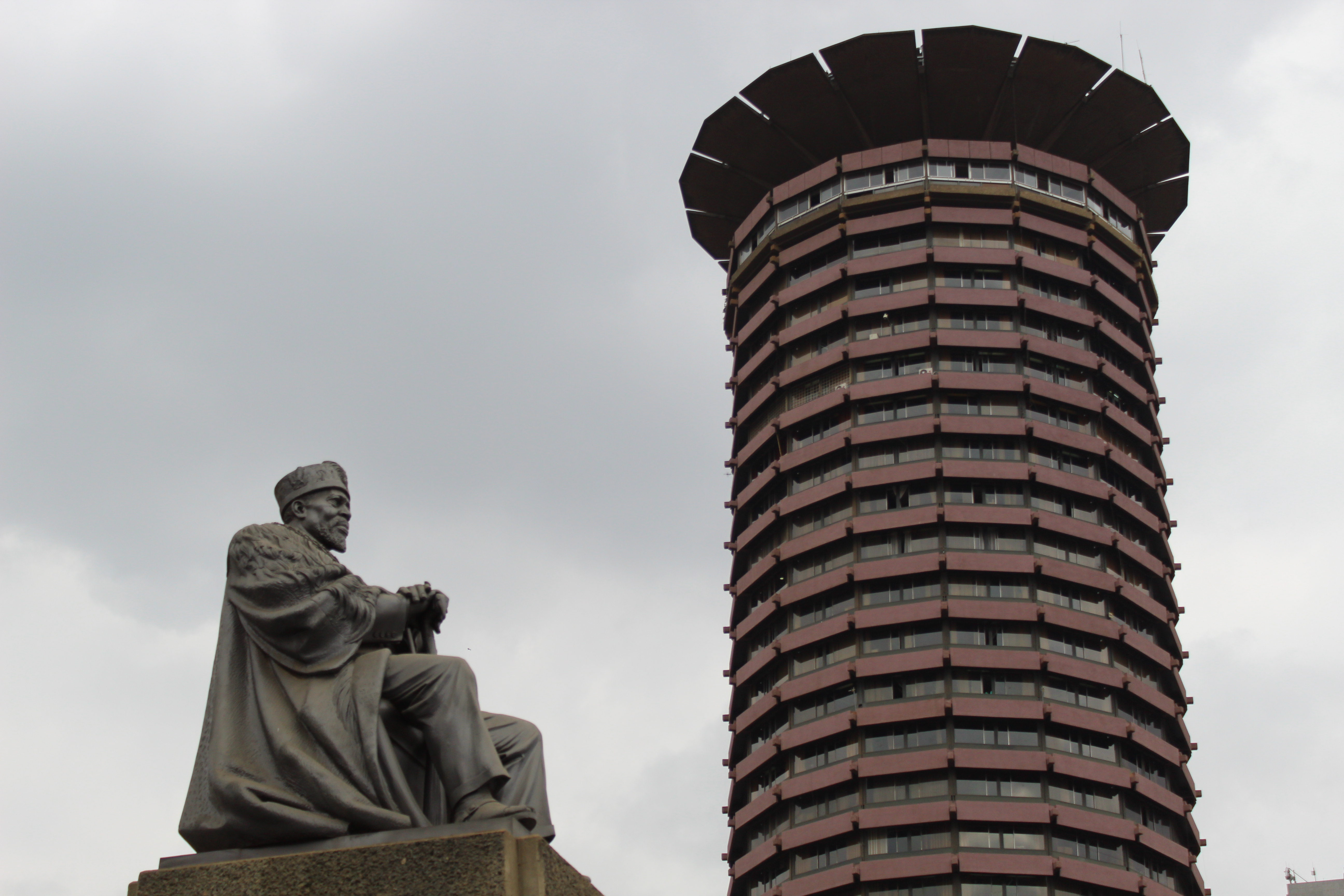
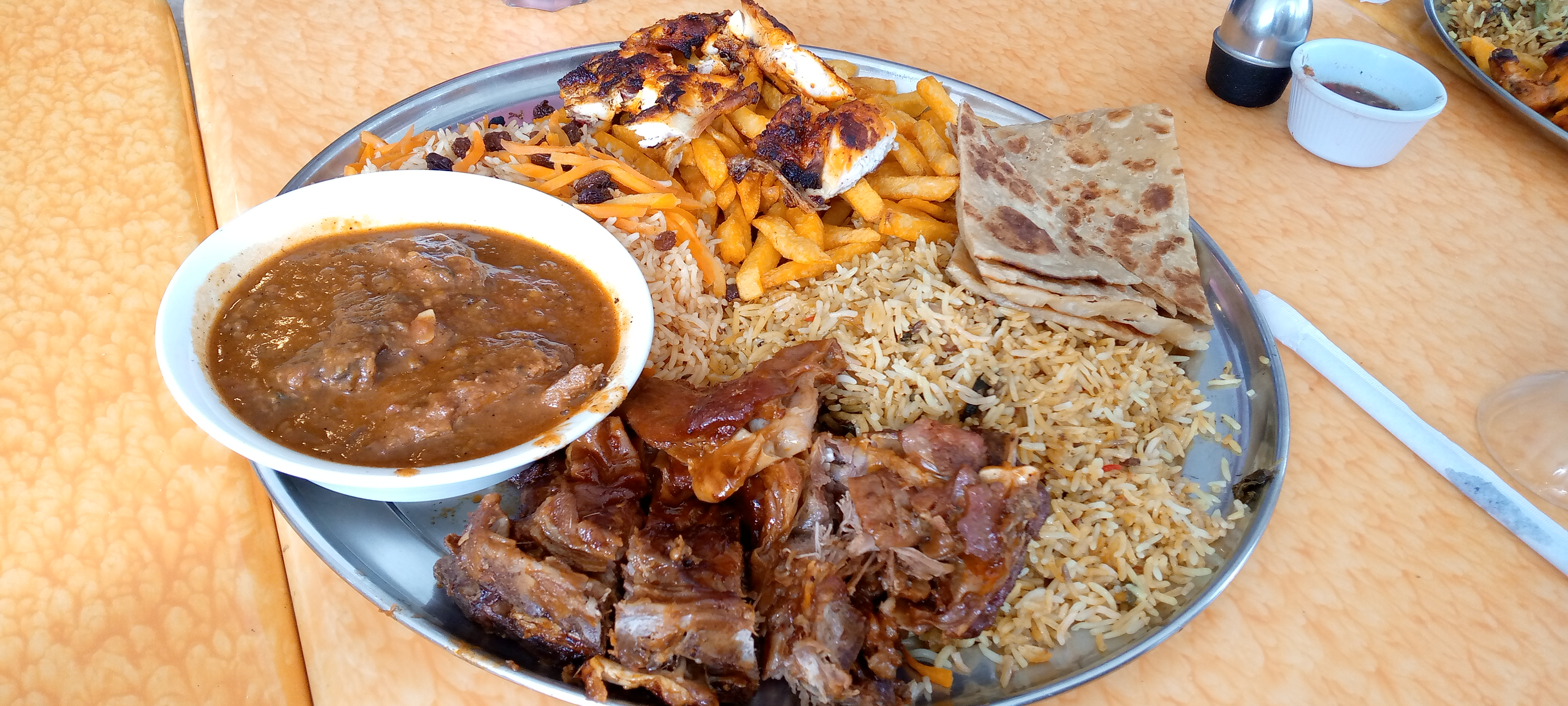
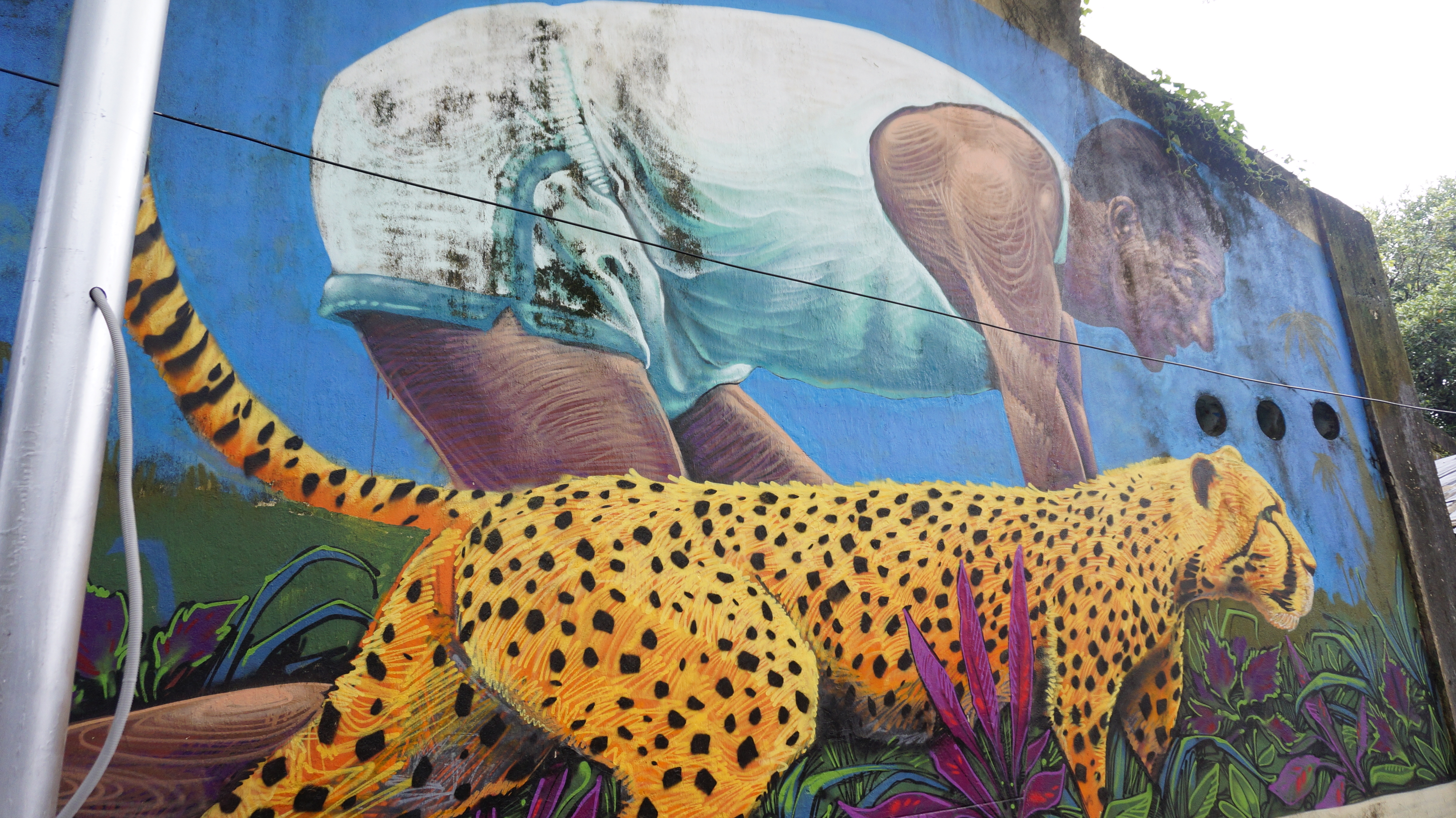
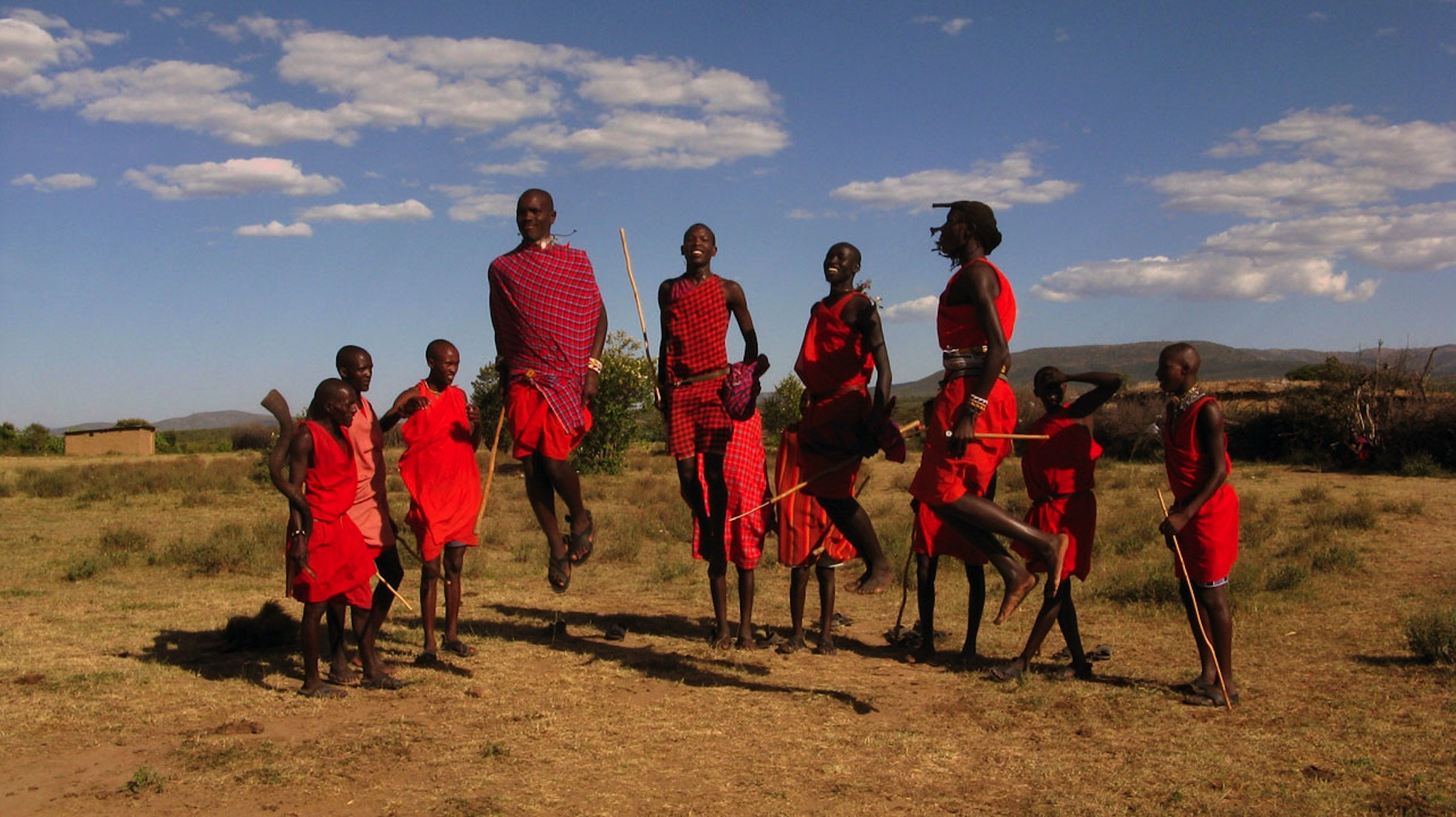
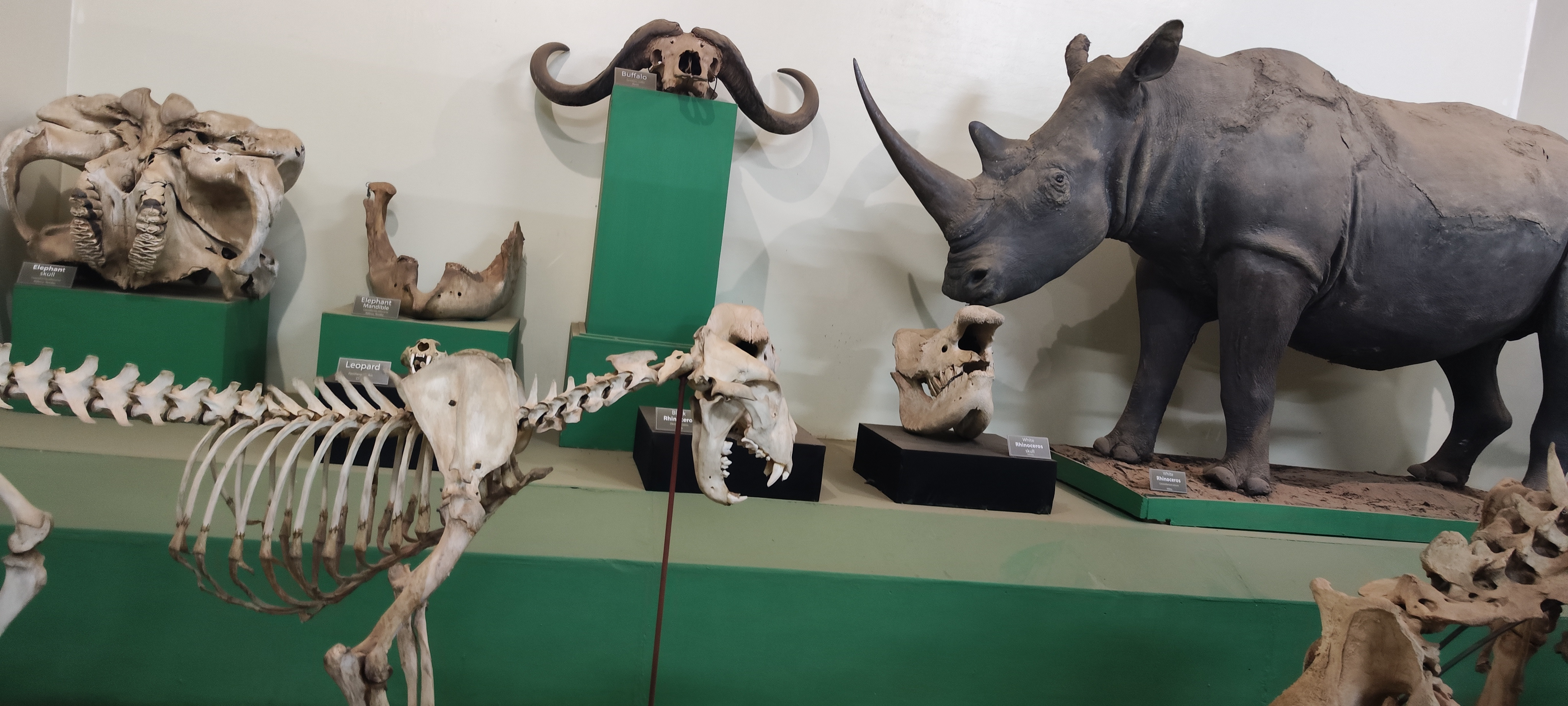
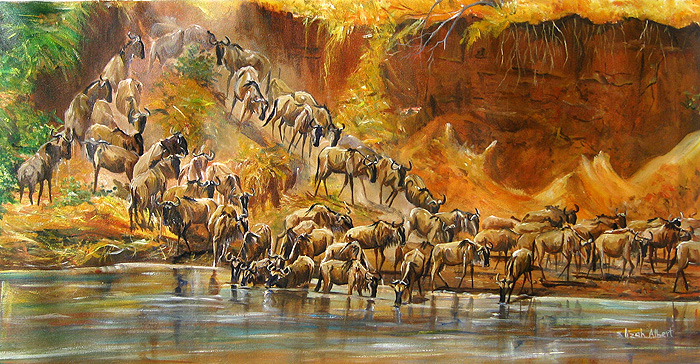
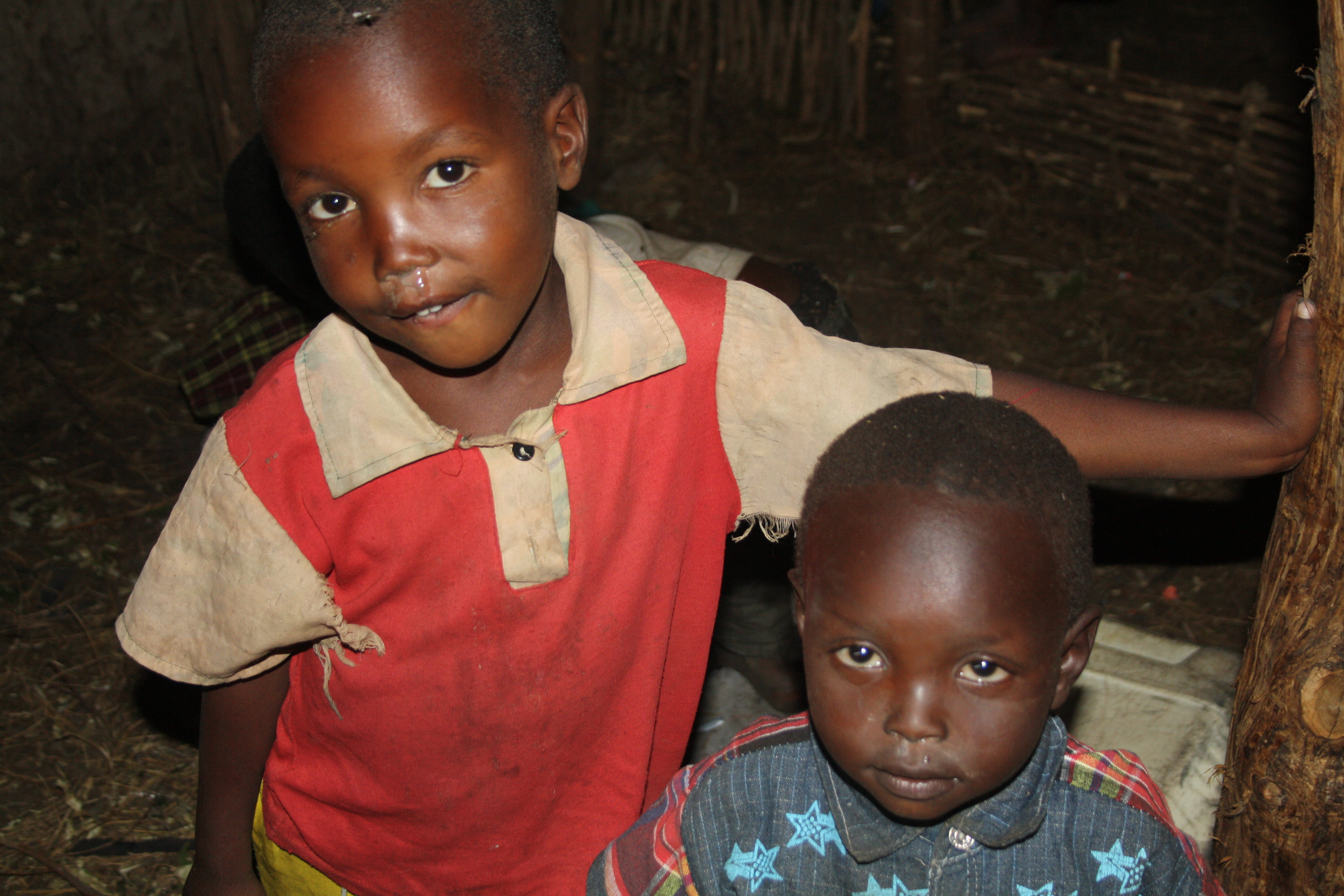

The culture of Kenya consists of multiple traditions and trends without a single prominent culture identifying the country. Kenyan cultural heritage and modern expressions of culture instead consist of various cultures, shaped and practiced by the country's different communities.

However, a different scholarly opinion from Prof. Olubayi Olubayi of Kenya states that "a distinct national culture of Kenya has emerged and continues to grow stronger as it simultaneously borrows from, reorganizes, and lends to, the 50 ancient ethnic cultures of Kenya. The emerging national culture of Kenya has several strong dimensions that include the rise of a national language, the full acceptance of Kenyan as an identity, the success of a postcolonial constitutional order, the transition from ecumenical religions, the urban dominance of multiethnic cultural productions, and increased national cohesion".

== History ==
Kenyan culture has evolved over time, in the course of Bantu and Nilotic immigrations, conduction of trade by the Swahili people and independence for struggles against British rule.

== Specifics ==
The largest subsaharan ethnic groups are the Bantu, especially the Kikuyu, and the Nilotic peoples, especially the Kalenjin, each with unique cultural traits. The other native subsaharan Africans, the Cushites, may geopolitically self-identify as East African, but culture-wise increasingly also consider themselves as Horners. In addition, the small minority of Kenyans with Eurasian heritage mainly hail from northwestern parts of India, Oman and the British aristocracy.

== Cuisine ==
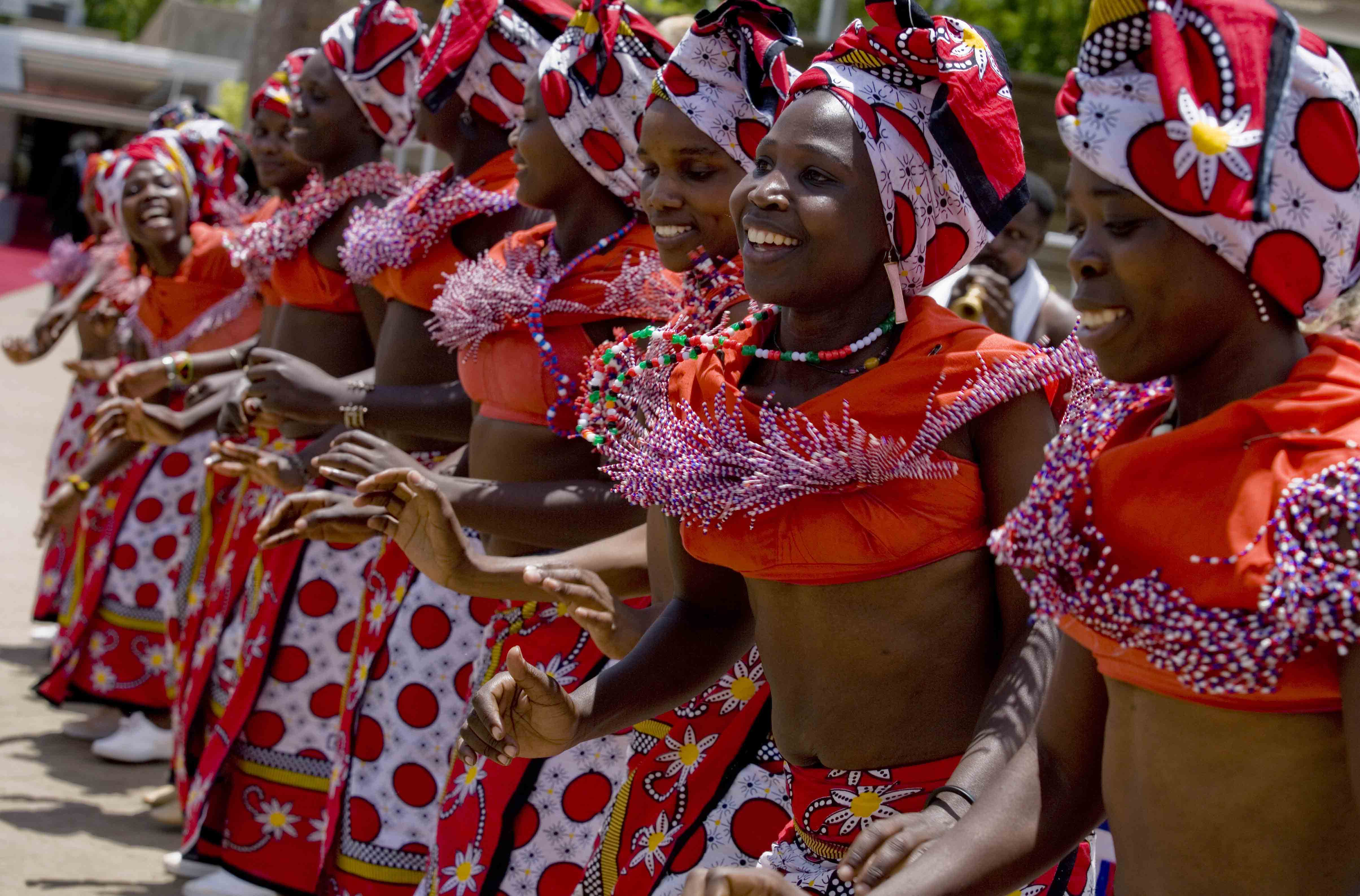
Traditional dancers in Nairobi

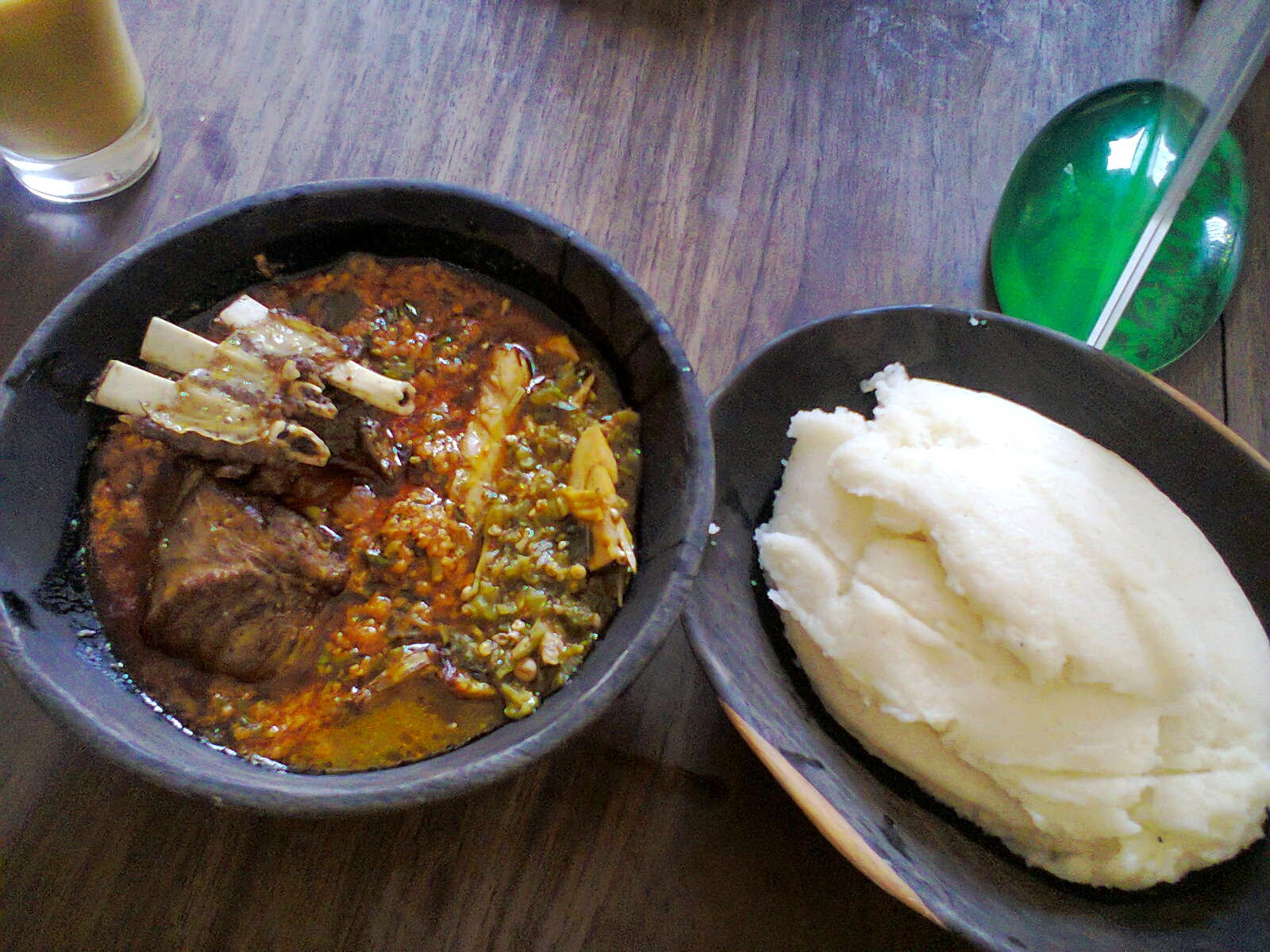
Ugali, served here with beef and sauce, is a mainstay of the cuisine throughout the African Great Lakes region.

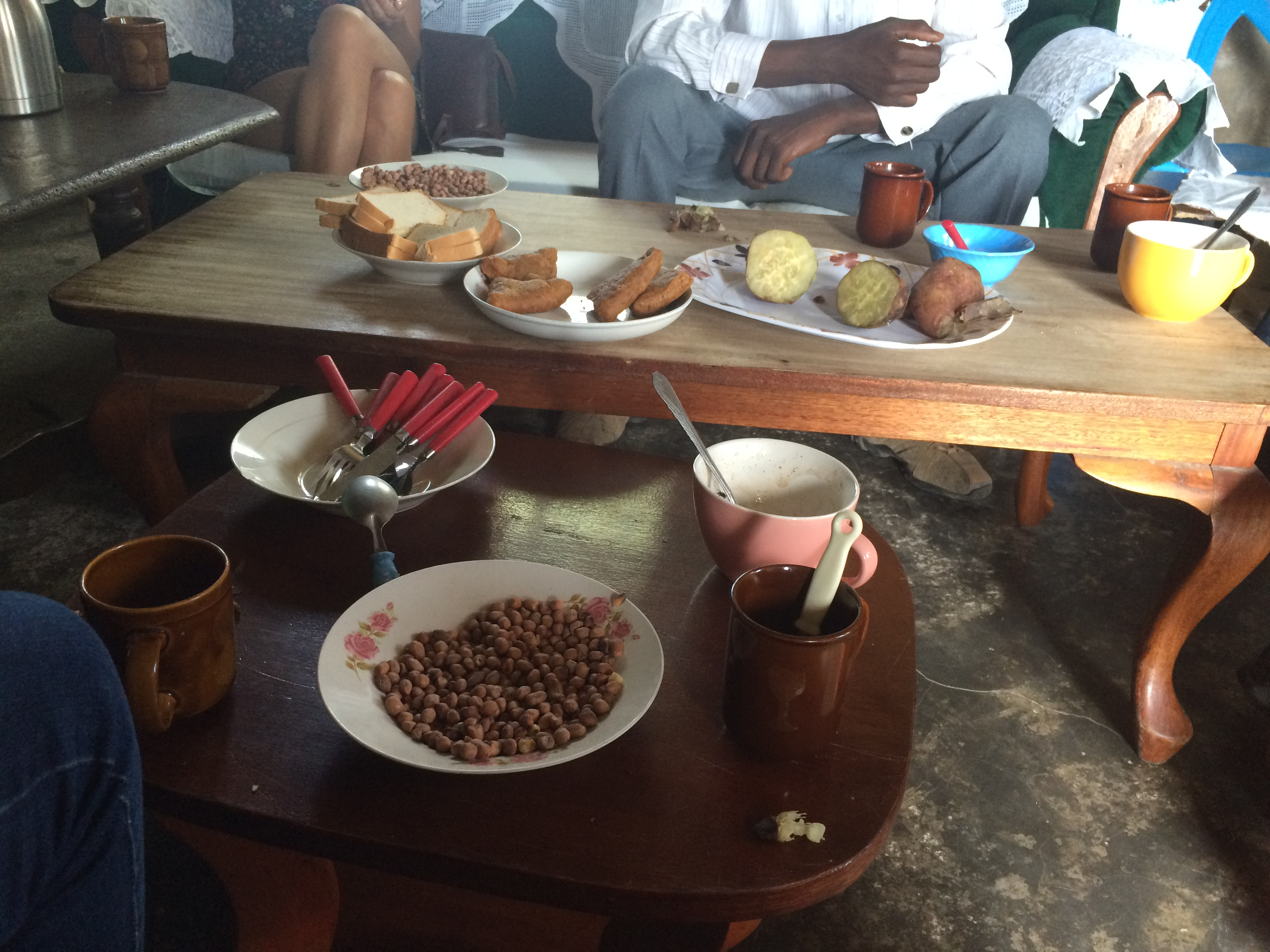
Mahamri/mandazi (Swahili doughnuts) served with roasted groundnuts (peanuts), tubers, white bread, and chai

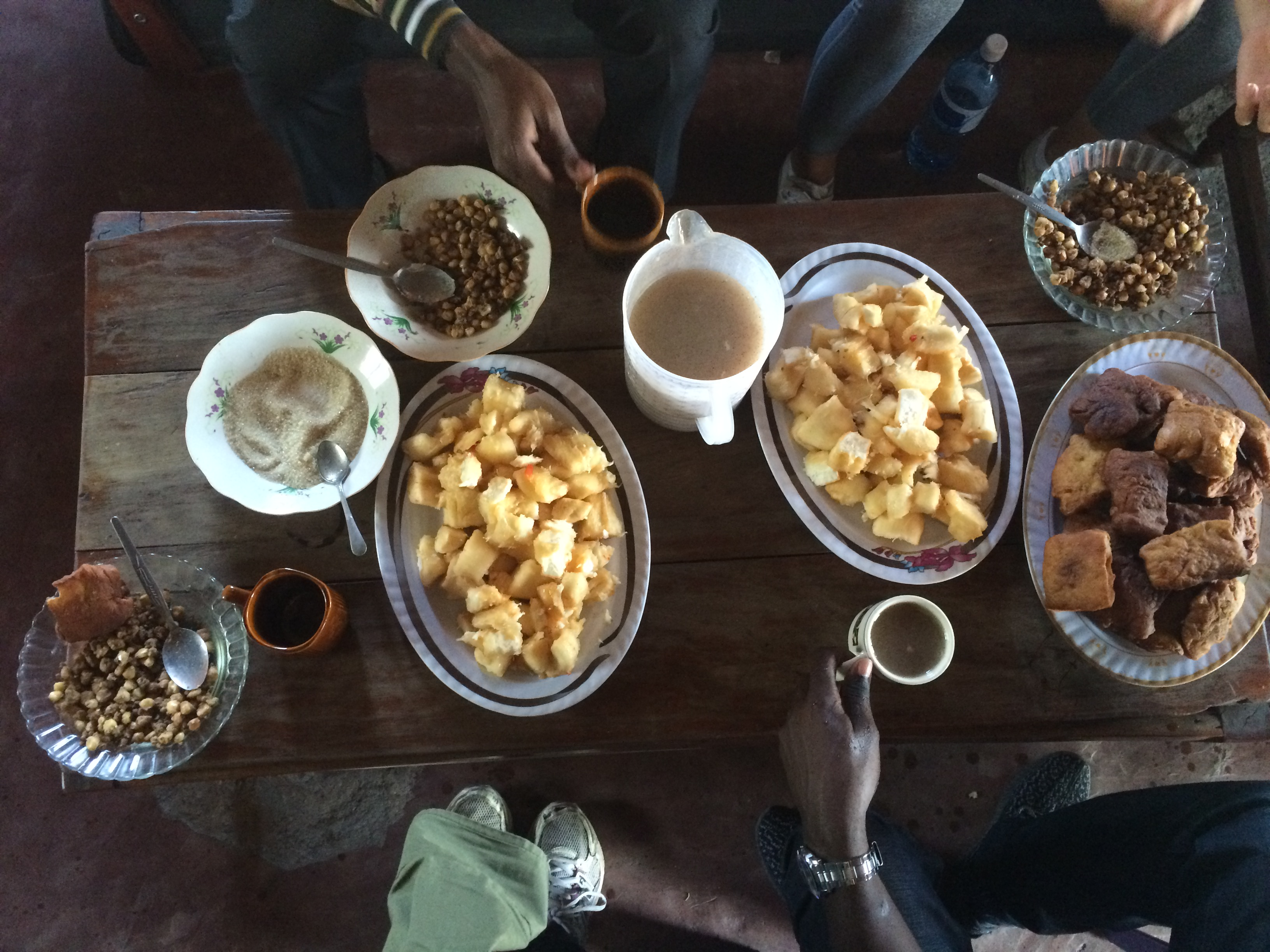
Mahamri/mandazi (Swahili doughnuts) served with miagna (cassava), cooked chickpeas and lentils, and chai

There is no singular dish that represents all of Kenya's wide cuisine. Different communities have their own native foods. Staples are maize and other cereals depending on the region, including millet and sorghum eaten with various meats and vegetables. The foods that are universally eaten in Kenya are ugali, sukuma wiki, and nyama choma. Kenya's coastal cuisine is unique and highly regarded throughout the country.

Sukuma wiki, a Swahili phrase which literally means "to push the week", is a simple dish made with greens similar to kale or collards that can also be made with cassava leaves, sweet potato leaves, or pumpkin leaves. Its Swahili name comes from the fact that it is typically eaten to "get through the week" or "stretch the week".

Nyama choma is grilled meat, which can be considered as an unofficial national dish—usually goat or sheep—while kuku choma is grilled chicken. It is usually cooked over an open fire. It is usually eaten with ugali and kachumbari, maharagwe (bean stew) and mchicha (shredded spinach). It is served as a traditional meal on Christmas Day.

Among the Luhya residing in the western region of the country, ingokho (chicken) with ugali is a favorite meal. Other than these, they also eat tsisaka, miroo, managu and other dishes.

In the Rift Valley, the Kalenjin have long made mursik, which they have with kimyet (ugali) and vegetable relishes such as isageek and "socheek". Also among the Kikuyu of Central Kenya, many tubers, including ngwaci (sweet potatoes), ndũma (taro root, known in Kenya as arrowroot), ikwa (yams), and mianga (cassava) are eaten, as well as legumes like beans and a Kikuyu bean known as njahi.

Among the Luo residing on the western region around Lake Victoria, kuon (ugali) and rech (fish) is a favourite, as well as gweno (chicken), aliya" (sun-dried meat), onyoso (type of ant), ng'wen (termitoidae), dede (grasshoppers), various birds and green vegetables; alode such as osuga, akeyo, muto, dodo, dek, apoth and bo, are all consumed with ugali.

Around the country, distinct differences may be noted based on what foods are locally available in each area. Grains are a staple food for groups that grow grains (such as the Kikuyu, Embu, Meru, and Kisii). Other communities such as the Luo and the Coastal community have fish and seafood for their staple food as these are available in such areas. In semi-arid areas like Turkana, foods made from sorghum are more common staple foods.

Towards the city, foods eaten by working families vary according to preference and ethnicity. Rice and stew are more common with working families, as are other dishes like chapati, a staple that originated from India (similar to the flatbread paratha), and chicken stew.

== National dress ==
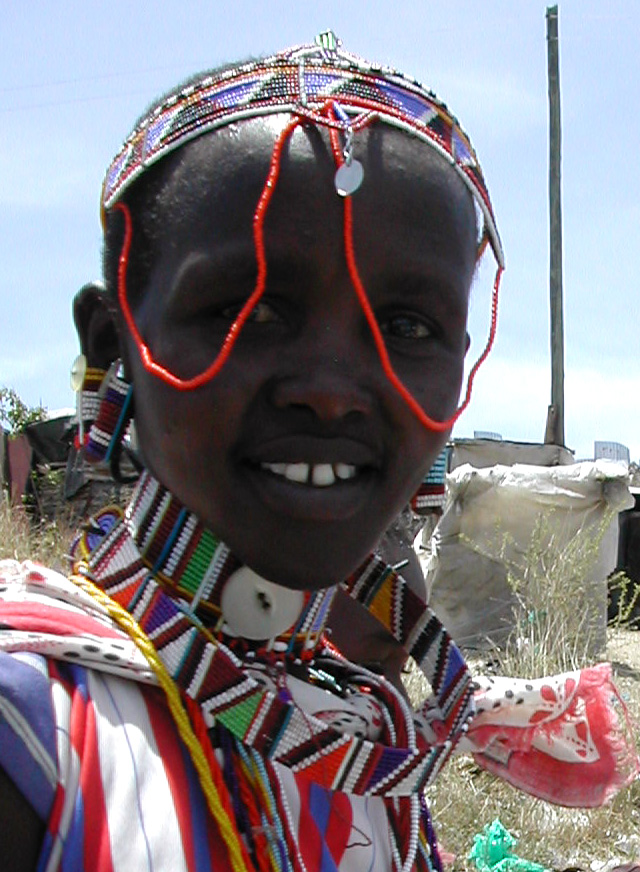
Maasai woman in traditional headdress and attire.

Apart from its national flag, Kenya does not have a national dress that transcends its diverse ethnic divisions. With more than 42 ethnic communities having their own traditional practices and symbols unique to them, this is a task that has proved elusive. However, several attempts have been made to design an outfit that can be worn as a national dress, much like the Kente cloth of Ghana.

Kitenge is a cotton fabric made into colours and design through tie-and-dye and heavy embroidery. It is commonly worn by a number of Kenya's populations. Though also worn in many other African countries, Kitenge is yet to be accepted in Kenya as an official dress as it is only worn during ceremonies and non-official functions. The Maasai wear dark red garments to symbolise their love for the earth and their dependence on it. It also stands for courage and blood that is given to them by nature.

The Kanga (Khanga, Lesso) is another cloth that is commonly worn in practically every Kenyan home. The Kanga is a piece of clothing about 1.5 metres (4 ft 11 in) by 1 metre (3 ft 3 in), screen printed with beautiful sayings in Swahili (or English) and is largely worn by women around the waist and torso.

== Music ==
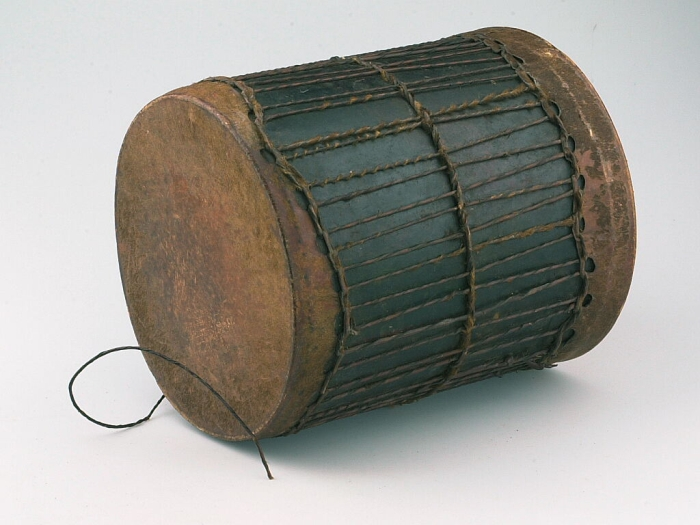
A traditional Kenyan drum, similar to the Djembe of West Africa.

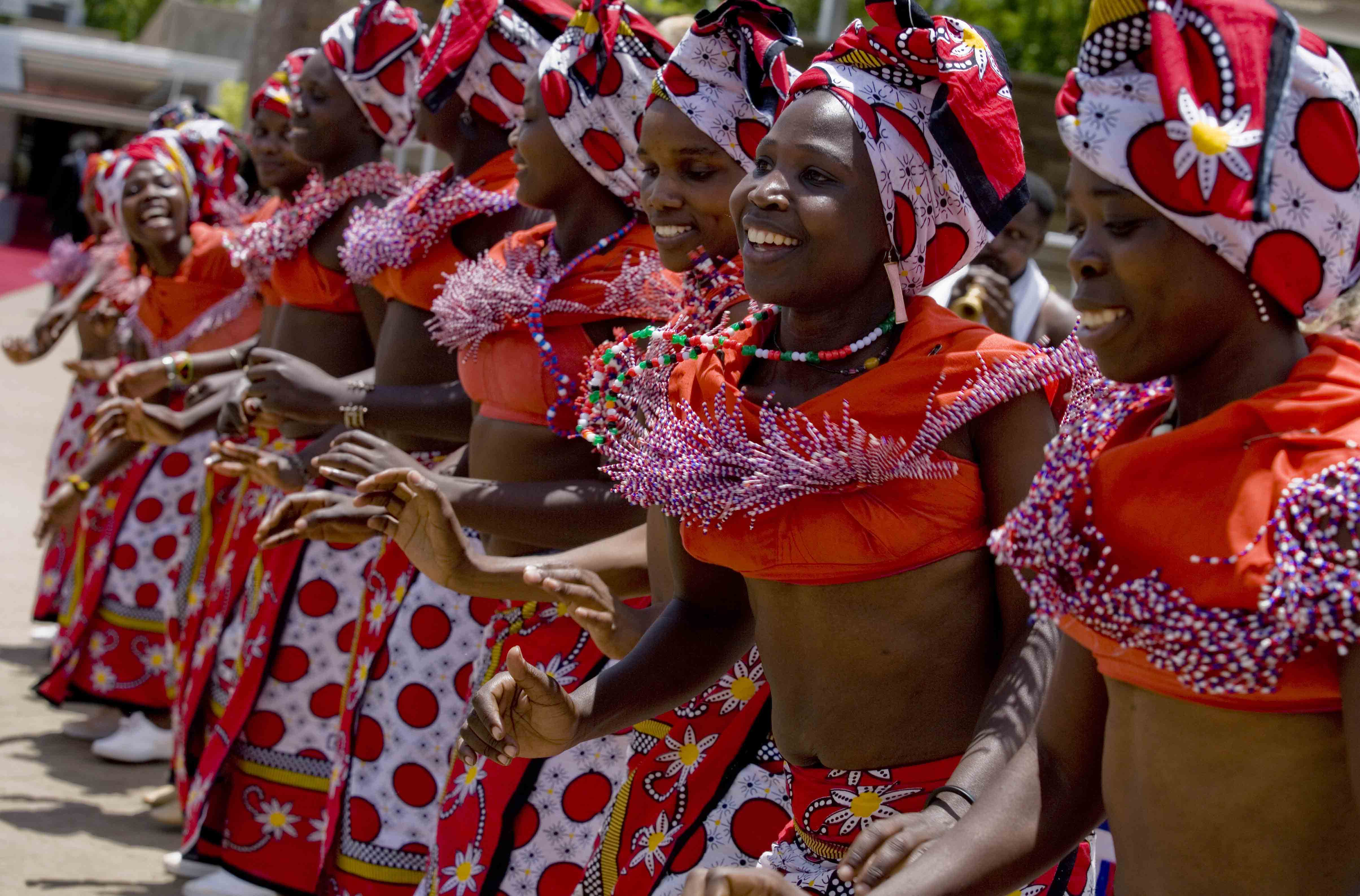
Kenyan dancers performing a traditional dance

Kenya is home to a diverse range of music styles, ranging from imported popular music, afro-fusion and benga music to traditional folk songs. The guitar is the most popular instrument in Kenyan music, and songs often feature intricate guitar rhythms. The most famous guitarist of the early 20th century was Bonie Makie. Other notable musicians of the 60s era include Fadhili Williams, recognised by many as the author of the hit song "Malaika" that was later re-done by Miriam Makeba, Boney M and Daudi Kabaka.

Popular music in the 1980s and 1990s in Kenya could be divided into two genres: the Swahili sound and the Congolese sound. There are varying regional styles, and some performers create tourist-oriented "hotel pop" that is similar to western music. Them Mushrooms, later renamed Uyoga, was one of the popular groups in this era.

In the recent past, newer varieties of modern popular music have arisen which are mostly local derivatives of western hip-hop. Two subgenres have emerged: "Genge" and "Kapuka" beats. This has revolutionised popular Kenyan music and created an industry dominated by the youth. There is also underground Kenyan hip hop that gets less radio play than Kapuka or Genge because it is less club oriented and more focussed on social commentary. Early pioneers include Poxi Presha, Kalamashaka, and K-South. In Nairobi, hip-hop is viewed as more of a style than as a musical culture. There is a great correlation between the youth who listen to rap music and their economical status in the country with the majority of them coming from wealthy economic backgrounds. Since hip-hop is portrayed through clothing, magazines, and CDs, all of which are expensive, only the wealthier individuals are able to enjoy these luxuries.

Mainstream artists include Nameless, Redsan, Necessary Noize, Nonini, Juacali, Kleptomaniax, Longombas, Suzzanna Owiyo, Achieng Abura, Eric Wainaina and others. Their sounds run the gamut from Reggae/Ragga, Pop, Afro-Fusion to Hip-Hop. Contemporary Kenyan music is becoming quite popular, with African-based music channels such as Channel O and MTV Base, giving them a greater audience(a hybrid of Kenyan languages and English/Swahili).

The Kisima Music Awards, which recognise musical talent across East Africa, were founded and are currently based in Kenya. Every year numerous Kenyan artists take out categories in the scheme.

The African Children's Choir features children, many of whom are orphaned, from Kenya, as well as from other neighbouring African countries.

== Literature ==
Kenya National Theatre plays a significant role in Literature by providing platform to most of the local artists, particularly for spoken word and stage acting performances. Artists like "Kennet B" and his group at National Theatre have had great performances in High schools and in the local Radio and Television. A lot of wax painting and color printing done within villages like Kibra and Railway Museum significantly describe Kenyan literature.

Additionally, students in Kenyan High Schools have studied many "set books" from various Kenyan authors like Ngugi wa Thiong'o, Margaret Ogola, Meja Mwangi among others. Their works considerably explore the political, social-economic and contemporary themes in Kenya. Other places that one can experience the Kenyan creatives are Sarakasi Dome.

== Art ==
Around Lake Turkana exist ancient petroglyphs depicting human figures and animals. Bantu tribes build funeral posts, where carvings of human heads atop geometric designs are still created. Though the original posts no longer exist, the more recent creations are thought to be a continuation of the practice. The Kikuyu people also uphold the designs of ancient tradition through the designs painted on their shields.

== Media ==
=== Film ===
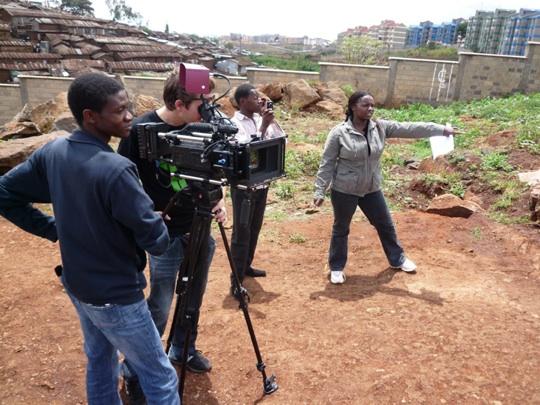
Filmmaker Nathan Collett (with camera) shooting feature film Togetherness Supreme in collaboration with Kibera youth trainees.

The government has not been very supportive of the film industry in Kenya resulting in the release of only few locally made films. However, a number of foreign productions have been shot in the country. Such most recent movie is the award-winning The Constant Gardener directed by Fernando Meirelles and starring Ralph Fiennes and Rachel Weisz. Other films shot in Kenya in the recent past include the Academy Award winning Nowhere in Africa and Lara Croft Tomb Raider: The Cradle of Life.

Sheena, Queen of the Jungle won great acclaim in the 1980s and was one of the first foreign movies to be shot entirely on location in Kenya. Other highly acclaimed films set (and shot) in Kenya include Karen Blixen's Out of Africa, starring Robert Redford and Meryl Streep and directed by Sydney Pollack, and Born Free, an adaptation of the autobiography of Joy Adamson. In 1999, part of the movie To Walk With Lions, which featured actor Richard Harris, was shot on location in the country. Notable film actors from Kenya include Paul Onsongo, David Mulwa, Sidede Onyulo, John Sibi Okumu and Njeri Osaak.

Die Weiße Massai (The White Masai), a German movie about a Swiss Woman who fell in love with a Samburu (Maasai) warrior; won an Award as the best Foreign language Movie (2006) though it was received very poorly in Kenya itself. Rise and Fall of Idi Amin, based on the Ugandan dictator, was shot in Kenya and is considered one of the most successful movies produced and directed by a Kenyan (Sharad Patel). Indigenous Kenyan filmmakers include Ingolo Wa Keya, Albert Wandago and Judy Kibinge. Nowhere in Africa (Nirgendwo in Afrika – 2001), an award-winning German production, tells a story about German Jewish refugees living in Kenya during Second World War. Most of the movie is set in Kenya and numerous scenes show actors, either Kenyans or main German actors, speaking Swahili.

Some of the latest notable productions include the footage screened to the music of U2, Robbie Williams, R.E.M. and other acts at the Live 8 concerts in Europe and the US in July 2005, Africa Mon Amor, shot over a period of three months in Samburu, Shaba and Lamu with a renowned German actress, Iris Berben, in 2006.

The Kenya Film Commission (KFC) was established by the Kenyan government in 2005, but only became fully operational in mid-2006.

=== Television ===
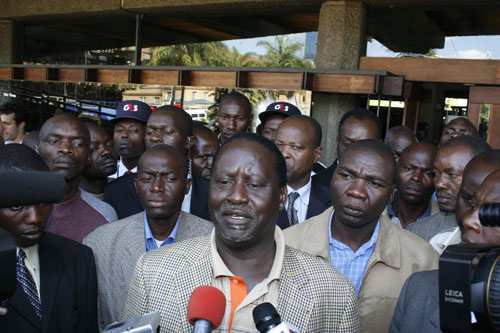
Former Prime Minister Raila Odinga speaking to the Kenyan media.

Acting for television has proved popular with the Kenyan audience. This genre has been around from the 1960s when actors like Mzee Pembe graced the Kenyan television screen. Others, like Benson Wanjau (Ojwang' Hatari) and Mary Khavere (Mama Kayai), followed later with their comedies presented exclusively in Swahili, reaching millions of households courtesy of Kenya Broadcasting Corporation television station.

Serious Television drama was witnessed for the first time in the early 1990s with the entry of popular actors like Packson Ngugi, BMJ Muriithi alias Ben Mutua Jonathan Muriithi and Betty Achieng', alongside other thespians who featured in a variety of TV shows following the liberalisation of the airwaves by the Kenyan government. Tushauriane, a Swahili television series featuring Kenyan fine actors like Dennis Kashero and Tony Msalame had premiered in the late 1980s becoming arguably one of the most popular productions to ever hit the Kenyan TV screens.

A new genre in the form of stand-up comedy followed when actor Joni Nderitu entered the scene. The new style was later to be perfected by the group, 'Redykyulass', a trio of young Kenyans – Walter Mong'are, Tony Njuguna and John Kiare (KJ) – who specialized in political satire. They lampooned not only the establishment but also Daniel arap Moi, the Kenyan President at the time. The lampooning of the Kenyan head of state was unprecedented and could have easily led to their prosecution, or even detention without trial, had it been done in the 1980s, when mimicking the head of state and exhibiting any form of political dissent was considered treason.

Other Stations known to promote theatre in Kenya include Nation TV, Kenya Television Network (KTN) a Citizen TV, all based in the nation's capital, Nairobi. K24, the newest TV station to enter the scene, started its test run in Nairobi in December 2007. It captured the interest of many mainly because of the introduction of Jeff Koinange, one of the most popular Kenyan journalists who has worked for major international media houses like CNN, as its chief News anchor.

A satellite- and Internet-based 24-hour pan-African TV channel, A24, was scheduled to start broadcasting from Nairobi in 2008. This will be in honor and memory of world-renowned and award-winning Kenyan Photojournalist, Mohamed Amin.

== Theatre ==
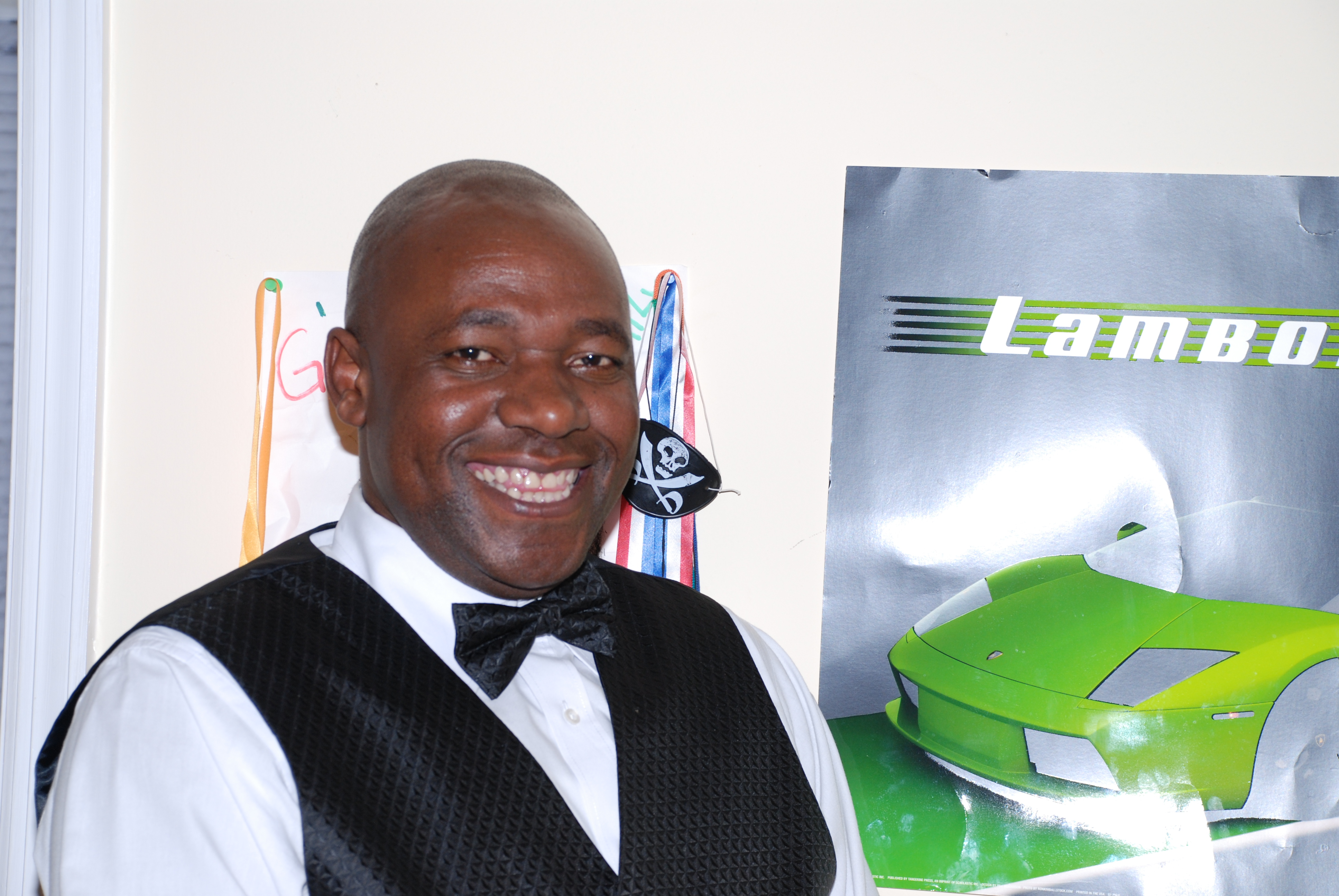
BMJ, A US-based award-winning Kenyan actor. His role in South African Post Apartheid play 'Sizwe Bansi is Dead' by Arthol Fugard earned him the best actor award in Oslo, Norway.

Kenya holds an annual drama event, the Kenya schools and colleges drama festival which brings together thespians and students from around the country. The Kenya National Theatre is based in Nairobi opposite the Norfolk Hotel. Notable theatre performing groups include Eliud Abuto's Festival of Creative Arts that stages regular stage performances at both the Kenya National Theatre and Alliance Francaise, Phoenix Players based at the Professional Centre, Heartstrings Ensemble and Mombasa Little Theatre Club based in Mombasa.

Notable names on the Kenyan theatre scene include actresses Stella Awinja Muka and Anne Wanjugu (both deceased), Liz Njaga and Idi Achieng'. Thespians like Steve Mwenesi, Paul Onsongo, Njeri Osaak, Ben Mutua Jonathan Muriithi popularly known as BMJ Muriithi, Gilbert Lukalia, Joseph Murungu and Packson Ngugi are just but a few of notable TV, stage and film actors from the country. Renowned director Tirus Gathwe cut a niche for himself and is perhaps one of the most well known theatre directors in Kenya today. In the late 1990s through the early 2000s, Wahome Mutahi followed in the footsteps of the legendary Ngũgĩ wa Thiong'o when he, through Igiza Productions, teamed up with Tirus Gathwe and embarked on a project dubbed "taking Theatre to the people" which saw them stage numerous productions, mainly political satires, at nightspots throughout the country.

Other notable directors include Carole Odongo, Mbeki Mwalimu, Mumbi Kaigwa as well as Nice Githinji (who is also an award-winning actor) are some of the most popular female directors in Kenya. George Mungai of Phoenix, Keith Pearson, Sammy Mwangi, Gilbert Lukalia, John Sibi-Okumu and Victor Ber are well known directors too.

== Video gaming ==
Video gaming is a young and rapidly growing sector in Kenya. Though various start-up companies have appeared in the country since 2007, the existing businesses are dealing with funding issues and few successes have been made. However, shared spaces, support programs and government grants introduced over the past few years have allowed the industry to grow large in a short period of time. The introduction of broadband internet in 2009 spawned a generation of young ICT savvy people in the country and the Kenyan game industry is as of 2015 among the largest in Africa.

In 2016, the industry has grown rapidly and continues with popular video game entertainment companies such as Gaming For Kenya, NAICCON and Nexgen Gaming handling major events in the country as well as promoting the gaming culture. Gaming For Kenya, otherwise known as G4k, have held several gaming events from LAN parties to eSports competitive events since they began. Others include video game retailers such as Vivid Gold, Gamechanger, and GametroniQ that have dominated in terms of supplying gamers with console-based games for PlayStation and Xbox. Also prevalent are gaming lounges where gamers sit down to enjoy which are several in number. The largest and most advanced gaming lounge being Tric Gaming Lounge followed by GameMasters, The Score Gaming Lounge and many more. So far sponsorships have been growing with interest in the industry with the likes of ASUS and Red Bull having their presence at most of the gaming events.

In terms of events, there are several informal tournaments that are held within Nairobi city and some major towns in the country. The most renowned event being the 1UP Elite LAN parties held by G4k. A large number of gamers attend their events to connect with other gamers in a social ambiance and play with each other. In eSports, there are roughly established bodies governing eSports events with the likes of the Kenya International Gaming Series dubbed as "K.IN.G.S", the Vivid Gold Summer Tournaments, KAGE and many more.

A new culture has also been adopted whereby some gamers in Kenya have also started their own YouTube and Twitch channels. Regionally, they are the most known gaming YouTubers.They use this platform to connect with their audience and build a strong following. They usually go by their gaming nicknames are otherwise known as gamertag, Jazi Neon, Gatman, King StevenNOS, Davy Kamanzi, The Watchmen, The Golden General, HastheemoHD, Ayax and many others. They have a progressively growing audience.

== Christmas ==
Christmas is a public holiday in Kenya, celebrated on 25 December. Because of its traffic, most Kenyans escape the mass exodus of urban areas to celebrate the festivity by leaving the cities and heading to their rural hometowns to spend the whole month with their families until the New Year.

A very popular traditional Christmas meal of Kenya is nyama choma. Similar to barbecue, it includes the grilling of meat, such as beef, chicken, lamb and goat.

On Christmas Eve, churches are full of worshippers who hold night vigils, known in Swahili as Kesha. They are often recreated as a holy event with nativity scenes. At midnight, churches ring their bells to mark the birth of Christ, while people perform carols to mark the beginning of Christmas Day.

== See also ==
- List of African cuisines
- List of ethnic groups of Kenya
- Sport in Kenya
- International Inventories Programme

== Sources ==
- Magicalkenya.com
