= MTV Europe Music Award for Best African Act =

The following is a list of the MTV Europe Music Award winners and nominees for Best African Act.

== Winners and nominees ==
Winners are listed first and highlighted in bold.

=== 2000s ===
Year	Artist	Nationality	Ref
2005
2005	**2Baba**	**Nigeria**	
2005	Kaysha	Democratic Republic of the Congo	
2005	Kleptomaniax	Kenya	
2005	02	Ghana	
2005	Zamajobe	South Africa	
2006
2006	**Freshlyground**	**South Africa**	
2006	Nameless	Kenya	
2006	Juma Nature	Tanzania	
2006	P-Square	Nigeria	
2006	Anselmo Ralph	Angola	
2007
2007	**D'banj**	**Nigeria**	
2007	Chameleone	Uganda	
2007	Hip Hop Pantsula	South Africa	
2007	Jua Cali	Kenya	
2007	Samini	Ghana	

The award was retired in favour of the MTV Africa Music Awards (MAMAs) starting in 2008.

=== 2010s ===
The award returned in 2012, since Best Worldwide Act has been added to the EMAs.

Year	Artist	Nationality	Ref
2012
2012	**D'Banj**	**Nigeria**	
2012	Camp Mulla	Kenya	
2012	Mi Casa	South Africa	
2012	Sarkodie	Ghana	
2012	Wizkid	Nigeria	
2013
2013	**LCNVL**	**South Africa**	
2013	Fuse ODG	Ghana	
2013	Mafikizolo	South Africa	
2013	P-Square	Nigeria	
2013	Wizkid	Nigeria	
2014
2014	**Sauti Sol**	**Kenya**	
2014	Davido	Nigeria	
2014	Goldfish	South Africa	
2014	Diamond	Tanzania	
2014	Toofan	Togo	
2014	Pre-nominations: Mafikizolo; Gangs of Ballet; Tiwa Savage; Anselmo Ralph; Sarkodie		
2015
2015	**Diamond**	**Tanzania**	
2015	Davido	Nigeria	
2015	Yemi Alade	Nigeria	
2015	DJ Arafat	Ivory Coast	
2015	AKA	South Africa	
2015	Pre-nominations: Wizkid; K.O; Stonebwoy; Cassper Nyovest		
2016
2016	**Wizkid**	**Nigeria**	
2016	Black Coffee	South Africa	
2016	Cassper Nyovest	South Africa	
2016	Olamide	Nigeria	
2016	Ali Kiba	Tanzania	
2017
2017	**Davido**	**Nigeria**	
2017	Babes Wodumo	South Africa	
2017	C4 Pedro	Angola	
2017	Nasty C	South Africa	
2017	Nyashinski	Kenya	
2017	WizKid	Nigeria	
2018
2018	**Tiwa Savage**	**Nigeria**	
2018	Distruction Boyz	South Africa	
2018	Davido	Nigeria	
2018	Nyashinski	Kenya	
2018	Fally Ipupa	Democratic Republic of the Congo	
2018	Shekinah	South Africa	
2019
2019	**Burna Boy**	**Nigeria**	
2019	Harmonize	Tanzania	
2019	Nasty C	South Africa	
2019	Prince Kaybee	South Africa	
2019	Teni	Nigeria	
2019	Toofan	Togo	

=== 2020s ===
Year	Artist	Nationality	Ref
2020
2020	**Master KG**	**South Africa**	
2020	Burna Boy	Nigeria	
2020	Rema	Nigeria	
2020	Kabza De Small and DJ Maphorisa	South Africa	
2020	Sheebah	Uganda	
2020	Gaz Mawete	Democratic Republic of the Congo	
2021
2021	**Wizkid**	Nigeria	
2021	Diamond Platnumz	Tanzania	
2021	Focalistic	South Africa	
2021	Tems	Nigeria	
2021	Amaarae	Ghana	
2022
2022	**Burna Boy**	Nigeria	
2022	Ayra Starr	Nigeria	
2022	Black Sherif	Ghana	
2022	Musa Keys	South Africa	
2022	Tems	Nigeria	
2022	Zuchu	Tanzania	
2023
2023	**Diamond Platnumz**	**Tanzania**	
2023	Asake	Nigeria	
2023	Burna Boy	Nigeria	
2023	Libianca	Cameroon	
2023	Tyler ICU	South Africa	
2024
2024	**Tyla**	**South Africa**	
2024	Asake	Nigeria	
2024	Ayra Starr	Nigeria	
2024	DBN Gogo	South Africa	
2024	Diamond Platnumz	Tanzania	
2024	TitoM & Yuppe	South Africa	
