= 2006 Kisima Music Awards =

Kenyan music awards

The 2006 Kisima Music Awards recognised and rewarded music talent in East Africa. The Kenyan based Kisima Music Awards were held on July 15, 2006 at Carnivore in Nairobi. They were the first of the awards to be broadcast across Africa on television, after the organisers partnered with South African satellite station Channel O, and were also the first to feature a "Social Responsibility" award category. The motto for the ceremony was "Our Heritage of Splendor", and featured acts included Juma Nature, Obsessions and Nameless.

The event encountered controversy when at least five artists refused to play at a later charity concert, citing that they had not entered a performing contract with the Kisima Music Trust.

== Winners ==
Category	Winner (Artist – Track)
Afro Fusion	Nameless – Sinzia
Asian Music	DJ Sak – Kassam
Boomba Male	Jua Cali – Kiasi
Boomba Female	Ida Onyango – Don’t Stop
Boomba Group	Longombas – Vuta Pumz
Contemporary Gospel	Esther Wahome – Asali
Eastern Benga	Generation Afrika Band – Fitina
Gospel Ensembles	Voices United Choir – Lamo
Hip hop	Ukoo Flani Mau Mau – Kimya, Vigeti, Ibra da Hustla – Punchlines Kibao
R&B	Nikki – Hii Ngoma
Ragga	Wyre – Make A Choice
Reggae	Ousmane – Nuks
Traditional	Kenge Kenge – Amilo Nyakolal
Western Benga	Dola Kabarry – Isando Chunya
Best Producer	Musyoka (Homeboyz Entertainment)
Best Song from Uganda	Chameleone – Mama Rhoda
Best Music Video from Uganda	Chameleone – Mama Rhoda
Best Song from Tanzania	Langa – Matawi ya Juu
Best Video from Tanzania	Professor Jay ft Ferooz – Nikusaidiaje
Best Collaboration	Amani & Nyashiski – Badboy
Best Music Video from Kenya	Nameless – Sinzia
Best Song from Kenya	Longombas – Vuta Pumz
Most Promising Artist	STL
Best Male Artist from Kenya	Nameless
Best Female Artist from Kenya	Amani
Best Group from Kenya	Longombas
Social Responsibility	Longombas
