= Boomba music =

Music genre

- Stylistic origins: Hip hop, reggae, traditional African music
- Cultural origins: 1990s Nairobi, Kenya
- Typical instruments: Rapping, vocals, keyboard, sampler
- Derivative forms: Kenyan hip hop

Subgenres
- Vegatone, Kapuka rap

Regional scenes
- Kenya

Boomba music, also referred to as kapuka (due to the beat pattern; not to be confused with kapuka rap), is a form of hip pop music popular in Kenya. It incorporates hip hop, reggae and African traditional musical styles. The lyrics are in Swahili, Sheng or local dialects. It is associated with the Ogopa Deejays and is believed to have originated in the late 1990s with artists such as Redsan, Bebe Cool and Chameleone. It went on to dominate East African airwaves (especially Kenya and Uganda) after the release of the Ogopa Deejays' first album in 2001, which included artists such as the late E-Sir, Nameless, Mr. Lenny, Amani, Mr. Googz and Vinnie Banton amongst others.

The over-saturation of playlists with this music style caused some to criticise it, including the artists K-South who had a hit titled "Kapuka This, Kapuka That". This also led to other styles such as genge music being formed by producer Clemo to diversify the market. Despite the critics the music continues to be very popular in Kenya although more so now in Uganda. Of late, "genge" has also come to refer more generally to boomba and "kapuka" music.

== Vegatone ==
Vegatone, Riftsyde flava or Naxvegas muzik is a genre of hip hop/Afro Dancehall music that originated from the town of Nakuru or colloquially Naks/NaxVegas as many youths call it. The music is a blend of indigenous kapuka mixed with a reggae baseline. It is characterized by very flashy Musicians who mainly rap and sing about their sexual escapades and the number of women that they keep, but cipher their language to avoid being explicit. Vegatone has evolved in recent times.

Artists in this genre include award-winning artist Teferah who has numerous hits having worked with Nyanda from Brick and Lace on the song "Put It On Me" produced in Romania by Tommo records, and getting signed to an American music label Mpact Muzik in 2017. Teferah is seen as a break-through artist in this genre. Other Vegatone artists are Rhonda Bwoy, Skymer, Juss Nera, Hush BK, Avril, Vivian, K-FRESH, Igiza, Obako, Mavo, 77 and many more. Nakuru is credit for creating the viral sounds of Gengetone which uses the slang used in Nakuru and most Gengetone producers are from Nakuru Sadafa, Mavo on the beat, Duboiz, Samba on the beat, Andah water, Magix Enga and other creatives that fuse Vegatone arrangements. Vegatone is a common sound especially on Kenyan and local nakuru radios highly popularized by Radio presenter Caleb Koyo.

== Kapuka rap ==
Kapuka rap is a genre of hip hop music that is derived from Boomba music, but incorporates more dance-pop, synthpop and electronic music than reggae and ragga but still incorporates some hip hop. Artists such as Collo and Camp Mulla incorporate kapuka rap in some of their songs.

=== Examples ===
- "KArE" – P-Unit (incorporates a lot of synthpop and some hip hop)
- "Party Don't Stop" – Camp Mulla (incorporates some electronic dance music)
- "Feel No Pain" – Camp Mulla (incorporates some electronic dance music)
- "Chini ya Maji" -Collo (incorporates some trip hop and some hip hop)

== See also ==
- Kenyan hip hop
- Genge, another form of Kenyan hip-hop
