= Gidi Gidi Maji Maji =

Kenyan hip hop duo

Gidi Gidi Maji Maji (also known as GidiGidi MajiMaji or GidigidiMajimaji) is a Kenyan hip hop duo from Nairobi. Its two members are Maji Maji (Julius Owino) and Gidi Gidi (Joseph Ogidi). Their lyrics are mostly in Luo language, with some English and Swahili. Unlike most local hip hop artists, GidiGidi MajiMaji do willingly mix African rhythms with their music. According to popular entertainment guide Ghafla, their music is a "fusion of hip hop/rap and African music [which] they mostly sing and rap in their native language called Luo."

They released their debut album, Ismarwa, in June 2000. The album was produced by Tedd Josiah. Two years later they came with their biggest hit to date Unbwogable and an album of the same name. The song was also adopted as an anthem for Mwai Kibaki's victorious presidential election campaign, whose party used their favorite song "Unbwogable" as their political anthem.

Later Gidi Gidi Maji Maji signed with the South African Gallo Record Company, and consequently released their third album, Many Faces, in 2003. They won two awards at the 2003 Kisima Music Awards, including best overall group category. After releasing Many Faces album they toured in the USA and Europe, but since then the group has been inactive apart from occasional performances. Gidi Gidi said in an interview in 2009, that the group is having a break as both members of the duo are involved with other activities.

Their song "Ting Badi Malo" appeared on the Rough Guide to the Music of Kenya compilation CD, released in 2004 by the Rough Guides.

== Discography ==
Album “Unbwogable”

- Unbwogable Intro
- Who Can Bwogo me?
- Kamulango Skit
- Atoti
- Outro

Album “ Ismarwa”

- Giko Chako
- Mayie
- Chwodho Style ( Ting Badi Malo)
- Nyako Aheri
- Miela Miela
- Oruu
- Fikira
- Dala
- Gidd’s Dream
- Nyarasembo
- Mama Aol
- Chunya Jamirima
- Toch Omenyore
- Ayaye
- The Bar
- Nyon Tiendi Piny
- Sababu Yako
- Wayiego
- Outro

Album “Many Faces”

- Many Faces
- Tumbo
- Atoti Pt. 2
- Lazima Tunone
- African Womano
- Huu Ni Mwaka
- Lady Lando
- Oruu
- Chupa
- Heartfelt (Butterflies)
- Pay Day
- East Meets South
- Tuko Sa
- Unbwoggable
- They are now musically irrelevant though still very relevant.

== See also ==
- Luo people of Kenya and Tanzania
