= Amani (musician) =

Kenyan singer and songwriter

- Born: Cecilia Wairimu; 28 November 1980 (age 45); Thika, Kiambu, Kenya
- Origin: Nairobi, Kenya
- Genres: Pop; R&B; African pop
- Occupations: Singer; songwriter
- Instrument: Vocals
- Years active: 1999–present
- Label: Ogopa Deejays

Cecilia Wairimu (born 28 November 1980), better known by her stage name Amani, is a Kenyan singer and songwriter. Her contributions to the Kenyan music industry have earned her several coveted accolades, including the Best Female category at the 2009 MTV Africa Music Awards, Pearl of Africa Music Awards, Kisima Awards, and Chaguo La Teeniez Awards. She released her debut album in 2006.

== Career ==
=== Beginnings ===
Amani attended Bishop Gatimu Ngandu Girls High School, where she was part of the a cappella group Sobriety. She signed a record deal with Ogopa Deejays in 1999, right after graduating from high school. She enrolled at the United States International University in 2000 and studied international business administration.

=== Career breakthrough: 2000–06; Tamani ===
Her debut single "Move On" was a radio hit. She released her follow-up singles "Tahidi" and "Papii" in 2001. Her 2002 collaboration with Nameless, titled "Ninanoki", was a major national hit. Her later singles include "Talk to You" (featuring Patonee and Big Pin), "Bad Boy" (featuring Nyashinski of Kleptomaniax), Usiwe Mbali (featuring AY), "Tamani", "Missing My Baby", and "Tonight".

She is currently the brand Ambassador for Airtel Kenya.

Her debut album, Tamani, was released in 2006. She has toured in the United States, Norway, Germany, the United Kingdom, Namibia, Tanzania, and Uganda. Moreover, she has performed in Dubai, Nigeria, Senegal, South Africa, Liberia and Djibouti.

=== 2010–present: Grand comeback to the music industry ===
In 2010, Amani was featured on "Hands Across The World", a song written and produced by R Kelly. The song serves as the first release for the African supergroup One 8, composed of Amani, Ali Kiba, Navio, Fally Ipupa, 2face Idibia, JK, 4x4, and Movaizhaleine. Described as "an uplifting ballad" by Billboard's Diane Coetzer, the song was released by Rockstar 4000 Music Entertainment.

In 2013, she worked with Uganda's dancehall duo Radio & Weasel to release the song "Kiboko Changu", which serves as the lead single off her latest album. In 2015, she released the single "Kizungu Zungu". In July 2015, she released the reggae and dancehall-influenced song "Heartbreaker". Its music video was shot at Nairobi's Garden Estate and officially released on 8 September 2015.

Cecilia Wairimu got born again in 2018 with 'My God' and 'Upendo' being some of her songs as a born again Christian.

== Discography ==
=== Singles and studio albums ===
Year	Single	Album	Ref(s)
2000	"Move On"	Tamani	
2001	"Tahidi"	Tamani	
2001	"Papii"	Tamani	
2002	"Ninanoki" (Amani featuring Nameless)	Tamani	
2006	"Missing My Baby"	Tamani	
2008	"Usiwe Mbali Nami" (Amani featuring AY)	TBA	
2009	"Tonight"	TBA	
2013	"Kiboko Changu" (Amani featuring Radio & Weasel)	TBA	
2015	"Kizungu Zungu"	TBA	
2015	"Heartbreaker"	TBA	

== Awards and nominations ==
Year	Association	Award	Nominated work	Result	Ref(s)
2002	Chaguo La Teeniez Awards	Best Female Artist	—	Nominated	
2006	2006 Kisima Music Awards	Female Artiste of the year	—	Won	
2006	2006 Kisima Music Awards	Collabo of the year	"Bad Boy" with Nyashiski	Won	
2006	CHAT Awards	Favourite Female Artiste	—	Won	
2006	CHAT Awards	Favourite Song	—	Won	
2006	CHAT Awards	Favourite Collabo	—	Won	
2006	Pearl of Africa Music Awards	Best Kenyan Female Artiste	—	Nominated	
2007	2007 Kisima Music Awards	Boomba Female	—	Won	
2007	Pearl of Africa Music Awards (PAM Awards)	Best Female Artist (Kenya)	—	Won	
2007	Tanzania Music Awards	Best East African Song	"Bad Boy"	Won	
2008	Tanzania Music Awards	Best East African Song	"Missing My Baby"	Nominated	
2008	Channel O Music Video Awards	Best R&B video in Africa	"Missing My Baby"	Nominated	
2008	Channel O Music Video Awards	Best East African Song	"Missing My Baby"	Nominated	
2009	Channel O Music Video Awards	Best Female Video	"Tonight"	Nominated	
2009	Channel O Music Video Awards	Best R&B video	"Tonight"	Nominated	
2009	Channel O Music Video Awards	Best East African	"Tonight"	Nominated	
2009	Channel O Music Video Awards	Video of the Year	"Tonight"	Nominated	
2009	MTV Africa Music Awards 2009	Best Female	—	Won	
2014	MTV Africa Music Awards 2014	Best Collaboration	"Kiboko Changu" featuring Radio and Weasel	Nominated	

=== Recognitions ===
- Pure and Natural Most Inspiring Young Woman 2010.
- Pearl of Africa Music Award-Best Female Artist 2010
