= 2004 Kisima Music Awards =

Kenyan music awards

The 2004 Kisima Music Awards recognised and rewarded music talent in Kenya. The Kisima Music Awards ceremony was held on June 19, 2004 at Carnivore. The ceremony was hosted by veteran music artist Eric Wainaina and radio presenters Patricia Amira and Robert Warobi.

This year's awards featured a newly expanded scheme which aimed to incorporate artists from across East Africa, most predominantly Uganda and Tanzania. It was also a source of controversy when the organisation's CEO Tedd Josiah was awarded the category for Best Producer. Additionally many of the artists from his production house Blu Zebra were declared winners. He subsequently resigned citing a conflict of interest.

There was further concern over how winners were chosen. The voting system used SMS text messaging. There was no system in place to prevent a person from voting multiple times. It was noted before the ceremony that radio play was skewed toward "well-connected" musicians and that mainly young people vote. The issue is that popular artists overshadowed lesser known but talented musicians.

== Winners ==
Category	Winner
Afro Fusion/Benga/Gospel Artist of the Year	Zipporah Muoso
Most promising Artist/Group of the year	Abbi
R&B Artist/Group of the Year	Didge
Best Music Video of the Year	Kenyan Gal Kenyan Boy - Necessary Noize
Central/Eastern Benga Group of the Year	Kayamba Africa
Best Female Artist of the Year from UG & TZ	Ray C
Ragga Artist/Group of the Year	Necessary Noize
Bumba Pop Artist	Nameless
Best Music Producer of the Year	Tedd Josiah – Blu Zebra
Song of the Year	Hallo Hallo – Wakimbizi
Traditional Group of the Year	Kenge Kenge
Western Benga Artist/Group of the Year	Jomenes
Best Music Video of the Year from UG & TZ	Ambassada – Watoto Inkane
Coastal Artist/Group of the Year	Uyoga
Best Female Artist of the Year	Mercy Myra
Best Overall Group of the Year	Necessary Noize
Best Male Artist/Group of the Year from UG & TZ	Deux Vultures
Best Male Artist/Group of the Year	Abbi
Hip hop Artist/Group of the Year	Wakimbizi
Contemporary Gospel Artist/Group of the Year	Catherine Mueni
Afro Fusion Artist/Group of the Year	Yunasi
Best Bhangra Artist/Group of the Year	Amrik Singh & DJ Gupz – Naktra
