= Deux Vultures =

Kenyan musical group

Deux Vultures is a musical group in Kenya performing hip hop and pop music.

The group consists of two members: Colonel Mustapha (real name Daudi Mustapha) and Nasty Thomas (Thomas Konzanga). They grew up in Dar es Salaam, Tanzania. Like many other Kenyan artists, they started their career at jam sessions of the Florida 2000 nightclub in Nairobi. Originally, the group was known as "Desert Vultures" and had as many as 20 members, but soon the group decreased to two members and was renamed Deux Vultures. Their debut single, "Mona Lisa" became a big national hit in Kenya. In 2003, they left Ogopa DJs record label together with Longombas and Mr. Googz & Vinnie Banton and formed their own label, Bad Man Camp. However, Deux Vultures and Longombas later returned to Ogopa. Their album Katika was released around 2004.

Deux Vultures collaborated with benga musician Dola Kabarry on the song "Adhiambo C" . Deux Vultures are also known for their song "Kinyaunyau", which was said to offend women. Female singer and label-mate Wahu released a response to the song, "Kibow Wow", using the same melody and beat as "Kinyaunyau".

They won the best group from Tanzania & Uganda category at the 2004 Kisima Music Awards. They stated that they won the wrong category, since they are a Kenyan group who were just raised in Tanzania. Deux Vultures also received a nomination at the 2008 Kisima Music Awards. Deux Vultures were to have a tour in the US, but their promoters in the US failed to get visas for the group because during a previous tour, Kenyan groups Kleptomaniax and Longombas overstayed their visas.

Colonel Mustafa is working on a solo album as of 2009, but said Deux Vultures still exists and will produce more music
