= Nyashinski =

Kenyan musician (born 1984)

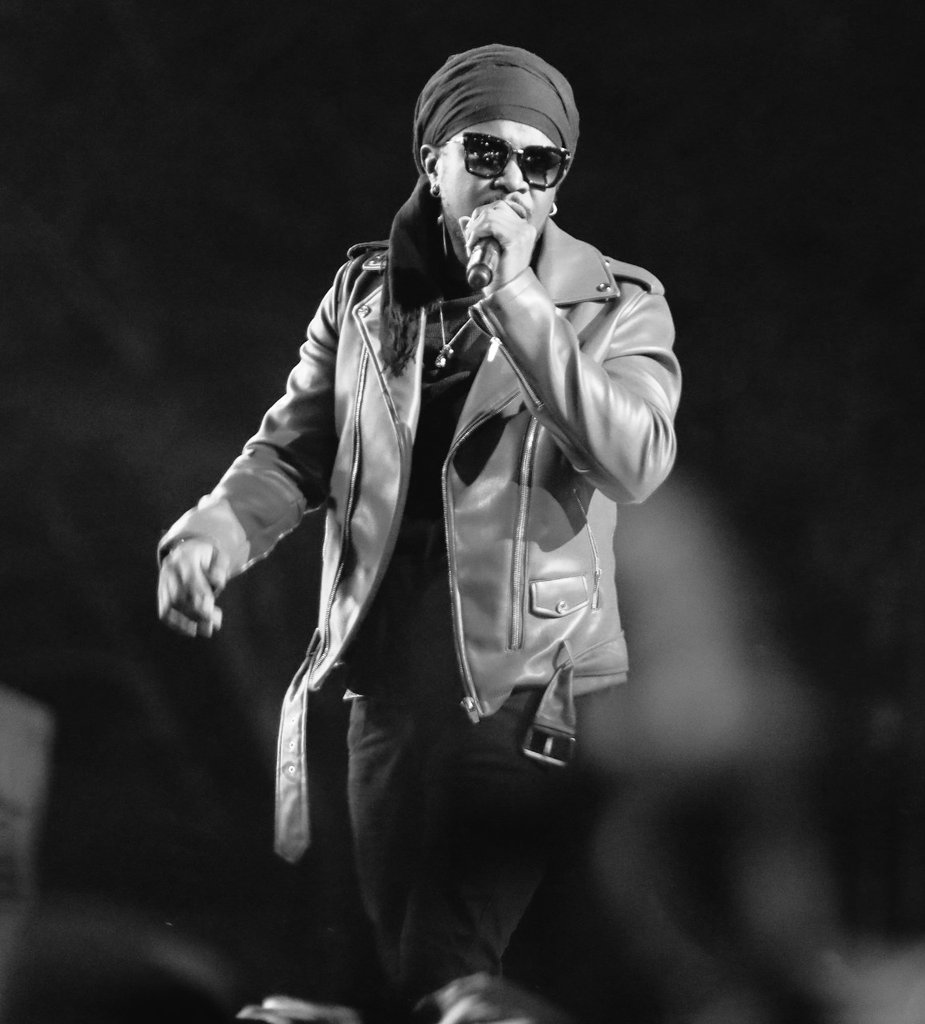
- Nyashinski on stage in 2022

Background information
- Born: Nyamari Ongegu; 8 April 1984 (age 41); Kisii, Kenya
- Genres: Kenyan hip hop: Hip hop
- Occupation: Musician. Writer.
- Years active: 1999–present
- Spouse: Zia Jepkemei Bett

Nyamari Ongegu (born Inyatta Nyamari Ongegu; 8 April 1984), known professionally as Nyashinski, is a Kenyan rapper, singer and songwriter. He is a co-founding member of the hip-hop trio Kleptomaniax before successfully launching his solo career during the 2010s. His 2020 full-length debut album Lucky You demonstrated his lyrical skills and songwriting talents, encompassing lighter, more uplifting songs as well as aggressive street tracks.

== Biography ==
Nyamari Ongegu, who goes by the stage name Nyashinski, was born on 8 April 1984. He attended Nairobi School. On 10 April 2019, Nyashinski whose full birth name was Inyatta Nyamari Ongegu, through a gazette notice announced legally abandoning the use of his first name, Inyatta, instead opted to use Nyamari Ongegu only as his official full name.

Nyashinski lived in Kenya until 2006, when he and his family relocated to Delaware US, where he worked as a truck driver for 10 years until his return to Kenya in 2016 to continue his music career.

In 2019, Nyashinski tied the knot, marrying his longtime girlfriend, designer Zia Jepkemei Bett. Nyashinski and Zia welcomed their first child in 2020.

In 2023, Nyashinski was sued by Nigerian producer Sam Eli, over copyright infringement by signing a copyright deal with Tecno. Eli stated that Nyashinski used his song "Wach Wach" to promote and endorse Tecno products. Eli was demanding a percentage of the earnings from the endorsement deal as he produced the song. In May 2025, Nyashinski won against Eli.

== Music career ==
=== Kleptomaniax ===
Nyashinski's music career started as a member of Kleptomaniax when he was still a high school student at Nairobi School, where he met Roba (Robert Manyasa) and Collo (Collins Majale) who formed the music trio Kleptomaniax back in 1999. Although the members were still high school students, they released their debut track, Freak It in 2002 under Ogopa DJs music label, followed by Maniax Anthem and Haree which were major hits. Tuendelee and Swing released in 2004 were the most popular songs by the trio earning them dozens of awards and nominations. The trio, took a hiatus in 2009 to pursue solo careers.

=== Solo career ===
Nyashinski took a 10-year break from music right after Kleptomaniax hiatus. He made a come back in 2016 with a hit song Now you Know. featuring Athman. His 2017 song Malaika scooped a Mdundo Award for Most Downloaded Male Single in 2017. In January 2024, Nyashinski released the "Good Old Days" EP, which featured 6 tracks. The songs were a blend of R&B and Hip-Hop. In 2022, Nyashinski debuted Shin City, his headline concert.

In 2024, Nyashinski released an Ep, To Whom It May Concern. The EP included six songs. In the EP, he addressed the fall out with long time collaborator, Cedo who worked as his producer.

In October 2025, Nyashinski released his sophomore album Yariasu. It was also announced that he had signed to Sony Music East Africa.

In November 2025, Nyashinski announced his April 2026 residency, Showman.

== Awards and nominations ==
Nyashinski awards and nominations
Awards and nominations
Award	Wins	Nominations

Totals (Note: Certain award groups do not simply award one winner. They acknowledge several different recipients, have runners-up, and have third place. Since this is a specific recognition and is different from losing an award, runner-up mentions are considered wins in this award tally. For simplification and to avoid errors, each award in this list has been presumed to have had a prior nomination.)
- Wins: 2
- Nominations: 5

=== Pulse Music Video Awards ===
Year	Nominee / work	Award	Result
2016	Pulse Music Video Awards	Now you Know	Won

=== MTV Africa Music Awards ===
Year	Nominee / work	Award	Result
2017	Himself	Best African Act	Nominated
2018	Himself	Best African Act	Nominated

=== All Africa Music Awards ===
Year	Nominee / work	Award	Result
2022	Himself	Best Male artiste in Eastern Africa	Nominated

=== East Africa Arts Entertainment Awards ===
Year	Nominee / work	Award	Result
2022	Himself	Best Legendary artiste	Won

== Studio albums ==
- Lucky You (2020).
- Good Old Days (2024).
- To Whom It May Concern (2025).

=== Other singles ===
2016

- Now You Know
- Mungu Pekee

2017

- Malaika
- Hayawani
- Aminia

2018

- Bebi Bebi
- Free
- Hello
- Finyo

2019

- Marathon Runner
- Lift Me Up
- Balance

2020

- Serious
- Hapo Tu (ft Chris Kaiga)

2021

- Properly ft (Femi one)
- Top Form
- Goals
- Whoopty (freestyle)

2022

- Showman
- Night school
- Kable Tudie
- Tunnel Vision

2023

- Perfect design
