= Dola Kabarry =

Kenyan benga musician

Kevin Omondi Migot (born c. 1977) better known for his stage name Dola Kabarry is a benga musician from Kenya. He leads the band Orchestra Super Haki Haki. His songs are mainly in Dholuo language.

His father Barrack Migot led the band Bondo Super Stars. When his father died in 1998, Kabarry took over the band, but left the band soon due to internal rivalry and formed Orchestra Super Haki Haki in 2000. During his early career, he had also played with Okatch Biggy, Awino Lawi and Ouma Jerry among others.

Some of his popular songs by 2003 were "Iwacho Awacha", "Adundo Mum", "Sella" and "Pamela Atoti" Other hits include "Dabed gi Pesa", "Isando Chunya", "Wololo", "Nyar josakwa" both in early 2007 and "Maoni ya Raia".

In 2003, Kabarry was voted "singer of the year" by the Music Composers Association; the award was shared with Suzzana Owiyo. He won the "Western benga" category at the 2006 Kisima Music Awards and was nominated in 2007. His collaboration song with hip hop group Deux Vultures, "Adhiambo C" was also nominated for Kisima Award. Kabarry held a three-month in tour the USA in 2008 and released a new album, Wololo.

His song "Change the World" is dedicated to US presidential candidate Barack Obama. Kabarry was born in Uhembo village in Alego, Siaya District and thus comes from the same area as Obama's father, Barack Obama, Sr.

He has two wives (Angelina and Jane), three daughters and one son (as of 2008). Dola later married his third wife Consolata and they have two children.
