= Mr. Googz =

Mr. Googz (real name Moffat Omari) is a musician, preacher and author from Kenya.

== Biography ==
He grew up in Zimmermann, a suburb of Nairobi. He attended Ainsworth Primary School in Eastleigh, Nairobi and later Highway Secondary School. He teamed up with Vinnie Banton forming a duo. They joined the Ogopa DJs record label. In 1998 they released the "Wasee (Githurai)" song, which became a national hit in Kenya. The song also featured Mr. Lenny and it was dedicated to Githurai, a suburb on the northeastern outskirts of Nairobi. In 2003, they left Ogopa DJs record label together with Longombas and Deux Vultures and formed their own label, Bad Man Camp.

Mr. Googz parted ways with Vinnie Banton in 2004 as both preferred solo careers. Mr. Googz turned from secular to gospel music in 2005. He released his first gospel album His Love in 2006. He has retained his popularity, even after the switch to gospel.

== Awards ==
Won:

- Kisima Music Awards – Reggae Artist of the Year

Nominated:

- 2002 Kora Awards – Most Promising Male
- 2007 Kisima Music Awards – Contemporary Gospel
