= Abbi (musician) =

Kenyan musician

Absalom Nyinza, popularly Abbi, is an Afro-jazz and Afro-fusion musician from Kenya. He is backed by the Kikwetu band. He sings in several languages, including Swahili, English, French, his native Luhya and some other tribal languages.

Abbi started his career in 1993 being a member of a cappella gospel group The Boyz, which was later renamed Safari. He toured the United Kingdom and Germany with the band. Later he was part of Achieng Abura's band, and toured Spain during that time.

His solo debut album, Mudunia was released in 2003. At the 2004 Kisima Music Awards he won two categories: Best male and Most Promising artist. His second album Indigo was released in August 2007. He has performed at Festival Mundial and North Sea Jazz festivals in the Netherlands and toured other countries a well. His music has been produced by Tedd Josiah of Blu Zebra studios.

He has campaigned for the Global Call to Action Against Poverty. He is among the Kenyan artistes who have been sponsored by the Alliance Française in Nairobi.
