= Ogopa Deejays =

- Founded: 1998
- Founder: Francis and Lukas Bikedo
- Genre: Kapuka
- Country of origin: Kenya
- Location: Nairobi, Nairobi County South B
- Official website: Ogopa Deejays

Ogopa Deejays are a Kenyan music production team and record label formed in the late 1990s who gained regional fame and popularity due to standards of their production work.

== Background ==
Ogopa DJs is led by brothers Francis and Lucas Bikedo, along with their manager, Banda. They rarely show their faces in public and do not agree to have their photos taken or published by the Kenyan media.

The team started out producing hit songs for artists such as Bebe Cool, Chameleone and Redsan. They are widely acclaimed to have helped boost the Kenyan urban music scene from obscurity. They are also credited with creating the Boomba (sometimes referred to as Kapuka) style of Kenyan music which is modern hip hop and dancehall influenced by African drums and rhythms. They later formed Ogopa Productions, which also organizes events. They revolutionised Kenyan music in the early 2000s.

They have released three compilation albums and several albums by their artists. Their first album was released in 2001 and was widely popular in East Africa. It also introduced fans to the talents of the late E-Sir and K-Rupt. They are famous for their logo of a red face screaming.

A music producer from Virginia, United States, gave the group a chance to showcase their musical talent in 2003. Tickets sold out in three hours, a record time for this group. Ultimately the show was a huge success and the group planned to start a world tour in 2013.

Their studios are located in South B estate of Nairobi. They have also started a sister label operating in Namibia and South Africa, known as Ogopa Butterfly. They have produced for Namibian, Windhoek based girl duo, Gal Level, and Kenyan-Namibian musician Faizel MC.

In 2018, Ogopa Deejays and Calif Records co-hosted the Ngoma Festival at Uhuru Gardens.

== Signed artists ==
Artists who have been signed to Ogopa Deejays label for at least part of their career (artists who have occasionally recorded with Ogopa are excluded) include:

=== Current acts ===
- Alpha
- Amani
- Colonel Mustafa
- Marya
- Kenzo
- Silas
- Trapee
- Gal Level
- Boomba Boiz
- Rapper willyjay
- Hearts Prince Brown Jr (EsirEaly)

=== Former artists ===
- Avril
- Bebe Cool
- Big Pin
- Chameleone
- Nameless
- Deux Vultures
- E-Sir
- Kleptomaniax
- K-rupt
- Longombas
- Mr. Googz & Vinnie Banton
- Mr. Lenny & Kunguru
- Redsan
- Tattuu
- Wahu

== See also ==
- List of record labels
