= MTV Africa Music Awards 2009 =

The 2nd MTV Africa Music Awards were held on October 10, 2009 at the gymnasium of the Moi International Sports Centre complex in Nairobi, Kenya and were hosted by Haitian-American artist Wyclef Jean.

== Performers ==
There were several performers, such as:

- Wyclef Jean
- Akon
- HHP, Brickz and 2face Idibia
- Wahu, Amani and AY
- Zebra & Giraffe and Da L.E.S

== Categories ==
=== Artist of the Year ===
- 2face Idibia
- D'banj
- HHP
- Lira
- Nameless

=== Best Video ===
- 2face Idibia — "Enter the Place"
- Da L.E.S — "We on Fire"
- HHP — "Mpitse"
- XOD — "I Want You Back"
- Wahu (featuring Bobi Wine) — "Little Things You Do"

=== Best Female ===
- Amani
- Kel
- Lira
- Lizha James
- Zamajobe

=== Best Male ===
- 2face Idibia
- Da L.E.S
- D'Banj
- HHP
- Nameless

=== Best Group ===
- Blu*3
- Gal Level
- Gangs of Instrumentals
- P-Square
- Mo Hits Allstars

=== Best New Act ===
- M.I
- Shaa
- Bigiano
- STL
- Rhythmic Elements

=== Best Alternative ===
- aKing
- Coldplay
- Green Day
- Cassette
- Zebra & Giraffe

=== Best Hip Hop ===
- AY
- M.I
- Jay Z
- Kanye West
- Zulu Boy

=== Best R&B ===
- 2face Idibia
- Beyoncé
- Darey Art Alade
- Akon
- Loyiso

=== Best Live Performer ===
- P-Square
- D'banj
- Samini
- Nameless
- Blu*3

=== Listener's Choice ===
- Nameless — "Sunshine"

=== My Video ===
- Patricke-Stevie Moungondo

=== Legend Award ===
- Lucky Dube
