= Redsan =

Kenyan reggae and ragga artist

- Born: Swabri Mohammed; 1 May 1981 (age 45); Majengo, Nairobi, Kenya
- Occupations: Ragga and reggae artist
- Years active: 2001–present

Swabri Mohammed (born 1 May 1981), better known by his stage name Redsan, is a Kenyan reggae and ragga artist. He is one of the most renowned ragga and dancehall artists in East Africa. His popularity has extended to the rest of Africa, parts of Europe, the United States, and the Middle East.

== Beginnings ==
Mohammed was born on 1 May 1981. He was raised in the informal housing sector in Majengo in Nairobi, Kenya. His home of origin is coast and he belongs to the Mijikenda tribe of Duruma. His first album, Seasons of the San, was released in 2002 under the Ogopa Deejays label. Redsan's career propelled to higher heights with more international shows after the release of his first album. His second album Red (2004), and his third album Pioneer (2006) were also big hits.

== Career ==
His music career began when he won the Star Search challenge hosted at Carnivore discothèque in Nairobi in 1998. He released his first album 'Seasons of the San (2002)' as part of the Ogopa Djs unit. This album included hit songs "Julie" and "Wanipa Raha" which propelled him to fame in Kenya, East Africa and abroad. He then embarked on his solo career and released his second album under Southwest Records. It also included hit song "Bageya", a collaboration with Ugandan artist Jose Chameleone.

His second album Red, was released in 2004. It contained hit tracks "Chicken", "Malaika" and "Apakatwe".

His third album, Pioneer, was released in 2006 with hit singles such as "Kenyan" and "Touch". His own music is currently being produced by Monalisa. As an artist he continues to write all the songs sometimes with co-writers. He has toured in several countries around the world. Redsan has earned the nickname 'Absentee Dance hall King" in Kenyan media as he is always on tour outside the country.

In 2013, he collaborated with Jamaican artist Demarco on the remix to his hit single ' Badder Dan Most'. The single gained him a lot of airplay and broadened his musical reach. This was followed by a lucrative music deal with Pan Africa music company Rockstar4000.

=== Record Label ===
After the release of his third album, he established his studio and label, Dutty Sounds. Redsan signed former Southwest head producer Maich Blaq to head his record label. He has signed several artistes including Proff, whose debut single 'Nataka Nijue' ruled Kenyan charts for six weeks.Proff's second single, "Data" was a commercial success and topped various charts across east Africa.

=== Hit Singles ===
His hit singles include "Mikono Juu", "Chicken","unbreakable" "Malaika", "Step on it", "Apakatwe" and "Julie".

"Julie" or (a.k.a. "Julie, My Lover") is one of his most popular songs. It is a remix of an old African classic love song, "Unirudie rumi wee"/"nihurumie wangu we" (Please have mercy on me). It is both in English and Swahili. It delineates a male-female relationship where the suitor is trying to court a girl named Julie.

The song is noted for both its lyrics, message and rhythms. The song expressing a desire to a single partner in a time of sexual promiscuity due to 'disease' and due to a desire to remain faithful to the woman he wants to marry.

== Personal life ==
He married Viverz Mohammed in 2012.

He is a member of an organization that helps to eradicate poverty and create HIV/AIDS awareness in Africa.

== Discography ==
=== Albums ===
- Seasons of the San (2002)
- Red (2004)
- Pioneer (2006)
- Versatility (2009)
- The Baddest (2018)

== Awards ==
Won:

- 2005 Chaguo La Teeniez – Best Male Artiste
- 2005 Kisima Music Awards Best Reggae/Ragga

Nominated:

- 2003 Kora Awards – Most Promising African Male.
- 2004 Kora Awards – Best East African Male Artist
- 2006 Tanzania Music Awards – Best East African Album (Pioneer)
- 2006 Pearl of Africa Music Awards – Best Kenyan Male Artiste
