= Ben Mutua Jonathan Muriithi =

Kenyan journalist

Ben Mutua Jonathan Mūrììthi
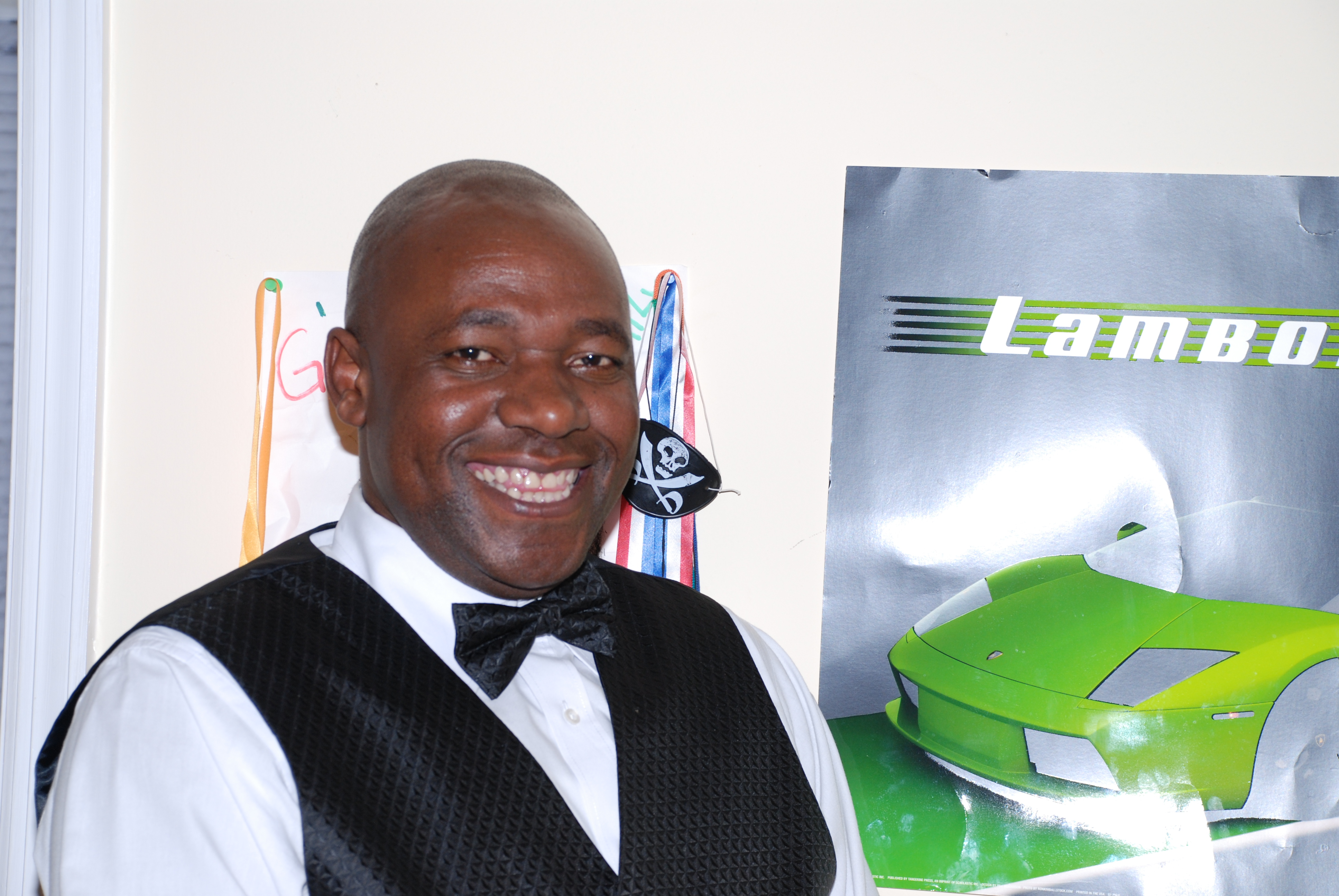
- Born: 4 May 1969 (age 57)
- Occupations: Actor, journalist
- Spouse: Edith Muriithi

BMJ (Ben Mutua Jonathan) Mūrììthi (born Jonathan Nyaga; 4 May 1969) is a Kenyan journalist, actor, and media personality known for his contributions to print, radio, and television. He works for the Voice of America Swahili branch as a journalist and broadcaster.
