= Longombas =

Kenyan music duo

Lovy and Christian Longombas were a duo from Kenya who performed a mixture of Hip hop and Soukous. Christian Longomba was diagnosed with a brain tumor in May 2015, and underwent surgery to have it removed. He later required a second surgery due to blood clots in his brain and completed six weeks of radiation therapy. He died on March 13, 2021.

== Career ==
The group consisted of two brothers, Christian and Lovy Longomba. They were from a musical family; their father Lovy Longomba Sr. was a member of Super Mazembe, while their grandfather Vicky Longomba was a member of TPOK Jazz. France-based Congolese musician Awilo Longomba is their uncle.

The group entered the Kenyan music scene in 2002 with their song "Dondosa", which became a national hit. Follow-up singles were "Piga Makofi", "Shika More" and "Vuta Pumz". Their debut album Chukua was released in 2005 by Ogopa DJs. In 2003, they left Ogopa DJs record label together with Deux Vultures and Mr. Googz & Vinnie Banton, and formed their own label, Bad Man Camp. Deux Vultures and the Longombas, however, later returned to Ogopa

They performed at the 2006 Channel O Music Video Awards in South Africa. The group later relocated from Kenya to Los Angeles.

== Awards ==
- 2005 Kora Awards Africa - Best East African Group
- 2006 Kisima Music Awards - Best Group from Kenya & Boomba Group & Best Song from Kenya ("Vuta Pumz") & Social Responsibility
- 2006 Tanzania Music Awards - Best East African Album (Chukua)

=== Nominations ===
- 2006 Pearl of Africa Music Awards - Best Group from Kenya
