= Kisima Music Awards =

Music awards in east Africa

The Kisima Music Awards were an awards program that recognised musical talent in East Africa. Despite being Kenyan-based the scheme awards artists from a variety of countries, predominantly Kenya, Uganda and Tanzania, and incorporates a range of music genres. In 2020 it became the Kisima Music and Film Awards. No awards have been held since 2020.

== History ==
Named after the Swahili word for "well", the Kisima Awards was founded by Pete Odera and Tedd Josiah in 1994. The scheme initially aimed to recognise outstanding achievement in the performing arts and associated spheres such as education and business, and was held locally at Nairobi's Braeburn Theatre with clay trophies being awarded. This process continued annually with the awards being held at the Carnivore Restaurant, however in 1997, the scheme was discontinued.

The awards were revitalised in 2003, with organisers arranging to coincide its events with the Fête de la Musique. With increased funding and support from both government and sponsors the new scheme featured updated nomination and voting processes, larger award ceremonies held at a customised Kisima Dome tent and targeted artists from across the nation. However rather than all performing arts the new awards now recognised only musical talent.

In 2004, the scheme was expanded to incorporate artists from all of East Africa, no longer restricting the talent to Kenya, and subsequently recognised musicians from Uganda and Tanzania. In 2005 Tedd Josiah stepped down as CEO of the awards amid controversy surrounding his winning of the Best Producer Award, appointing Victor Mayeya Odwori in his place.

In 2007 the event was moved to Marula Manor in Karen rather than being held at Carnivore. That year the voting deadline was extended four times.

The 2008 event was repeatedly delayed and eventually held a year later. The main sponsor, Zain, had pulled out of their deal with Kisima Holdings. It was scheduled for the 29th November 2008 at The Windsor Golf and Country Club. Artists had already been asked to perform, and had arrived in Nairobi, before being informed of the cancellation. It was held in September 2009 and referred to as the 2008/2009 Kisima Music Awards. Criticism continued as there was very little press announcing the show and in announcing the winners.

The 2011 event was held on September 30 at the Kenyatta International Convention Centre. This was the first year which included a cash prize. During a launch event, the organization said there would be 32 categories. However, when the nominees list came out only twelve categories were included. The show started hours late and included a political endorsement by the opening act and a fashion show in the middle.

The 2012 event was also at the Kenyatta International Convention Centre. It was held on November 2nd.

The awards were not held again until 2020. They were rebranded as the Kisima Music and Film Awards. Fred Simiyu, Chairman of the Nairobi-based ad agency IQ Marketing, purchased the company. The ceremony was held on December 13 at the Sarit Centre. As it was during the COVID-19 pandemic, organizers adhered to rules from the Ministry of Health. Simiyu announced plans to expand the awards to all of Africa citing the ending of the Kora Awards as a partial motivator. However, no further award ceremonies seem to have been held.

== Awards process ==
=== Categories ===
The Kisima Music Awards aim to cover a diverse range of music genres and the variety of roles within production. The categories have changed regularly since 2003, however those frequently recognised within the scheme are:

- Best artist/group performing:
  - Afro-fusion
  - Asian Music
  - Boomba Rap
  - Boomba Pop
  - Contemporary Gospel
  - Eastern Benga
  - Western Benga
  - Hip hop
  - R&B
  - Rap
  - Reggae/Ragga
  - Traditional
- Best Artist/Group from Kenya/Tanzania/Uganda nb: separate award for each country
- Best Music Video Kenya/Tanzania/Uganda nb: separate award for each country
- Best Song
- Best Album
- Best Collaboration
- Best Male Performer
- Best Female Performer
- Most Promising Performer
- Best Group
- Producer of the Year
- Most Socially Aware Artist

=== Nomination and voting ===
Artists, groups and producers are able to nominate themselves for an award or be nominated, although they must approve the latter. To be eligible for nomination artists must have worked on a song or album that has been released in the year prior to the entry.

After the cut off date for nomination all entries are screened for eligibility and categories are determined based on the field of contestants. A "nomination academy" made up of recognised members of the East African music scene then reduce each category to 4–5 finalists based on artistic flair and technical achievement, sales and chart positions are not taken into account during nomination.

The winners within each category are determined by a twofold voting system. The first is a percentage of the final score allocated to the nomination academy who individually vote for their preferred artist/group. The second is a larger percentage allocated to the general public who vote via SMS for their favourite artist after having access to various music samples on the official website. All the votes go to an independent auditing firm who determine the final winner.

=== Ceremony ===
The pinnacle of the awards process is the gala night, in which winners are announced and receive their trophies. The contestants and audience, a crowd of thousands drawn from both influential media, political and cultural personalities and paying members of the general public, are also treated to a variety of acts including musical performances, comedy routines and acrobatics. The night itself can last for up to six hours and is broadcast across Africa by satellite television Channel O.

After the gala night a winner's concert is held open to the public. Artists have also been called on to participate in tours in reflection of the social responsibility of the awards

=== Kisima Music Trust ===
The governing body behind the awards is the Kisima Music Trust. It operates as a non-profit body and aims to bring stability to the Kenyan music scene and to encourage artists to perform both domestically and internationally. The organisation derives most of its funding from sponsorship.

== Kisima Award winners ==
- 2003 Kisima Music Awards
- 2004 Kisima Music Awards
- 2005 Kisima Music Awards
- 2006 Kisima Music Awards
- 2007 Kisima Music Awards

The 2008 awards were delayed until September 2009. For the combined 2008/2009 the male artist of the year was Nameless, female was Marion Shako, and group was P-Unit.

The 2011 awards included a posthumous lifetime achievement award for Habel Kifoto. Gospel musician Juliani won artist of the year.

The 2012 winners included Nameless as top Fusion Artiste (also winner of the "Lifetime Achievement Award"), Daddy Owen as top Gospel Artiste, Avril as top Boomba Artiste, Nonini as Hip Hop Artiste, Wyre as top Ragga Reggae Artiste, Camp Mulla as Upcoming Group, P-Unit and Sauti Sol as top Collaboration, Willie Owusu for top Music Video (Color Kwa Face – Nonini), Chameleone for East African Recognition Award, and Daddy Owen / Denno as Artiste / Group of the Year. The full list of nominees is also available on the award website.

== Controversy ==
The Kisima Awards have experienced their share of controversy.

In 2004 the then CEO of the scheme Tedd Josiah received the award for Best Producer, and faced allegations of "swinging himself an award". He subsequently resigned citing a conflict of interest, and claimed he had pleaded with the judges not to allow him in the category.

Musicians and producers such as Lydia Achieng Abura have also been critical of the voting system used to decide the awards, citing that SMS was predominantly used by youth and that this combined with the ability to vote an indefinite number of times would produce a flawed representation of the popularity of an artist. They claim that voting should lie with a panel of judges.

In 2006 at least five artist refused to attend the winners concert, Beach Fusion, claiming they had not entered into a performance contract with the event organisers. These claims were refuted by the organisers, who alleged the concert was solely for charity and that contestants had been briefed prior to the events

The scheme does not award monetary prizes, although each trophy is worth Sh20,000 (about US$250).

== See also ==
- Music of Kenya
- Kenyan hip hop
