= Kenyan hip-hop =

Overview of hip hop in Kenya

Kenyan hip hop
- Stylistic origins: Hip hop; contemporary R&B; dance-pop
- Cultural origins: 1990s, Nairobi, Kenya
- Typical instruments: Drum machine; keyboards; rapping; vocals; sampler; synthesizer
- Derivative forms: Southern hip hop; West Coast hip hop; East Coast hip hop

Subgenres
- kapuka, genge, gengetone, shrap, Kenyan drill

Kenyan hip hop is a genre of music and a culture that covers various forms and sub-genres of hip hop and rap originating from Kenya. It is most commonly a combination of Swahili and English (Kenya's official languages) as well as Sheng and a variety of tribal languages.

== Development ==
As hip hop gained recognition in the global music scene in the late 1980s and early 1990s, it became increasingly common in Kenyan media. As most American rappers were of African descent, Kenyan youths felt represented and inspired, and started emulating them by wearing African American urban fashion; exchanging albums, mix tapes, hip hop magazines such as Word Up and The Source; and reciting song lyrics and rapping in English. The movement spread further when matatus painted with graffiti started playing rap music, and some Kenyan artists started releasing rap-influenced songs.

According to Alicia Rebensdorf, initially there was a strong correlation between rap music and wealth in Nairobi in the 1990s. The extremely high cost of rap CDs, magazines, merchandise, and music equipment led the genre to be initially exclusive to middle- and upper-class youths. Music videos were a primary source of exposure to the global rap/hip-hop music scene and culture. In this visual medium, the social and cultural meanings of lyrics were overshadowed by the "visual images of wealth and the verbal speed of the rappers", producing a "relatively materialistic notion of rap music and hip-hop culture".

According to the documentary Hip-Hop Colony, the beginnings of Kenyan hip hop was like a "new breed of colonialism," transplanting the original styles from the Westernized world to Africa. However, Kenya has not only embraced but also appropriated the genre, creating its own distinct version. Since its explosion in the mid-1990s, Kenyan hip hop is now generally written and performed in English, Swahili, and Sheng, a slang combination of the two.

== History ==
In 1990, the teenage singer and producer Ricky Oyaro made the initial impact on the Kenyan music scene with the hip-hop/R&B single "Renaissance", which triggered a renaissance in the then-ailing Kenyan music industry. The song received massive airplay on radio and Music Time on Kenyan television. Jimmy Gathu, one of the earliest known rappers on the Kenyan scene, would soon follow with his 1991 hit "Look, Think, Stay Alive", a song dealing with road safety. Soon after, more and more Kenyan youths started rapping on TV. The show Mizizi, which aired on the Kenya Broadcasting Corporation, gave young rappers a platform to express themselves, giving rise to Kenyan hip hop.

The first major commercial hip hop hit emerged in 1996 with "Uhiki" by Hardstone (Harrison Ngunjiri), which sampled a Kikuyu folk song and Marvin Gaye's "Sexual Healing", and was produced by Tedd Josiah of Audio Vault Studios (now Blue Zebra). Other popular pioneering acts were Kalamashaka with their national hit "Tafsiri Hii", K-South with "Nyabaga Kodo Gakwa" (which was also sampled from a Kikuyu folk song), and Poxi Presha with his breakout hit "Dhako Kelo".

Gidi Gidi Maji Maji became well-known in 1999 for their song "Ting Badi Malo", and released their debut album Ismarwa the following year. They went on to release their popular and politically charged hit "Unbwogable" in 2002; the word took on the meaning of "unshakable", "unstoppable", or "unbeatable" and was subsequently used by major politicians and in reference to 2008 US presidential candidate Barack Obama.

In 2006, Ukoo Flani Mau Mau was awarded Best Song (Hip Hop) at the 2006 Kisima Music Awards for "Punchlines Kibao", featuring Vigeti (Kalamashaka, Kimya, and Ibra da Hustla (Nako 2 Nako)). The song was produced by Musyoka and recorded at Andaki Studios, deep in the heart of Dandora, Kenya's home of hip hop.

== Awards ==
The first all-Kenyan hip hop awards ceremony, the UnKut Africa Hip Hop Awards, was held virtually in 2018 and in-person in December 2019 with over 10,000 votes cast. The event was hosted by UnKut Africa, an entertainment organization founded by Ruby V.
