= Poxi Presha =

Poxi Presha (1971–2005), real name Prechard Pouka Olang, was a pioneer Kenyan rapper. He emerged in the mid 1990s with hip hop sung in Dholuo language. His debut album Total Balaa also popularly known as "Dhako" was released late 1997, then followed by hits like "Mummy","Jaluo Jeuri" which featured celebrated actor Joseph Olita of 'Rise & Fall of Idi Amin' and "Otonglo Time". The album was followed by another solo album Vita Kwaliti.

He was also an MC for Nairobi City Ensemble group, which released the album "Kaboum Boum", containing a remake of "Lunchtime", originally popular song by benga singer Gabriel Omolo.

He was known as the "bad boy of Kenyan music" due to number of incidents, such as falling out with his producers Bruce Odhiambo and Tedd Josiah. He also released dis track "Wape Really?" aimed at producers and promoters.

During his later years, Poxi Presha worked as an anti-piracy activist.

Poxi Presha was born in Mombasa but was based in Nairobi during his career. He died at the St Mary's Hospital in Langata, Nairobi on October 14, 2005 due to tuberculosis, aged 34.

== Discography ==
- Otonglo Time
- Dhako
- Wape really
- Picha Yanje
- Taxi driver
- Mummy
- Lunch Time
- Jowa
- Jaber
- In Kenya (remix
