= Kleptomaniax =

Kenyan musical group

- Origin: Nairobi, Kenya
- Genres: Kenyan hip hop, Afro pop, rap, pop Genge
- Occupations: Rapper, vocalist, record producer, DJ, songwriter
- Years active: 1999–present
- Label: Ogopa Deejays
- Past members: Roba; Nyashinski; Collo

Kleptomaniax is a rap group from Nairobi, Kenya. The group consists of three members: Roba (Robert Manyasa), Collo (Collins Majale) and Nyashinski (Nyamari Ongegu).

Kleptomaniax was formed in 1999, when they were still high school students at the Nairobi School. The group joined the Ogopa DJs label and released their first single, "Freak It" in 2002, which was followed by "Maniax Anthem" and "Haree." In 2004 the group released another single "Tuendelee", which became their biggest hit so far. The song was written as a response for the "Diss track" by various hip hop musicians (including Bamboo), who criticised the commercial Kapuka music style performed by Kleptomaniax among others.

Their debut album M4E (an abbreviation for Maniax Forever) was released in 2005. Later that year the group received an MTV Europe Music Awards nomination for the Best African Act, a category awarded for the first time, but won by Nigerian recording artist 2Face Idibia. In 2007 Kleptomaniax toured the US. The group was managed by Fakii Liwali.

After 2007, the group took a hiatus while its members pursued solo projects. The group has since made a comeback but has left Ogopa DJs. The group released their second album NITT (Now Is The Time) in 2009. The group was believed to have disbanded after the release of their second album to pursue solo careers.

Influential group member Nyashinski made a successful comeback in 2016 and his song 'Malaika' scooped a Mdundo Award for Most Downloaded Male Single in 2017

Collo remained on the scene as a solo act and has since transitioned to a gospel artist.

== Awards ==
- 2002 Chat Awards - Favourite Male Group
- 2003 Chat Awards - Favourite Male Group
- 2005 Kisima Music Awards - Best Group

=== Nominations ===
- 2005 MTV Europe Music Awards - Best African Act
- 2005 Kora Awards - Best Group from Eastern Africa
- 2006 Tanzania Music Awards - Best East African Album ("M4E")
- 2008 Kisima Music Awards - Video of the Year ("Magnetic")
- 2008 Pearl of Africa Music Awards - Best Kenyan Group
