= Nameless (musician) =

Kenyan musician (born 1976)

- Born: David Mathenge; 1 August 1976 (age 50); Nairobi, Kenya
- Genre: Afropop
- Occupations: Musician, songwriter
- Instruments: Keyboard, sampler, guitar
- Years active: 1999–present

David Mathenge (born 1 August 1976), better known by his stage name Nameless, is a Kenyan pop artist.

== Music career and education ==
Nameless, through his musical talents, has helped many artists in the country gain global recognition and collaborate with other African artists. He rose to fame in 1999 after winning a star-search contest on Kenya's urban music station, Capital F.M, with his original song Megarider. He graduated from the University of Nairobi with a degree in architecture.

== Personal life ==
In 2005, he married Wahu Kagwi, who is also a musician, and together they have 3 daughters.

== Awards ==
=== Won ===
- 2004 Kisima Music Awards – Best Boomba Pop Artist
- 2006 Kisima Music Awards – Best Male Artist, Best Afro Fusion & Best Music Video (Sinzia).
- 2006 Pearl of Africa Music Awards (PAM Awards) – Best Male (Kenya)
- 2007 Tanzania Music Awards – Best East African Single (Sinzia).
- 2007 Channel O Music Video Awards – Best Male Video (“Sinzia”)
- 2008 Pearl of Africa Music Awards – Best Kenyan Male Artist
- 2008 Kisima Music Awards – Male Artist of the Year & Best Video ("Salari")
- 2009 Tanzania Music Awards – Best East African Single ("Salari")
- 2009 MTV Africa Music Awards – Best Male & Listener's Choice

=== Nominations ===
- 2004 Kora Awards – Best African Group (Nameless & Mr. Lenny)
- 2005 Tanzania Music Awards – Best East African Album ("On Fire")
- 2006 MTV Europe Music Awards 2006 – Best African Act
- 2006 Channel O Music Video Awards – Best East African video ("Juju" featuring Mr. Lenny)
- 2009 MTV Africa Music Awards – Best Performer
