= Carnivore (restaurant) =

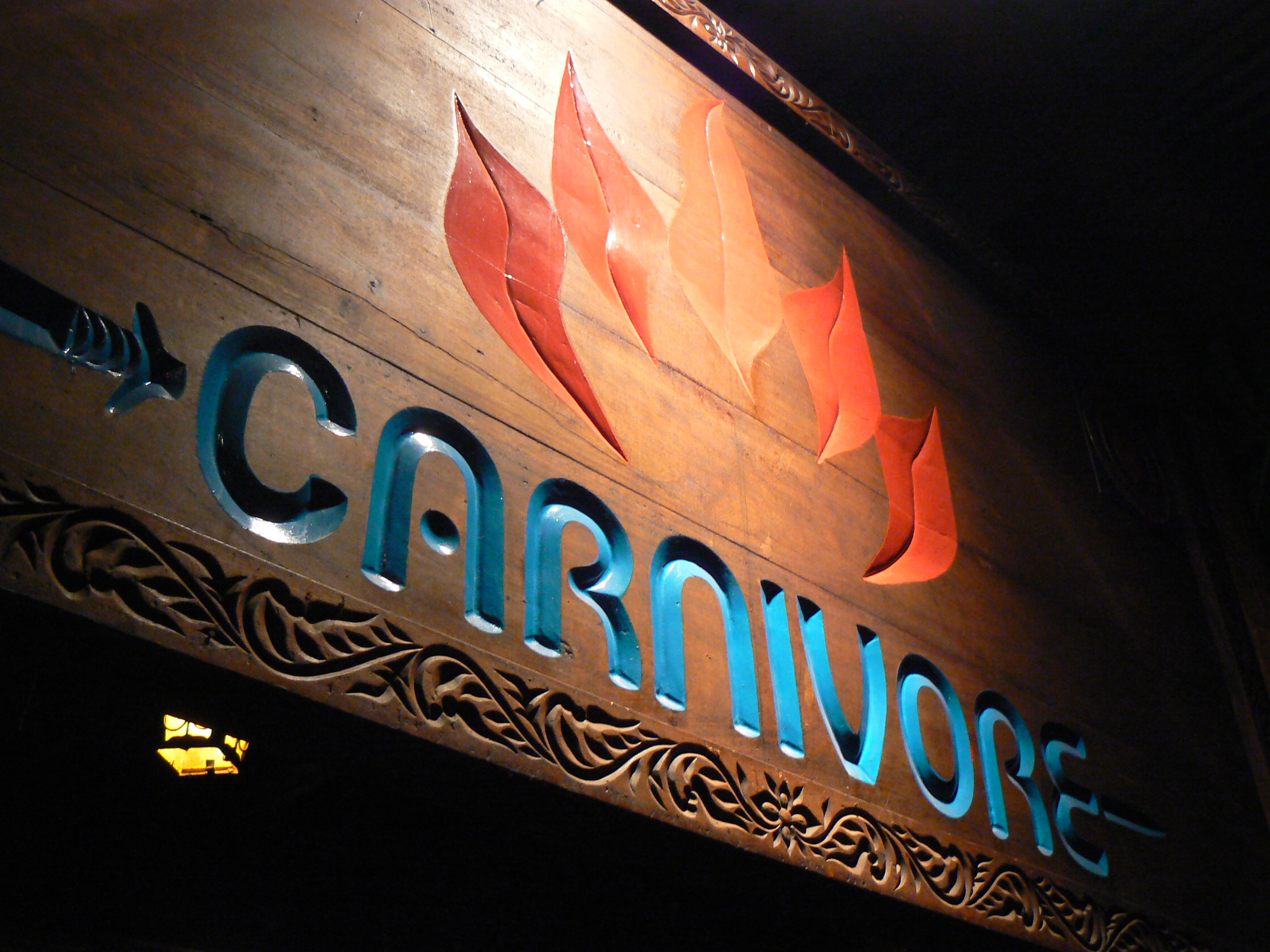
- Interactive map of Carnivore

Restaurant information
- Established: 1980
- Owner: Tamarind Group
- Location: Langata Rd, Langata, Nairobi, Kenya
- Coordinates: 1.329000°S 36.8005000°E
- Seating capacity: 350
- Website: tamarind.co.ke/carnivore

Carnivore is an open-air restaurant in the Langata suburb of Nairobi, Kenya. Carnivore's specialty is meat, and features an all-you-can-eat meat buffet. They serve a wide variety of meat and were famous for their game meat until Kenya imposed a ban on the sale of game meat in 2004. It remains a popular tourist destination.

== History ==
In 1999, the restaurant seated 350 people and the restaurant's 330 employees served over 1000 people per day. The game, including giraffe, wildebeest, ostrich and crocodile, was raised on Hopcraft Ranch, 40 kilometres (25 mi) outside Nairobi. Since the sale of wild game meat was banned in Kenya in 2004, the restaurant serves meat of domestic animals such as beef, pork, lamb, and chicken, as well as farmed ostrich and crocodile meat. The meat is skewered on Maasai swords, cooked on coals, and served on cast-iron plates. It does have a vegetarian option. It ranked 47th on Restaurant magazine's "World's Best 50 Restaurants" list in 2003.

== Simba Saloon ==
There is also a "Simba Saloon" night club on the premises with a capacity of 2,500, as well as an internet cafe, playground, and six bars. The restaurant holds concerts featuring local artists. International artists such as Shaggy, Tevin Campbell, T.O.K., and Sean Paul have also performed there. Three people died in a stampede at the saloon in 2004. The restaurant is famous for themed nights that incorporate old skul, rock and soul nights to the merriment of many Kenyans.

== Tamarind Group ==
Carnivore is owned by Martin Dunford of the Tamarind Group. It was opened in 1980 by Dunford, his wife, and a group of partners. Dunford opened Carnivore, inspired by the Rodízio concept of Brazilian churrascaria steak houses. The Tamarind Group operates Tamarind seafood restaurants in Mombasa and Nairobi. There are also similar restaurants named Carnivore, owned by the same people, on the outskirts of Johannesburg, South Africa, and in Cairo, Egypt.

== Gallery ==
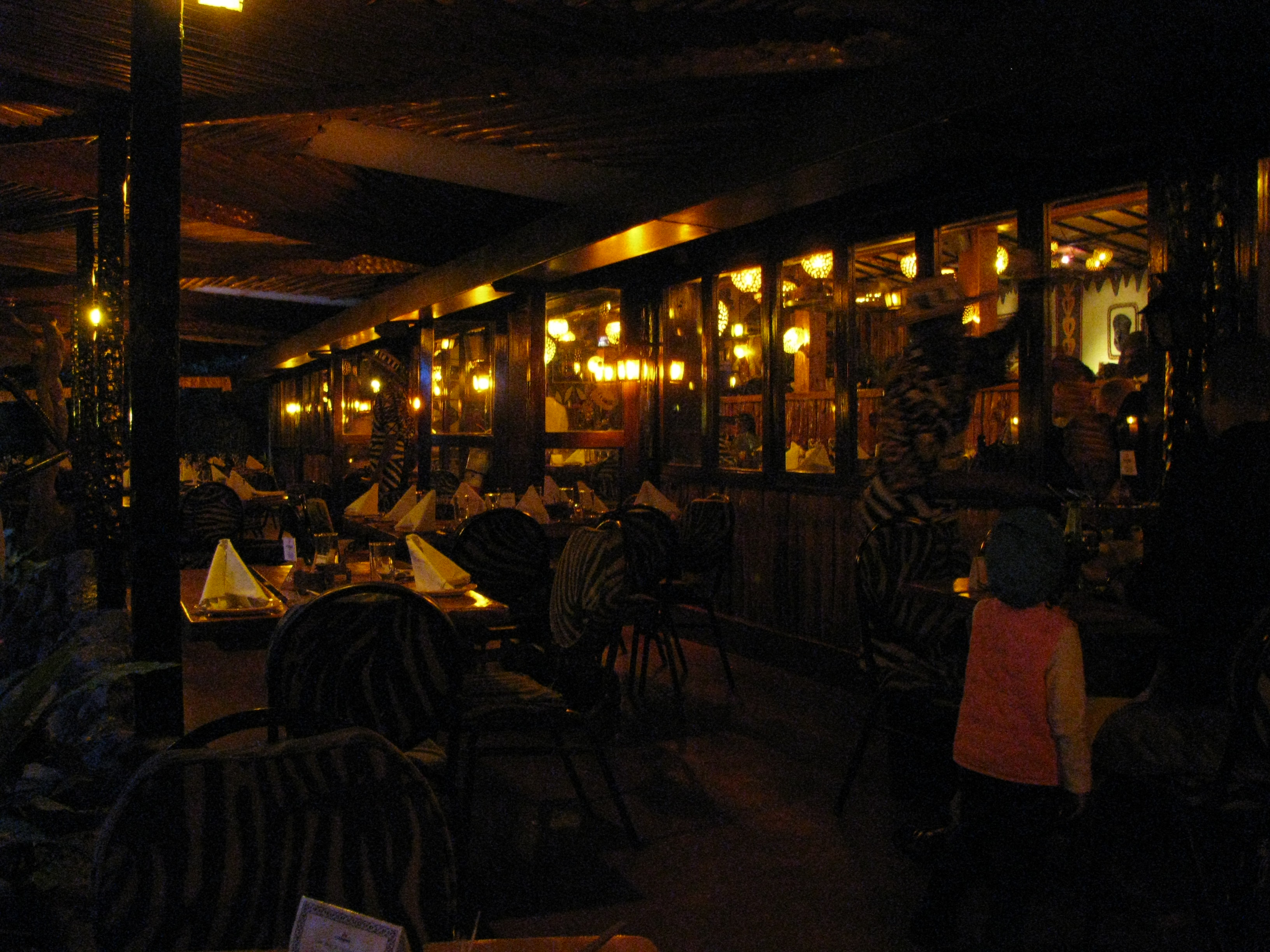
Inside the Carnivore

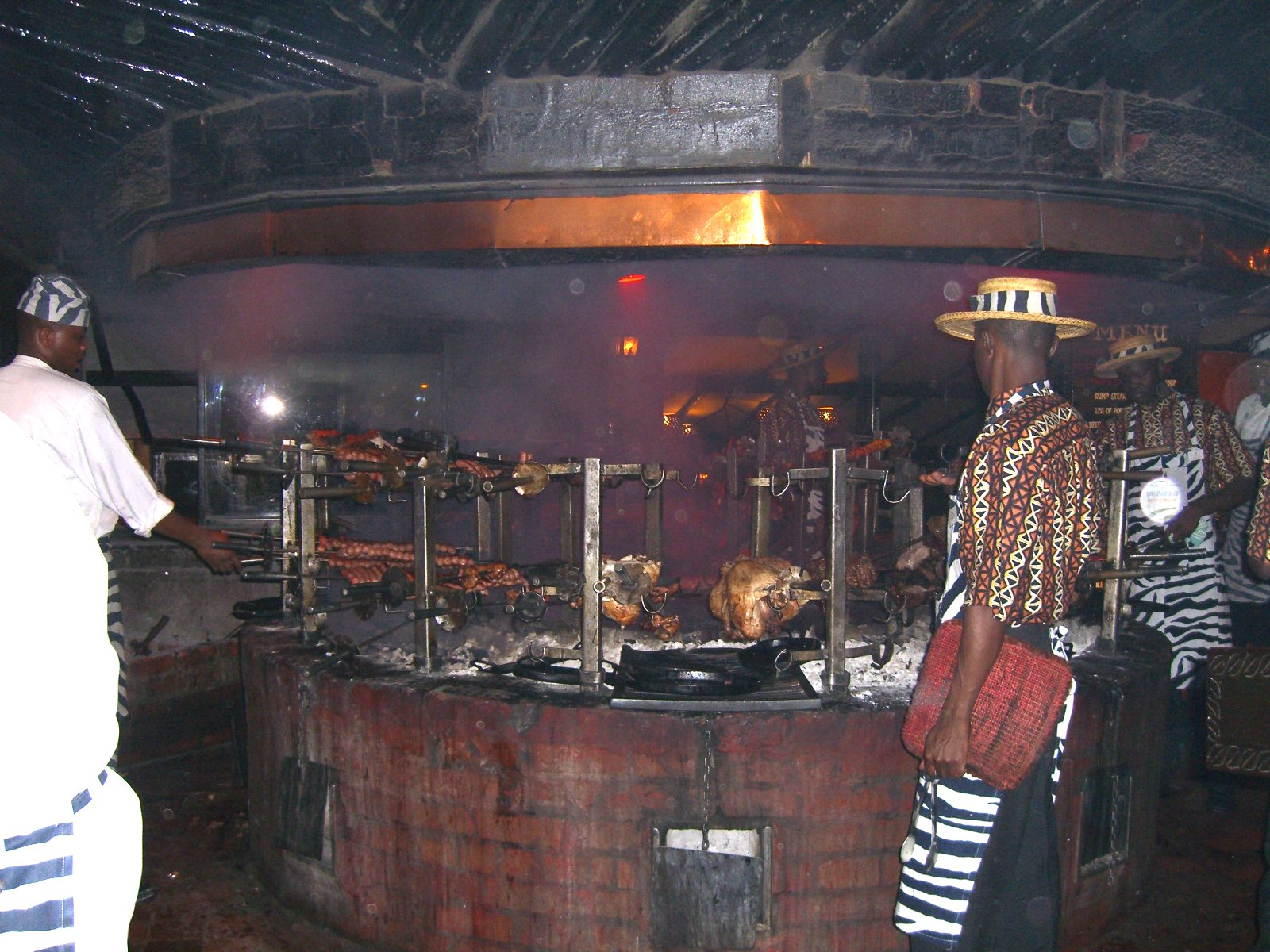
Meat roasting at Carnivore

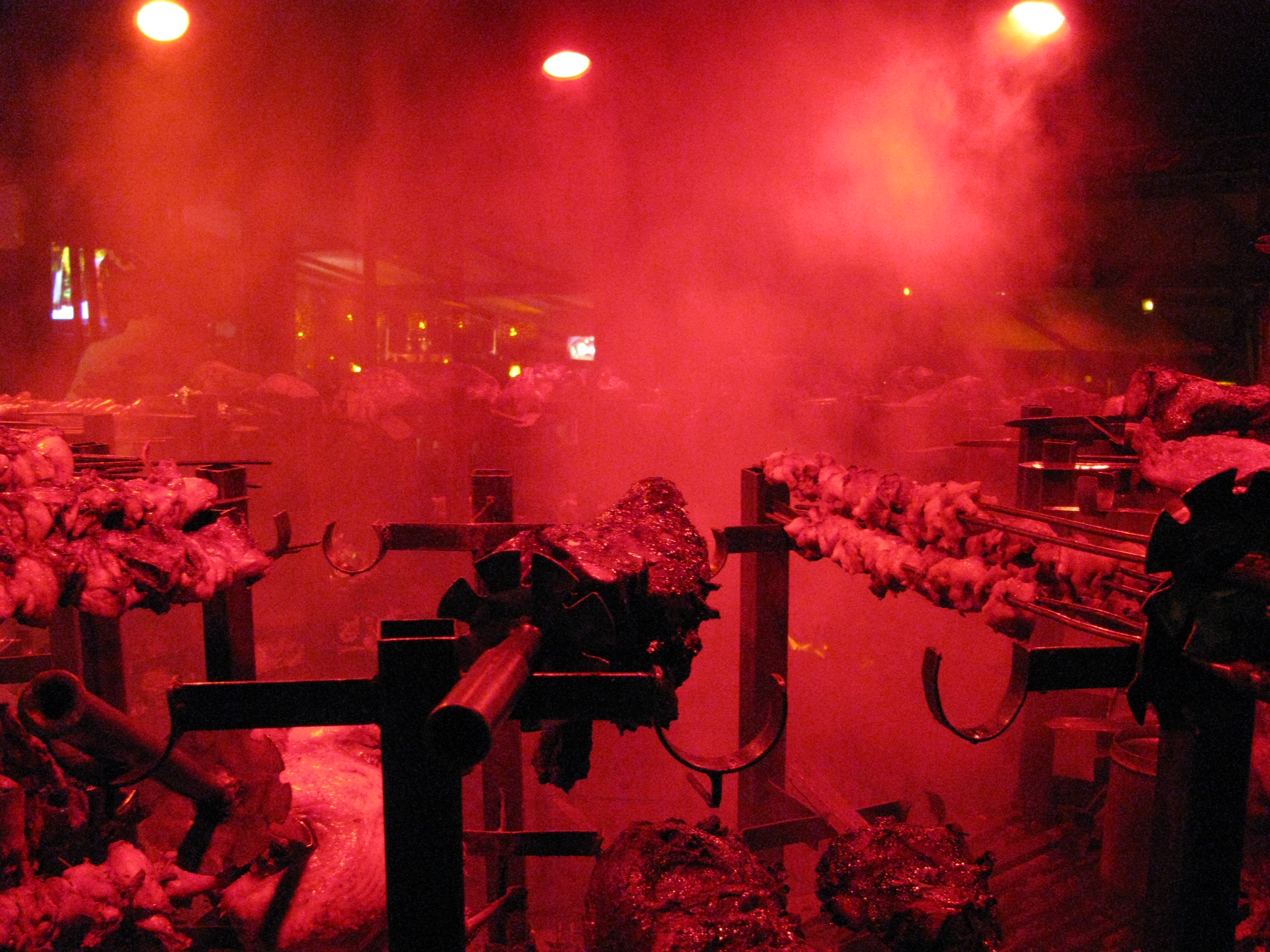
Carnivore charcoal pit
