= List of awards and nominations received by Sauti Sol =

Sauti Sol awards and nominations
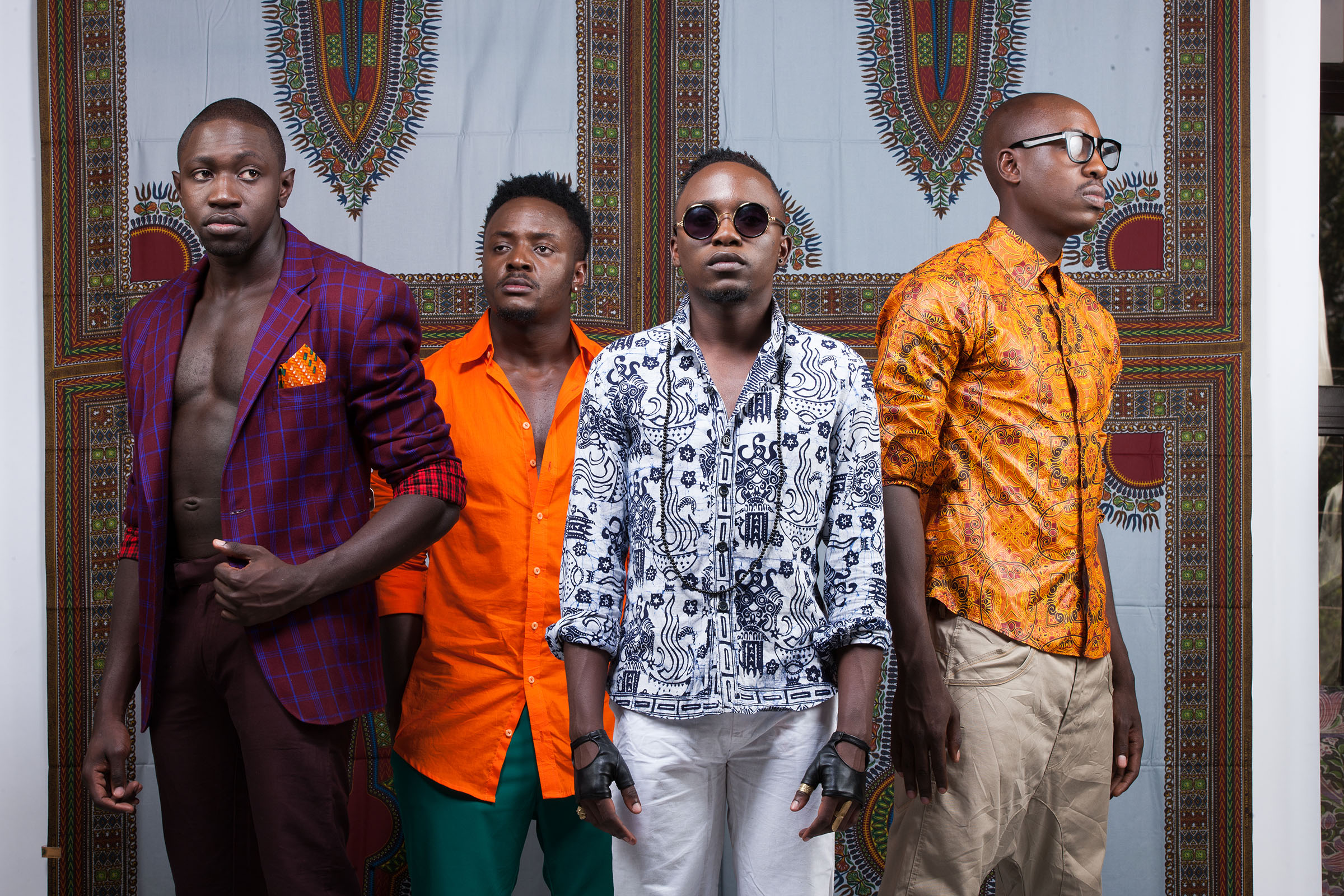
Awards and nominations
Award	Wins	Nominations
All Africa Music Awards	2	4
BET Awards	0	1
Channel O Music Video Awards	1	3
HiPipo Music Awards	0	2
Kisima Music Awards	2	0
MTV Africa Music Awards	0	3
MTV Europe Music Awards	1	1
Nigeria Entertainment Awards	0	1

Totals (Note: Certain award groups do not simply award one winner. They acknowledge several different recipients, have runners-up, and have third place. Since this is a specific recognition and is different from losing an award, runner-up mentions are considered wins in this award tally. For simplification and to avoid errors, each award in this list has been presumed to have had a prior nomination.)
- Wins: 26
- Nominations: 41 (Note: Awards in certain categories do not have prior nominations and only winners are announced by a panel or jury. For simplification and to avoid errors, each award in this list has been presumed to have had a prior nomination.)

The following article outlines the awards and nominations received by Kenyan afro-pop band Sauti Sol. Formed in 2005, the band has since grown to become one of the most successful musical acts in Africa, gaining considerable attention, praise and recognition for their work.

While neither their debut studio album Mwanzo nor any of its songs were nominated for any awards, the group received a nomination for Best African Newcomer at the 2010 African Music Awards. They received their first major accolade the same year, winning Best Group at the Museke Online Africa Music Awards. In 2011, Sauti Sol was named Best Fusion Artist/Group of the Year at the Kisima Music Awards, while the music video for the song "Coming Home" from their second studio album Sol Filosofia won Best Music Video. The following 3 years saw them pick up a further 6 awards, most notably winning Best African Act at the 2014 MTV Europe Music Awards, becoming the first Kenyan musicians to receive the award.

In 2015, the release of their third studio album Live and Die in Afrika saw the group receive continued recognition. The song "Sura Yako" was nominated for 9 awards, winning Most Downloaded Single, Most Downloaded Afro-Pop Single and Most Downloaded Song at the Mdundo Music Awards, while its music video won YouTube Video of the Year at the Pulse Music Video Awards. The song "Nerea", featuring the duo Amos and Josh, also received numerous nominations, winning Best Collaboration of the Year at the Pulse Music Video Awards. The group was also nominated for Best International Act: Africa at the BET Awards, but lost out to Ghanaian musician Stonebwoy.

== Abryanz Style and Fashion Awards ==
Year	Nominated work	Award	Result	Ref
2015	Sauti Sol	East Africa's Most Stylish Male Artiste	Won	
2016	Sauti Sol	East Africa's Most Stylish Male Artiste	Nominated	
2016	"Tulale Fofofo"	Africa's Most Fashionable Music Video	Nominated	
2017	Sauti Sol	Most Stylish Male Artiste - Africa	Won	
2018	Sauti Sol	Most Stylish Male Artiste - Africa	Nominated	
2018	Sauti Sol	Fahionable Music Video of the Year - Africa	Nominated	

== African Entertainment Awards ==
Year	Nominated work	Award	Result	Ref
2015	Sauti Sol	Hottest Group	Won	
2016	Sauti Sol	Hottest Group	Nominated	
2018	Sauti Sol	Hottest Group	Won	

== African Music Awards ==
Year	Nominated work	Award	Result	Ref
2010	Sauti Sol	Best African Newcomer	Nominated	
2018	Sauti Sol	Best International Artist	Nominated	

== African Muzik Magazine Awards ==
Year	Nominated work	Award	Result	Ref
2014	Sauti Sol	Best African Group	Nominated	
2015	Sauti Sol	Best African Group	Won	
2015	Sauti Sol	Best Dance in a Video	Nominated	
2015	"Sura Yako"	Song of the Year	Nominated	
2016	Sauti Sol	Best Male East Africa	Nominated	
2016	Sauti Sol	Best African Group	Won	
2016	Sauti Sol	Artist of the Year	Nominated	
2016	"Unconditionally Bae" (featuring Ali Kiba)	Video of the Year	Nominated	
2016	"Unconditionally Bae" (featuring Ali Kiba)	Song of the Year	Nominated	
2017	Sauti Sol	Best African Group	Nominated	
2017	Sauti Sol	Best Male East Africa	Nominated	
2017	"Love Again"	Video of the Year	Nominated	
2017	"Love Again"	Best Collaboration	Nominated	
2018	Sauti Sol	Best Live Act	Nominated	
2018	Sauti Sol	Sauti Sol	Best Group	Nominated
2018	Sauti Sol	Best Male East Africa	Nominated	

== All Africa Music Awards ==
The All Africa Music Awards (AFRIMA), in conjunction with the African Union Commission (AUC), are designed to promote African music worldwide.

Year	Nominated work	Award	Result	Ref
2015	"Nerea" (featuring Amos and Josh)	Best African Collaboration	Nominated	
2015	Sauti Sol	Best African Group	Won	
2015	Sauti Sol	Songwriter of the Year	Nominated	
2015	Savara Mudigi, Polycarp Otieno	Producer of the Year	Won	
2018	Sauti Sol	Best African Group	Nominated	
2018	Sauti Sol	Best African Group in African Reggae/Ragga Dancehall	Nominated	
2018	"Melanin" (featuring Patoranking)	Song of the Year	Nominated	
2018	"Melanin" (featuring Patoranking)	Best Collaboration	Nominated	
2019	Afrikan Sauce	Album of the Year in Africa	Won	
2019	Sauti Sol	Best African Duo, Group or Band	Won	

== BEFFTA Awards ==
Year	Nominated work	Award	Result	Ref
2014	Sauti Sol	Best International African Act	Nominated	

== BET Awards ==
The BET Awards were established in 2001 by the Black Entertainment Television network to celebrate African Americans and other minorities in music, acting, sports, and other fields of entertainment over the past year.

Year	Nominated work	Award	Result	Ref
2015	Sauti Sol	Best International Act: Africa	Nominated	

== Bingwa Music Awards ==
Year	Nominated work	Award	Result	Ref
2014	"Sura Yako"	Best Music Video in Kenya	Won	
2015	Sauti Sol	Artist of the Year (Kenya)	Nominated	
2015	Sauti Sol	East African Artist of the Year	Won	
2015	"Nerea" (featuring Amos and Josh)	Best Video of the Year (East Africa)	Nominated	
2015	"Nerea" (featuring Amos and Josh)	Song of the Year	Nominated	
2015	"Nerea" (featuring Amos and Josh)	East African Song of the Year	Nominated	
2015	"Nerea" (featuring Amos and Josh)	Songwriter of the Year	Nominated	

== Chaguo La Teeniez Awards ==
Year	Nominated work	Award	Result	Ref
2011	Sauti Sol	Teeniez' Group or Collabo	Nominated	
2012	"Gentleman" (featuring P-Unit)	Teeniez' Group or Collabo	Nominated	

== Channel O Music Video Awards ==
The Channel O Music Video Awards are a pan-African awards ceremony organised annually by South African television network Channel O.

Year	Nominated work	Award	Result	Ref
2012	"I Don't Want to Be Alone" (A.Y. featuring Sauti Sol)	Most Gifted East African Video	Won	
2013	"Money Lover"	Most Gifted East African	Nominated	
2013	"Money Lover"	Most Gifted Afro-pop	Nominated	
2014	"Nishike (Touch Me)"	Most Gifted East African	Nominated	

== East Africa TV Awards ==
Year	Nominated work	Award	Result	Ref
2016	Sauti Sol	Best Group (Kundi Bora)	Nominated	

== Google Recognition ==
Year	Nominated work	Award	Result	Ref
2014	"Nishike (Touch Me)"	Most Watched Music Video on YouTube in Kenya	Won	

== HiPipo Music Awards ==
The HiPipo Music Awards (HMA) celebrates and promotes music, musicians, and artistic excellence in Uganda, with special categories for the rest of Africa.

Year	Nominated work	Award	Result	Ref
2016	Sura Yako	East Africa Super Hit	Nominated	
2016	Shake Yo Bam Bam	East Africa Best Video	Nominated	
2017	"Unconditionally Bae" (featuring Ali Kiba)	East Africa Super Hit	Won	
2017	"Unconditionally Bae" (featuring Ali Kiba)	Song of the Year - Kenya	Won	

== The Headies Awards ==
The Headies, formerly known as the Hip Hop World Awards, are an accolade established in 2006 by the Hip Hop World Magazine of Nigeria to recognize outstanding achievement in the Nigerian music industry. The annual ceremony features performances by established and promising artists.

Year	Nominated work	Award	Result	Ref
2016	Sauti Sol	African Artiste	Nominated	

== International Achievement Recognition Awards ==
Year	Nominated work	Award	Result	Ref
2018	Sauti Sol	Best African Music Artist	Nominated	

== Kilimanjaro Tanzania Music Awards ==
Year	Nominated work	Award	Result	Ref
2015	"Sura Yako"	Best Song East Africa	Won	

== Kisima Music Awards ==
The Kisima Music Awards are held annually and recognise musical talent in East Africa (predominantly Kenya, Uganda and Tanzania).

Year	Nominated work	Award	Result	Ref
2011	"Coming Home"	Best Music Video	Won	
2011	Sauti Sol	Best Fusion Artist/Group of the Year	Won	

== Kora Awards ==
The Kora Awards are held annually to recognise outstanding musical achievement in sub-Saharan Africa.

Year	Nominated work	Award	Result	Ref
2016	Sauti Sol	Best African Group	Nominated	

== Mdundo Music Awards ==
Year	Nominated work	Award	Result	Ref
2015	Sauti Sol	Most Downloaded Group	Won	
2015	"Sura Yako"	Most Downloaded Single	Won	
2015	"Sura Yako"	Most Downloaded Afro Pop Single	Won	
2015	"Sura Yako"	Most Downladed Song	Won	
2017	"Live and Die in Afrika"	Most Downloaded Group Single	Nominated	
2017	"Live and Die in Afrika"	Most Downloaded Song of the Year	Nominated	
2017	Sauti Sol	Most Downloaded Afro Pop Artists	Nominated	

== MTV Awards ==
=== MTV Africa Music Awards ===
The MTV Africa Music Awards are an annual award ceremony that celebrate and honour the most popular contemporary music in Africa.

Year	Nominated work	Award	Result	Ref
2014	Sauti Sol	Best Group	Nominated	
2015	Sauti Sol	Best Group	Nominated	
2015	"Sura Yako"	Best Song	Nominated	
2016	Sauti Sol	Best Group	Won	
2016	"Unconditionally Bae" (featuring Ali Kiba)	Best Collabo	Nominated	
2016	"Unconditionally Bae" (featuring Ali Kiba)	Song of the Year	Nominated	
2016	Sauti Sol	Artist of the Year	Nominated	

=== MTV Europe Music Awards ===
The MTV Europe Music Awards are an annual award ceremony that celebrate and honour the most popular contemporary music in Europe.

Year	Nominated work	Award	Result	Ref
2014	Sauti Sol	Best African Act	Won	
2014	Sauti Sol	Best Worldwide Act	Nominated	

== Museke Online Africa Music Awards ==
Year	Nominated work	Award	Result	Ref
2010	Sauti Sol	Best Group	Won	

== Nigeria Entertainment Awards ==
The Nigeria Entertainment Awards are an annual event focused on recognizing the contributions of Nigerian (and other African) entertainers to the entertainment industry.

Year	Nominated work	Award	Result	Ref
2015	Sauti Sol	African Artist of the Year (non-Nigerian)	Nominated	
2016	Sauti Sol	African Artist of the Year (non-Nigerian)	Nominated	
2017	Sauti Sol	Best Male Artist - Africa (non-Nigerian)	Nominated	

== OLX Social Media Awards ==
Year	Nominated work	Award	Result	Ref
2013	Sauti Sol	Artist of the Year	Won	
2014	Sauti Sol	Best Use of Social Media	Won	
2015	Sauti Sol	YouTube Channel Award	Won	
2015	Sauti Sol	Instagram Personality Award	Won	
2016	Sauti Sol	Most Social Entertainment Personality Award	Nominated	

== Pulse Music Video Awards ==
Year	Nominated work	Award	Result	Ref
2015	"Nerea" (featuring Amos and Josh)	Best Collaboration of the Year	Won	
2015	"Nerea" (featuring Amos and Josh)	Best Cinematography of the Year (Note: Enos Olik, the director of the music video for "Nerea", was also included in the nomination.)	Nominated	
2015	"Nishike"	Best Group Video of the Year	Nominated	
2015	"Shake Yo Bam Bam"	Best Choreography of the Year	Nominated	
2015	"Sura Yako"	YouTube Video of the Year	Won	
2018	Short N Sweet ft Nyashinski	Best Collaboration	Won	

== Soundcity MVP Awards Festival ==
The Soundcity MVP Awards Festival is an event presented by Soundcity TV which awards plaques to musicians and performers across Africa.

Year	Nominated work	Award	Result	Ref
2016	Sauti Sol	Best Group	Won	
2017	Sauti Sol	Best Group	Nominated	
2017	Sauti Sol	Best Collabo	Nominated	
2018	Short N Sweet ft Nyashinski	Song of the Year	Won	
2018	Sauti Sol	Best Group	Won	
2018	Short N Sweet ft Nyashinski	Video of the Year	Won	

== tooXclusive Awards ==
Year	Nominated work	Award	Result	Ref
2015	Sauti Sol	African Artiste of the Year	Nominated	

== Uganda Entertainment Awards ==
Year	Nominated work	Award	Result	Ref
2016	Sauti Sol	Best East African Act	Nominated	
