= Midnight Train (album) =

- Standard cover

Studio album by Sauti Sol
- Released: June 5, 2020
- Genre: Afropop
- Length: 45:00
- Languages: English; Swahili; Luhya
- Label: Universal Music Africa
- Producers: Sauti Sol; Andre Harris; Mboks; Kaysha; Kagwe Mungai; DTX; Sho Madjozi; Black Motion

Sauti Sol chronology
Afrikan Sauce (2019)	Midnight Train (2020)

Singles from Midnight Train
- 1. "Suzanna" Released: February 7, 2020; 2. "Disco Matanga (Yambakhana)" Released: February 28, 2020; 3. "Brighter Days" Released: April 17, 2020; 4. "Insecure" Released: May 22, 2020

Midnight Train is the fifth studio album by Kenyan Afropop band Sauti Sol. It was released by Universal Music Africa on June 5, 2020. Recorded in English, Swahili, and Luhya, the album comprises 13 tracks and is the band's first project released under the label. Sauti Sol dedicated the album to their fans and described it as a collaborative project with songwriters and producers. Midnight Train features collaborations with India Arie, Soweto Gospel Choir, Sho Madjozi, and Black Motion, among others. It explores themes of sobriety, personal insecurities, love, and hope.

The album was supported by the previously released singles "Suzanna", "Disco Matanga (Yambakhana)", "Brighter Days", and "Insecure". Midnight Train received positive critical acclaim upon release; critics characterized it as a "musical journey" and considered it to be the band's magnum opus.

== Background and recording ==
In January 2020, Sauti Sol announced on Twitter that they had signed a record deal with Universal Music Africa, a subsidiary of Universal Music Group. They also stated they were gearing up to release Midnight Train. In an interview with OkayAfrica, Chimano said their record deal with Universal took a long time because they were looking for a tailor-made deal and not just the normal artist contract. Midnight Train comprises 13 tracks and features collaborations with India Arie, Soweto Gospel Choir, Sho Madjozi, Black Motion, Mortimer, Bensoul, Nviiri the Storyteller, Okello Max, Xeniah Manasseh, and Nairobi Horns Project.

The album was initially scheduled for release in March, but its release date was pushed back three times due to the COVID-19 pandemic. Otieno told OkayAfrica that their personal experiences and what they go through as men and husbands inspired the album's music. He also said the songs on the album are relatable and have deeper messages. Chimano characterized the album as a collaborative project with songwriters and producers and said it encompasses the best of them. Moreover, the band dedicated the entire project to their fans who have stuck with them. On the album's cover art, Sauti Sol embraced innovative fashion and style.

Midnight Train was recorded between Los Angeles, Johannesburg, and Nairobi. In an interview with the website Music in Africa, Chimano said that nearly half of the album's songs were written three years prior and were recorded for a different project. He also said they recorded 20 songs for the album but chose to use only 13. The India Arie-assisted track "My Everything" was recorded in January 2020, during the 62nd Annual Grammy Awards period. Chimano revealed that they met Arie at an airport in Atlanta prior to recording the song with her and that she has always been one of their biggest musical inspirations. The album's title track, "Midnight Train", was recorded in two versions. The first version, an Afrobeats-inspired track, was released on Apple Music and Spotify; the second version was made available in 2020.

== Release and promotion ==
On August 22, 2020, Sauti Sol launched a virtual concert to promote the album. Called the Midnight Train Virtual Experience, the concert was livestreamed to over 95,000 viewers across various social media platforms. It became the most-viewed YouTube premiere by a local Kenyan artist, breaking the record previously held by Nyashinski's virtual album launch in May 2020. The concert featured additional performances from Bensoul, Nviiri the Storyteller, Okello Max, Lisah Oduor-Noah, and Xeniah Manasseh. Prior to launching the concert, Sauti Sol announced a series of interactive activities, including Sol Family, a reality television show that highlights their family life and music-making process. Additionally, the band created personalized acoustic versions of well-known album singles and shared their individual life stories on the Engage Talks Series platform.

The album's lead single, "Suzanna", was released on February 7, 2020, along with its music video. In an interview with the Citizen TV news channel that same day, Sauti Sol revealed that the song was written by Bienaimé Baraza three years prior. Some conservative groups in Kenya claimed that the song promotes incest; however, the Kenya Film Classification Board investigated the claim and debunked it. The accompanying music video for "Suzanna" was recorded and directed by Leke Alabi-Isama; it pays homage to the disco ball style of the 1970s. In the video, all of the band's members are seen dressed in bell-bottom suits, platforms, and afros. On September 25, 2020, Sauti Sol performed a live version of the song for Channel O. The album's second single, "Disco Matanga (Yambakhana)", was released on February 28, 2020. The song features guest vocals by Sho Madjozi and Black Motion; it first appeared on Netflix's Queen Sono soundtrack. In March 2020, Sauti Sol performed the song with Sho Madjozi on SABC's The Expresso Morning Show.

On April 17, 2020, the album's third single, "Brighter Days", and its accompanying music video were released at the same time. The song was written and produced by Sauti Sol and features vocals by the Soweto Gospel Choir. Moreover, it was co-produced by Mboks and mastered by Michael Manitshana. The video was recorded by Ofentse Mwase and filmed at Downtown Music Hub, a studio located in Johannesburg. The album's fourth single, "Insecure", was released on May 22, 2020, along with its music video. Otieno said their casual conversations between recording sessions and filming inspired the song. "Insecure" was released exclusively to radio stations owned by the Radio Africa Group. The accompanying music video for the song was directed by Director K, who shot it at a classic vinyl record store in Cape Town. The video thematically illustrates a lover's attempt to learn their partner's deepest emotions.

== Music and lyrics ==
Recorded in English, Swahili, and Luhya, Midnight Train explores themes of sobriety, personal insecurities, love, and hope. Its lyrics deal with enjoying life's journey and accepting its challenges and trials. The album's title track, "Midnight Train", was produced by Andre Harris; it is a mid-tempo record that samples Toto's 1982 hit "Africa". Writing for Chalked Up Reviews, Brice Boorman commended the song for "having a flow and sound that is varied and energetic." The melodic track "Insecure" is composed of rhythmic guitar strums; the song advises listeners to confront their insecurities head-on rather than try to hide them. The romantic song "Feel My Love" portrays a relationship that is characterized by love despite the couple's ongoing arguments and miscommunication.

The Soweto Gospel Choir-assisted track "Brighter Days" has been described as an "uplifting song both in its musicality and lyricism." OkayAfrica's Sabelo Mkhabela said that while the track "borrows elements of gospel music," the band's "urban aesthetic is not lost." In the soulful, upbeat track "Nenda Lote", Sauti Sol describes a shattered marriage and its difficulties. "Suzanna" depicts a young woman who has strayed and is being urged to return home; the song also discusses the lengths young people will go to in order to live luxuriously. On the acapella interlude "Set Me Free", Sauti Sol expresses nostalgia for their youth and reflects on the good old days. The India Arie-assisted track "My Everything" has been described as a "slower paced romantic jam". Tangaza magazine's Amani Mugofwa commended the song for "encouraging listeners to recognize their worth and not settle for anything less than they deserve."

The percussive track "Wake Up" evokes the desire to dance. "Sober" discusses mistakes people make in life as well as other issues they face on a daily basis. The nostalgic track "Rhumba Japani" is influenced by Congolese rumba; the song features vocals by Kaskazini, Bensoul, Nviiri, Xenia, Okello Max, and Nairobi Horns Project. The energetic track "Disco Matanga (Yambakhana)" was inspired by the Afro-house sound; it features vocals by Sho Madjozi and Black Motion. In a review for the website Hinya, Ruguru said the song "does not only own its languages, but marries the cultural energies in a confident and possessive fusion".

== Critical reception ==
Professional ratings
Review scores
Source	Rating
Chalked Up Reviews	A-

Midnight Train received positive reviews from music critics. Brice Boorman, who writes for the online publication Chalked Up Reviews, awarded the album an A− rating, characterizing it as a "musical journey" and commending Sauti Sol for "overcoming their trials and tribulations with unity and perseverance". Tangaza magazine's Amani Mugofwa said the band's "way of telling stories through their songs gives them a special way of connecting to their audience." Writing for The Lagos Review, Adeola Juwon called the album a "striking piece of work" and said Sauti Sol "pushed the envelope forward, establishing themselves as the best music group presently in Africa".

Music in Africa's Lucy Ilado considered Midnight Train to be the band's magnum opus and said it is "a fantastic summary of their accomplishments so far, and charts a path towards an exciting new era for East African pop." A writer for the website Hinya, who goes by the moniker Ruguru, said the album's "stellar moments are uplifting and energetic" and that Sauti Sol "excels the most when joyous and casual". Conversely, Ruguru felt the band is still too "shy to display the extent of vulnerability necessary for making their journey emotively enduring, for them, and for their listeners".

== Track listing ==
Midnight Train track listing
No.	Title	Writer(s)	Producer(s)	Length
1.	"Intro"	Bienaimé Baraza; Crystal Asige; Polycarp Otieno; Savara Mudigi; Willis Chimano	Sauti Sol	1:10
2.	"Midnight Train"	Baraza; Otieno; Mudigi; Chimano	Sauti Sol	3:52
3.	"Insecure"	Andre Harris; Baraza; Otieno; Mudigi; Chimano	Sauti Sol; Andre Harris	3:10
4.	"Feel My Love"	Baraza; Ndumiso Manana; Otieno; Mudigi; Chimano	Sauti Sol	3:57
5.	"Brighter Days" (featuring Soweto Gospel Choir)	Baraza; Otieno; Mudigi; Chimano	Mboks; Sauti Sol	3:47
6.	"Nenda Lote"	Baraza; Otieno; Mudigi; Chimano	Mboks; Sauti Sol	4:24
7.	"Suzanna"	Baraza; Nviiri Sande; Pascal Ley; Otieno; Mudigi; Chimano	Sauti Sol	3:50
8.	"Set Me Free" (Interlude)	Baraza; Otieno; Mudigi; Chimano	Sauti Sol	2:31
9.	"My Everything" (featuring India Arie)	Baraza; Edward Mokolo Jr.; India Simpson; Otieno; Mudigi; Chimano	Kaysha; Sauti Sol	3:51
10.	"Wake Up" (featuring Mortimer)	Baraza; Mortimer McPherson; Otieno; Mudigi; Chimano	Mboks; Sauti Sol	3:43
11.	"Sober"	Harris; Baraza; Otieno; Mudigi; Chimano	Harris; Sauti Sol	3:19
12.	"Rhumba Japani" (featuring Bensoul, NHP, Nviiri the Storyteller, Okello Max, and Xenia Manasseh)	Benson Mutua; Baraza; Derrick Gaitara; Joe Mutoria; Julius Mcrymboh; Kagwe Mungai; Sande; Otieno; Mudigi; Chimano; Xenia Manasseh	Sauti Sol; DTX; Kagwe Mungai	3:51
13.	"Disco Matanga (Yambakhana)" (featuring Black Motion and Sho Madjozi)	Baraza; Bongani Mohosana; Maya Wegerif; Otieno; Roy Mabogwane; Mudigi; Chimano	Sauti Sol; Sho Madjozi; Black Motion	4:12
Total length:				45:00

== Personnel ==
Credits adapted from AllMusic and Spotify.

- Sauti Sol – primary artist, producer
- Okello Max – primary artist, vocals
- NHP – primary artist, vocals
- Black Motion – primary artist, vocals
- The Soweto Gospel Choir – primary artist, vocals
- Nviiri the Storyteller – primary artist, vocals
- Benson Mutuya – primary artist, composer, vocals
- Maya Wegerif – primary artist, composer, vocals
- India Simpson – primary artist, composer, vocals
- Mortimer McPherson – primary artist, composer, vocals
- Savara Mudigi – composer, vocals, producer
- Bienaimé Baraza – composer, vocals, producer
- Willis Chimano – composer, vocals, producer
- Otieno Polycarp – composer, guitar, producer
- Tabu Ley Rochereau – composer
- Nviiri Sande – composer
- Ndumiso Manana – composer
- Julius Okello McRymboh – composer
- Edward Mokolo – composer
- Derrick Gaitara – composer
- Crystal Asige – composer
- Andre "Dre" Harris – composer, producer
- Roy Mabogwane – composer, producer
- Kagwe Mungai – composer, producer
- Bongani Mohosana – composer, producer
- Joe Mutoria – composer, keyboards
- Wendy Kemunto – vocals
- Trevor Magak – vocals
- Tim Reynolds – vocals
- Stacy Kamatu – vocals
- Lisa Oduor Noah – vocals
- Chuchu – vocals
- Idd Aziz – percussion
- Amani Baya – drums
- Humphrey Otieno – drums
- Mackinely Musembi – horn
- Ivan Kwizera – bass, guitar (bass)
- Estelle Guy – guitar (bass), keyboards
- Kaysha – producer

== Release history ==
Release history and formats for Midnight Train
Region	Date	Format	Label	Ref
Various	March 31, 2023	Digital download; streaming	Universal Music Africa	
