= Blankets and Wine =

Pan-African music festival

Blankets and Wine is a pan-African Festival that combines music, fashion, food and family-friendly experiences. The festival was founded by Kenyan musician and cultural entrepreneur Muthoni Drummer Queen.

== History ==
Blankets and Wine started in 2008 as an event to showcase emerging Kenyan musicians. The picnic-styled event was initially held every first Sunday of the month. Attendees were supposed to bring a bottle of wine, a picnic basket and a blanket. They would then watch performances from local artists.

In 2012, the event was launched in Uganda. In 2017, the event was first held in Rwanda. The Rwanda edition would also have a segment called "New Kigali Set", which would include performances from local upcoming artists. In 2020, amidst COVID-19 lockdown restriction, Blankets & Wine held its first online edition. In 2025, organizers announced they would hold the first international edition of blankets and wine in the UK.

In 2022, Blankets and Wine Uganda banned children from attending the festival. In 2023 and 2024, the festival held four editions each year.

In 2025, Blankets and Wine announced that it would host three editions of the festival. Each edition will feature a main stage and a second stage, known as the Onja Onja stage and the Onja Onja market. The main stage will feature seven artists who will be performing live. The Onja Onja stage will feature seven DJs. The Onja Onja market on the other hand, is where local artisans and vendors showcase and sell their items.

== Festival summary by year ==
=== Blankets and Wine Kenya ===
| Edition | Year | Country | Venue | Date | Headliners | Ref |
|---|---|---|---|---|---|---|
| 24 | 2011 | Kenya | Mamba Village Leisure Garden | April 3 | Thandiswa Mazwai | |
| 27 | 2011 | Kenya | Leisure Gardens, Mamba Village | July 10 | | |
| 29 | 2011 | Kenya | Leisure Gardens, Mamba Village | September 4 | Mafikizolo | |
| 32 | 2012 | Kenya | Leisure Gardens, Mamba Village | March 4 | Lira | |
| | 2012 | Kenya | Leisure Gardens, Mamba Village | August 5 | Sauti Sol Tumi Yunasi Michel Ongaro | |
| 38 | 2012 | Kenya | Leisure Gardens, Mamba Village | October 7 | Juliani Fena Gitu Harry Kimani Kamba | |
| 40 | 2012 | Kenya | Leisure Gardens, Mamba Village | December 2 | Madtraxx Dan Chizi Aceda Makadem Andrew Wambua Afrology the Band | |
| | 2013 | Kenya | Leisure Gardens, Mamba Village | | Liquideep | |
| 44 | 2013 | Kenya | Carnivore | June 2 | Zahara | |
| 46 | 2013 | Kenya | Carnivore | August 4 | Kidum | |
| 50 | 2014 | Kenya | | January 4 and January 5 | Mafikizolo Mi Casa Sauti Sol | |
| | 2016 | Kenya | Ngong Racecourse and Golf Park | July 10 | Estelle | |
| | 2017 | Kenya | | April 9 | AKA (rapper) | |
| | 2019 | Kenya | Ngong Racecourse and Golf Park | December 22 | Koffee | |
| | 2024 | Kenya | Laureate Gardens, Moi International Sports Center | April 7 | Wurld Eric Wainaina Wanavokali Fena Gitu Chris Kaiga | |
| | 2024 | Kenya | Laureate Gardens, Moi International Sports Center | July 28 | Savara Nikita Kering Samthing Soweto Bensoul | |
| | 2024 | Kenya | Laureate Gardens- Moi International Sports Center in Nairobi | October 6 | Nasty C | |
| December | 2024 | Kenya | Laureate Gardens, Moi International Sports Center | December 22 | Nyashinski Wakadinali Necessary Noize Watendawili Njerae | |
| | 2025 | Kenya | Laureate Gardens, Moi International Sports Centre | June 29 | Mi Casa | |

=== Blankets and Wine Uganda ===
| Edition | Year | Country | Venue | Dates | Headliners | Ref |
|---|---|---|---|---|---|---|
| 3 | 2013 | Uganda | Uganda Museum | March 31 | Madtraxx Tamba The Sundowners Band Winston and Pragmo | |
| 8 | 2014 | Uganda | Uganda Museum | December 14 | Freshlyground | |
| 9 | 2015 | Uganda | Uganda Museum | | Eric Wainaina | |
| 10 | 2015 | Uganda | | September 27 | Zahara | |
| 11 | 2015 | Uganda | Uganda Museum | December 13 | Kansoul Kenneth Mugabi Swahili Nation | |
| 12 | 2016 | Uganda | Uganda Museum | March 27 | Uhuru | |
| 15 | 2016 | Uganda | Lugogo Cricket Oval | December 18 | Ali kiba | |
| | 2017 | Uganda | Lugogo Cricket Oval | August 20 | Seyi Shay | |
| 19 | 2018 | Uganda | Lugogo Cricket Oval | May 6 | Heavy K The Ben Fik Fameica | |
| | 2018 | Uganda | Lugogo Cricket Oval | December 16 | Maleek Berry | |
| 22 | 2019 | Uganda | Lugogo Cricket Oval | April 28 | Shekhinah King Saha Sammy Kasule | |
| 23 | 2019 | Uganda | Lugogo Cricket Oval | August 25 | Skales | |
| 24 | 2019 | Uganda | Lugogo Cricket Oval | December 15 | Jidenna | |
| | 2022 | Uganda | Lugogo Cricket Oval | March 27 | Bruce Melodie Spice Diana Zex Bilangilangi Cosign Yenze Trroy Music Ebrahim Soul O Shakib Miss Deedan | |
| | 2022 | Uganda | Lugogo Cricket Oval | July 24 | Ayra Starr | |
| | 2022 | Uganda | Lugogo Cricket Oval | December 11 | Yemi Alade | |
| 29 | 2023 | Uganda | Lugogo Cricket Oval | April 30 | Cassper Nyovest Azawi Bensoul Mike Kaihura | |
| | 2023 | Uganda | Lugogo Cricket Oval | December 17 | Konshens | |
| 30 | 2023 | Uganda | Lugogo Cricket Oval | August 27 | Johnny Drille | |
| | 2024 | Uganda | Lugogo Cricket Oval | June 30 | Samthing Soweto | |

=== Blankets and Wine Rwanda ===
| Edition | Year | Country | Venue | Date | Headliners | Ref |
|---|---|---|---|---|---|---|
| 1 | 2017 | Rwanda | Kigali Golf Course | August 27 | Lillian Mbabazi Bruce Melodie Tresor | |
| 2 | 2017 | Rwanda | Kigali Golf Course | December 17 | | |
| | 2023 | Rwanda | Canal Olympia | September 3 | Mike Kayihura Alyn Sano Kivumbi King Angel Mutoni Sea Stars | |

=== Blankets and Wine Online Edition ===
| Edition | Year | Date | Headliners | Ref |
|---|---|---|---|---|
| 1 | 2020 | August 30 | Joeboy | |

=== Blankets and Wine International Edition ===
| Year | Edition | Country | Venue | Date | Headliners | Ref |
|---|---|---|---|---|---|---|
| 2025 | 1 | United Kingdom | Lister Park | September 6 | To be announced | |
