= Sol Generation Records =

- Industry: Music
- Founder: Bien-Aimé Baraza; Savara Mudigi; Willis Austin Chimano; Polycarp Otieno

Sol Generation Records is a Kenyan based music label, founded by Kenyan Afropop group Sauti Sol members; Bien-Aime Baraza, Savara Mudigi, Willis Austin Chimano and Polycarp Otieno. The label was founded in 2019.

== History ==
In 2019 Sol Generation signed its first artist, Bensoul, a Kenyan musician. In the same year, the label signed Kenyan artists; Nviiri The Story Teller, Kaskazini (now Watendawili) and Crystal Asige. Within the same year Crystal Asige amicably left the label. Kaskazini (now Watendawili), also exited the label, citing having difficulties adjusting to being in a label. In 2021, the label signed Bien Aime Baraza, one of the cofounders and members of Sauti Sol. The other cofounders and Sauti Sol members Savara, Chimano and Polycarp are also signed to the label.

In 2022, former signee Crystal Asige sued Sol Generation Records and Sauti Sol for breech of contract. She also wanted compensation for the songs she contributed towards while signed to the label.

In 2023, Bensol announced his departure from the label, to pave way for newer artists. In 2024, Nviiri the Story Teller also announced his departure from the label.

In 2023, Sol Generation announced an Artist Development Programme aimed at developing 300 East African artists. The program is meant to develop their skills including songwriting, music distribution, brand development and financial management.

In 2024, Sol Generation signed a new Kenyan female artist, Le'Laika. In the same year, the label also signed Mordecai Mwini of the Kenyan band, H-art The Band.

== TV Show ==
In 2020, Sol Generation founders; Bien, Savara, Chimano, Polycarp, and the then signees; Bensoul and Nviiri were part of the reality show Sol Family. The show followed their personal lives and business within the label. The show aired from 2020 to 2021 for two seasons
