= Kristoff MWB =

- Also known as: Kristoff
- Born: Christopher Namwaya; March 5, 1989 (age 36)
- Genres: Hip-hop; Pop; Genge
- Occupations: Rapper; Singer-songwriter; Entrepreneur
- Years active: 2013–present
- Labels: CMG USA Records

Christopher Namwaya, popularly known as Kristoff MWB or simply Kristoff, is a Kenyan musician who gained initial recognition in 2013 following the release of his track Tatoo Kwa Thigh. He is known for his collaborations with Kenyan artists and a musical style that incorporates catchy melodies and lyrics in Swahili and Kenyan slang.

== Career ==
Kristoff's journey in music began as a DJ before he transitioned to becoming a mainstream recording artist. His breakthrough arrived in 2013 with the release of "Tatoo Kwa Thigh," a single that quickly gained popularity and significant airplay, marking his entry into the Kenyan music scene.

He has collaborated with a variety of Kenyan musicians across multiple genres, including Khaligraph Jones, Trio Mio, Kaytrixx, Yvonne Darcq, and Kush Tracey. This extensive collaborative work has contributed to his recognition within the Kenyan music scene.

In 2014, Kristoff's collaboration with Khaligraph Jones on a music video received attention within the Kenyan music industry. By 2017, his collaborative work was noted by media outlets, which highlighted his production of collaborative tracks."

In 2023, Kristoff announced his return to performing and recording after a two-year period of inactivity. DJ Poizon Ivy provided funding for his comeback single, "Bigman Party." He performed in Meru, Kenya, and subsequently toured the United States in 2023. During the US tour, he performed a sold-out concert in Delaware.

His discography includes tracks such as Tatoo Kwa Thigh, Umeniwai, Asubuhi na Mapema (with Trio Mio), Rhumba ya mapenzi, Bigman Party, Inakam (with Kaytrixx), and Niko Fresh. His music features lyrics in Swahili and Kenyan slang, alongside melodies and rhythmic beats. Common themes in his songs address contemporary Kenyan youth and social experiences.

In 2022, Kristoff and musician Gabu were appointed as ambassadors for the Huduma Card, an initiative by the Government of Kenya. Also in 2022, Kristoff together with Kenyan singer Nakoche distributed jerseys and foodstuffs to youth in Kawangware, highlighting his participation in community initiatives.

== Discography ==
Kristoff discography
Song title	Artist role	Year
Tatoo Kwa Thigh	Lead Artist	2013
Niko Fiti	Lead Artist	2016
Umeniwahi	Lead Artist	2017
Bigman Party	Lead Artist	2022
Rhumba ya mapenzi	Lead Artist	2023
Asubuhi na Mapema (feat. Trio Mio)	Lead Artist	2024
Bash (Kristoff ft. Yvonne Darcq, Kush Tracey, DJ Bash)	Featured Artist	2019
Single (feat. Kristoff)	Featured Artist	2019
Inakam (Kaytrixx and Kristoff)	Featured Artist	2020
Come Over (feat. Kristoff)	Featured Artist	2023
DZADDY (feat. Kristoff)	Featured Artist	Unknown
