= Breeder LW =

Kenyan rapper

- Born: Paul Baraka; July 11, 1997 (age 28); Mathare, Nairobi
- Genres: Rap; Hip-hop
- Years active: 2018 — present
- Label: Tough Klan Records

Paul Baraka (born 11 July 1997) professionally known as Breeder LW is a Kenyan hip-hop artist and rapper. He gained initial recognition in 2019 following the release of Do Re Mi featuring Benzema.

== Early life and education ==
Breeder LW was born in Mathare, Nairobi and raised in Dagoretti, Nairobi. During his high school years in Nairobi and later Iten, he began writing lyrics and participating in local rap battles. He was a member of a rap trio called the “Lyrical Wizards,” from which he derived the initials "LW" for his stage name.

== Career ==
Breeder LW began experimenting with rap in 2014 and turned professional around 2017. His early work includes the EP Nairobi State of Mind (NSOM). In 2019, he released his debut album, Kabla Kuosa, which included both introspective tracks and "street anthems." His single Bazenga Dadii gained significant attention on Kenyan radio and digital platforms. His second album, Bazenga Mentality, was released in 2021 and included tracks like "Bio Na Chem," "Boss Ofkos," and "Drop Zone," becoming his most-streamed album across digital platforms. In November 2023, Breeder LW released his third album, MIDAS TOUCH, featuring collaborations with Kenyan artists such as Okello Max, Red Fourth Chorus, Trio Mio, Maandy, and Buruklyn Boyz.

Breeder blends traditional hip-hop with Kenyan storytelling and social commentary. He is known for his fast delivery, complex rhyme schemes and a style that combines old-school influences with modern flows including Arbantone and Gengetone. He has stated in interviews that research into both sound and image is crucial to his creative process.

In 2019, Breeder LW appeared on Khaligraph Jones' "Khali Cartel 3" alongside other Kenyan rappers, including Bey T, Silverstone Barz, Rekles, and Chiwawa. This collaboration is considered a significant moment in Kenyan hip-hop.

In 2024, Breeder LW collaborated with Winnie Odinga on a freestyle rap, which garnered media attention in Kenya.

== Discography ==
Discography
Year	Title	Type	Details
2019	Kabla Kuosa	Album	Debut Album
2021	Bazenga Mentality	Album	Second Album
2023	Midas Touch	Album	Third Album
2022	Vibes N Ting	EP	EP
Singles	"Missed Call"	Single	
Singles	"Genjeness"	Single	
Singles	"Dedi Dedilee"	Single	
Singles	"Dance Mpyai"	Single	
Singles	"Ni Kubaya"	Single	
