= Fena Gitu =

Kenyan rapper and producer (born 1991)

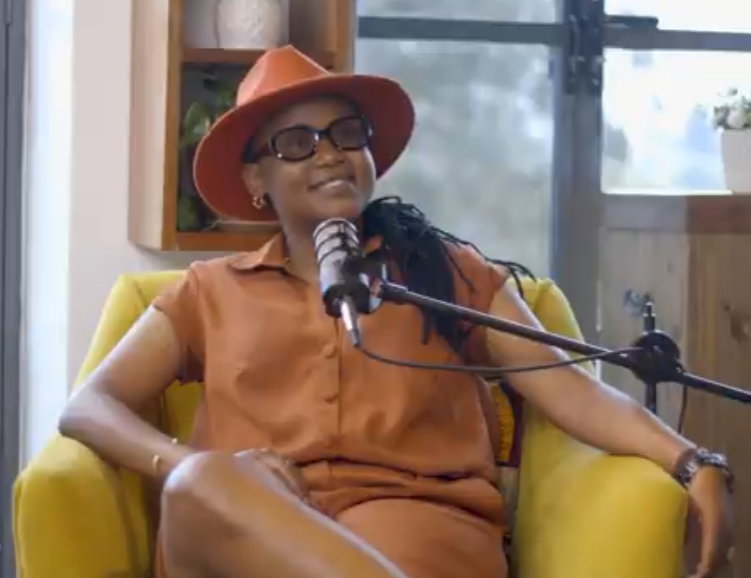
- In a 2023 interview

Background information
- Also known as: Fenamenal Woman
- Born: Wanjiru Gitu; 25 April 1991 (age 34); Nairobi, Kenya
- Education: Precious Blood Secondary School (Riruta); United States International University Africa
- Occupations: Rapper, producer, songwriter and fashion entrepreneur

Fena Gitu (born 25 April 1991), real name Wanjiru Gitu, also known as the "Fenamenal Woman", is a Kenyan rapper, producer, songwriter and fashion entrepreneur. She is best known for her single "Doing Her Thing Tho".

== Education ==
Gitu was born as Wanjiru Gitu on 25 April 1991 in Nairobi, Kenya, and attended Precious Blood Secondary School (Riruta). She studied International Relations and Psychology at the United States International University.

== Career ==
Gitu is a rapper, producer and songwriter, also known as the "Fenamenal Woman". Her fans refer to themselves as "Fenatics".

Gitu began her career as a gospel singer. In 2008, Gitu won the Fete de la Musique competition at Alliance Francaise in Nairobi. After this, in 2009 she joined Dela as a backing singer, before going solo in 2010.

Gitu has collaborated with artists including Sylvia Robina, also known as "Rawbeen;" Chris Kaiga, Okello Max; Mejja; Sauti Sol; and Wangechi. She has also written songs for Tiwa Savage and Sauti Sol.

In 2017, Gitu performed at the Afro-punk Celebration in New York City, launched the Fena Gitu Foundation and won Best Female Artist at the Groove Awards in Kenya. She has performed in a personal concert series called "Fena Unplugged".

In 2019, Gitu was featured on the "Boom Queens" takeover in celebration of International Women's Day on the audio streaming service Boomplay.

When her former producer Jaaz Odongo was accused of sexual assault by Janice Iche in 2020, Gitu stopped working with him and released a press statement saying that: "I have decided to no longer work with Jaaz or anyone else that is accused of sexual assault or other misconduct. It's been difficult to navigate, but I just don't see a different way forward at this time."

In 2021, Gitu launched the FenamenalxDenri collection of leather travel bags with the brand Denri Africa. She is also a Smirnoff vodka brand ambassador.

Gitu performed with an orchestra at the International Women's Day Concert at the Kenya Conservatoire of Music in 2022. In 2023, Gitu was named as one of Meta's eight "rising African stars", to mark Africa Day. In 2024, Gitu was appointed EQUAL Africa ambassador for audio streaming service Spotify.

In 2023, Gitu performed at celebrations for the 60th Jamhuri Day. In 2024, she performed alongside artists including Wurld and Eric Wainaina at the Pan-African music festival Blankets and Wine at the Moi International Sports Centre in Kasarani.

== Discography ==
=== Albums ===
- Fena (2011)
- Unleashed (2019)
- Fenamenal (2021)
- LAL (2023), which stands for "Love. Art. Lust"

=== Singles ===
- "Ndoto" (2017)
- "Doing Her Thing Tho" (2017)
- "Rise Up" (2022)
- "Love Is" (2023)
- "Let Me Go" (2023)
- "Pogna Matin" (2023)
- "Spirit" (2023)
- "Pretty Girl" (2025)

== Personal life ==
It has been speculated in the Kenyan media that Gitu is a lesbian. Gitu has said of the rumours about her sexuality that: "I'm just single and out here but I'm focusing on my work. As for my sexuality, it's no one's business. Even you when people are always on your case in blogs and stuff, it's no one's business what you're doing in your home and I don't wanna feed that, I'm here because I'm a musician first."

In 2023, there was media speculation that Gitu was dating the Marini Naturals CEO Michelle Ntallami, which both women have denied. Gitu has also been rumoured to be dating television personality Edith Kimani.
