= Nviiri the Storyteller =

- Born: Nviiri Sande; 19 August 1991 (age 34)
- Origin: Kenya
- Genres: Afropop; R&B
- Instrument: Guitar
- Formerly of: Sol Generation Records

Nviiri Sande (born 19 August 1991), professionally known as Nviiri the Storyteller is a Kenyan singer and songwriter. In 2019, he gained mainstream recognition following being signed to Sol Generation Records and the release of the song Extravaganza.

== Early life ==
Nviiri attended Dagoretti High School, Nairobi. He studied mechanical engineering in college and later worked at his father's workshop.

== Career ==
Before signing with Sol Generation Records, Nviiri worked as a behind-the-scenes videographer for Sauti Sol. The boy band did not know Nviiri could sing and only knew after Bien heard him play the guitar. Bien encouraged Nviiri to pursue music. Nviiri was part of a gospel band and toured South Korea. Nviiri wrote Melanin for Sauti Sol featuring Patoranking.

Nviiri broke into the mainstream scene in 2019, following the release of the song Extravaganza, which announced new Sol Generation signees. He then released Pombe Sigara.

In 2021, he released a six-track EP, Kitenge. It included the songs; Baridi featuring Sanaipei Tande, Mae Wendi, Kitenge, Niko Sawa featuring Bien, Bembeleza and Birthday Song featuring Khaligraph Jones, Sauti Sol and Bensoul. Beverly Kaiga of Tangaza Magazine writes that the album "details the love story of a couple that is fated to fail, as predicted in the Tarot cards on the EP's album art". In 2021, the song Niko Sawa, was the most-streamed song in Kenya on Spotify. In the same year, he also released the single Nikita.

In 2023, he released his album Inside Out which includes 15 tracks. The album included collaborations with artists like Bien, Bensoul, Chike and Bayanni. The album has three phases Bwana Sherehe (party animal), Love & Heartbreak and Consciousness. The song Nikilewa, from the album was listed by Rolling Stone on the Top 40 Best Afropop Songs of 2023 list.

In 2024, he announced that he was leaving Sol Generation Records following the end of his five-year contract with the label.

== Artistry ==
Nviiri is described as a blend of Afropop, soul and R & B.

== Awards and recognition ==
=== Awards ===
Awards	Year	Recipient (S) and nominee (S)	Category	Result	Ref
African Muzik Magazine Awards (AFRIMMA)	2021	Nviiri The Storyteller	Best Male Artist in Eastern Africa	Nominated	
African Muzik Magazine Awards (AFRIMMA)	2021	‘Nairobi’ by Bensoul ft. Sauti Sol, Nviiri the Storyteller	Best African Video	Nominated	
African Muzik Magazine Awards (AFRIMMA)	2021	Sauti Sol ft Bensoul, Nviiri The Storyteller, Xeniah & NHP	Best Artist, Duo or Band	Nominated	
Pulse Music Video Awards	2021	Nviiri The Storyteller ft Bien-Niko sawa	Best Collaboration of the Year	Nominated	
Pulse Music Video Awards	2021	Bensoul, Sauti Sol, Nviiri & Mejja- Nairobi	Best Collaboration of the Year	Nominated	
Pulse Music Video Awards	2022	Nviiri The Storyteller-Nikita	Male Video of the Year	Nominated	

=== Recognition ===
In 2021, Business Daily listed him in the Top 40 Under 40 list.
