= Hart The Band =

Kenyan band

H_art The Band
- Origin: Nairobi, Kenya
- Genres: Afropop
- Years active: 2012-present
- Members: Mordecai Mwini Wachira Gatama Kenneth Muya

H_art The Band is a Kenyan Afropop band from Nairobi, Kenya formed in 2012 by artists Mordecai Mwini, Kenneth Muya, and Wachira Gatama Abednego. They started releasing music in 2014 with their debut single Uliza Kiatu.

In 2021, Advance Media, listed H_art The Band in the Top 100 African Musicians List.

In 2024, Mordecai, a member of the band, signed a 3-year deal with Sol Generation Publishing.

== History ==
=== 2012: Formation and early years ===
The band was formed in 2012 when the three members met during a play on cancer awareness at the Kenya National Theatre. They discovered their mutual interest for music, poetry, fashion and arts. Hart The Band, started recording music together in 2013. Initially, the group was called The Young Achievers.

They then joined Penya Africa's artist development program provided by Sauti Academy where they graduated in 2014. They were signed to Penya Africa until 2016, after which they formed their own label H_art the Brand's Label.

=== 2014-2016: Singles ===
H_art The Band gained popularity in 2014, with the release of their song "Uliza Kiatu". Stellar Murumba describes the song as an "afro-fusion modern song synchronized with spoken word" The song highlighted the difficulties that men face when dating. Lyrics such as "Masaibu ninayoyapitia, kukupeleka dinner", are a reflection of the struggles men undergo to afford a dinner date.

The song was followed up by another single, "Nikutazama", released in December 2014. The song was a love song appreciating African beauty. This song landed them two nominations at the All Africa Music Awards in 2015. In 2015, they released the singles Lovephobic and Baby Love.

In 2016, they released their first collaboration, "Adabu", with Kenyan musician Dela. In the same year they released "Masheesha", a collaboration with Kenyan musician Bensoul. "Masheesha" talked about ordering sheesha in a club without having the money to pay for it. Unlike their previous releases, these new singles leaned into a pop sound and were club bangers in Kenya. Abigail Arunga wrote "H_art the Band has distinctively managed to disengage themselves from their initial spoken word style fame, crossing the bridge towards more commercial club-bangers with their recent hits 'Adabu' and now, 'Masheesha'".

=== 2016: Shoekran album ===
Shoekran was a wordplay for the Swahili word 'shukrani', meaning thank you and paying an ode to their hit single Uliza Kiatu. Kiatu is the Swahili word for shoe.

=== 2019: Made in the streets album ===
In 2019, H_art The Band released a 19-track album, Made in the streets. Majority of the songs on the album delved into "blue-eyed romantic sentiments" and some other songs delved into "contemplative and religious subject matter". Lover Lover for example, is a love song while Bad Manners, a collaboration with Victoria Kimani, is a club song. Elshadai carries a message of hope. The album had "live sounds" and "snappy pop hits". Lucy Ilado wrote "holds the listener's attention with varied instrumentation, solid vocals, catchy melodies and slam poetry interspersed with the familiar slang phrases of Nairobi's millennial generation" The album included collaborations with artists from East Africa including Sautisol, Bensoul, Nyota Ndogo and Nigerian artist Seyi Shay. The album received commercial success and a year later they celebrated the album getting 8 million streams.

=== 2021: Simple Man Album ===
In 2021, they released their third album, Simple Album, themed The soundtracks of our lives. The album focused on the love, resilience and following your dreams. The album has six songs Simple Man, Wait for It Ft Matt Owegi, Every day, Na Bado ft Nyashinski, MyJaber ft Brizy Annechild, and Milele. The songs included lyrics written in English, Swahili and Sheng. The album revolved around themes of "love, resilience, following your dreams and life - the never-ending journey". Lucy Ilado of MusicAfrica wrote "it offers a more mature perspective than the boy band has presented to date through its discography, through catchy tracks and a cohesive sound". The album included several collaborations including on the track Na Bado with Kenyan rapper and singer Nyashinski. They also collaborated with Kenyan artist Brizy Annechild on the track My Jaber and also collaborated with Trumpet Chorale SDA Choir on the song Milele.

=== 2022: Party Time Album ===
In 2022, H_art The Band released their fourth album, Party Time, which has seven songs. The album's theme was celebrating wins no matter how small and togetherness. Mkala Mwaghesha wrote "The seven-song output packaged as a party album, an experimental straying away from the slow, love ballads the band has always been known for. But at the centre of it is love, the subject matter that has made the band resonate with fans locally and internationally".

=== 2023: Time Love H_art Emojis Album ===
In 2024 and to celebrate 10 years in music, H_art The Band released their album Time: Love H_art Emojis. The album is a concept album that addressed "chronology of love, life and relationships" and took listeners through the " 'near’ redundant nature of Life, showcasing euphonious sound, skill and honesty in lyrics". Frank Njugi writes that 11 songs of the album "lean towards softness more than bravado; tenderness over friction"

The album's cover features a circular timepiece with different emojis replacing the numeric usually used for timepieces. The different emojis depicted the different stages of a relationship.

KBC wrote "Time doubles as a heartfelt tribute to the roller-coaster of life while providing a candid window into the band's mastery of the craft, through their ten-year voyage".

== Artistry ==
=== Musical style ===
H_art The Band's musical style has been described as afro-poetry, that combines African-inspired harmonies and a touch of spoken word poetry.

Their style has also been described as "Afro-fusion" and as "Afro-pop".

Their lyrics have been described as "meaningful" and "powerful", "wistful" and as having "ghetto roots".

== Band members ==
Mordecai Mwini- Lead singer

Kenneth Muya- Guitarist

Wachira Gatama- Poet

== Discography ==
=== Studio albums ===
Made In The Streets (2019)

Simple Man (2021)

Party Time (2022)

Time Love H_art Emojis (2023)

== Awards and nominations ==
| Awards | Year | Recipient(S) and nominee(S) | Category | Result | Ref |
|---|---|---|---|---|---|
| Bingwa Awards | 2015 | H_art The Band | Stage Performer of the Year | Won | |
| All Africa Music Awards (AFRIMA) | 2015 | H_art The Band | Revelation of the African continent | Nominated | |
| All Africa Music Awards (AFRIMA) | 2015 | H_art The Band | Most Promising Artiste in Africa | Nominated | |
| Kalasha Awards | 2018 | H_art The Band | Best Original Score | Nominated | |
| Pulse Music Video Awards Kenya | 2020 | H_art The Band | Best Group of the Year | Nominated | |
| Pulse Music Video Awards Kenya | 2020 | "El Shaddai"- H_art The Band ft. Cedo | Most Viewed Nominated Video of the Year | Won | |
| Pulse Music Video Awards Kenya 2022 | 2022 | H_art The Band | Best Group of the year | Nominated | |
| Pulse Music Video Awards Kenya 2022 | 2022 | "Jienjoy"- H_art The Band ft. Sauti Sol | Best Group video of the Year | Nominated | |
| East Africa Entertainment Awards | 2022 | Hart The Band | Best Music group | Nominated | |
| East Africa Entertainment Awards | 2022 | Hart The Band | Best live band performance act | Nominated | |
| East Africa Entertainment Awards | 2022 | Hart The Band | Best Kenya hit song | Nominated | |
| Pulse Music Video Awards Kenya | 2023 | H_art The Band | Best Group | Nominated | |
