= Ken Wakia =

Kenyan choral conductor

- Born: Homa Bay, Kenya
- Occupations: Singer; Choral conducting; Music educator
- Years active: 2005 - present
- Known for: Choral Conductor
- Notable work: Niko na Safaricom
- Title: Founder at Nairobi Chamber Chorus
- Website: Ken Wakia

Ken Wakia is a Kenyan singer, choral conductor, and music educator. He is known for his work in choral music in Kenya. He is the founding director of the Nairobi Chamber Chorus, established in 2005. Wakia served as a Cultural and Educational Affairs Specialist at the United States Embassy in Nairobi between 2010 and 2022. In 2024, he was named among the Top 100 Most Influential Africans by New African Magazine.

== Early life and education ==
Wakia was born in Kenya. He began his early education at Ruga Primary School in Homa Bay County and later went to Mumias Complex Primary School and eventually to Musingu High School in Kakamega. He later earned a Bachelor of Education in Music from Kenyatta University. He obtained a Master of Music in choral conducting from the University of Miami as a Fulbright scholar, where he studied under choral conductor Jo-Michael Scheibe.

== Career ==
=== Early career ===
Wakia began his professional career as a music teacher at Precious Blood Secondary School in Nairobi. He later joined Africa Nazarene University, where he served as Assistant Dean of Students and head of music. From 2010 to 2022, he worked at the United States Embassy in Nairobi as a Cultural and Educational Affairs Specialist. Wakia represented Kenya at the prestigious World Youth Choir as a singer and became one of the choir's conductors in 2017.

=== Nairobi Chamber Chorus ===
In October 2005, Wakia founded the Nairobi Chamber Chorus (NCC), a choral group composed primarily of young singers from Kenyan universities and music institutions. Under his leadership, NCC has performed a wide repertoire ranging from African choral works to Western classical and contemporary music. The choir has performed for the British royal family during the Diamond Jubilee of Queen Elizabeth II at Windsor Castle in 2012, and at the American Choral Directors Association national conference in Kansas City in 2019.

Wakia has also led the choir on international tours across Europe, Asia, the Middle East, Australia, and North America. The group has collaborated in productions such as Hans Zimmer Live and The World of Hans Zimmer, associated with composer Hans Zimmer.

=== Safaricom Choir ===
Wakia directed the establishment of the Safaricom Choir within Safaricom in 2009, following a proposal by then chief executive Michael Joseph. Safaricom Choir gained national recognition through the 2010 campaign song “Niko na Safaricom”.

== Recognition ==
- 2019: African Image Maker Award by Voice Achievers Award International.
- 2024: Named among the Top 100 Most Influential Africans by New African Magazine.
