= Helule Helule =

1966 song written by Daudi Kabaka

- Cover of the single released in Germany

Single by the Tremeloes
- B-side: "Girl from Nowhere"
- Released: 3 May 1968
- Genre: Pop
- Length: 2:50
- Label: CBS; Epic
- Songwriters: Daudi Kabaka; Len "Chip" Hawkes; Alan Blakley
- Producer: Mike Smith

The Tremeloes singles chronology
"Suddenly You Love Me" (1968)	"Helule Helule" (1968)	"My Little Lady" (1968)

"Helule Helule" is a Swahili song written by Kenyan musician Daudi Kabaka. It was first released as a single by Kabaka and fellow Kenyan musician George Agade in 1966 through Equator Records. However, the song is better known for the version by British group the Tremeloes, who kept the original chorus and added English verses, with it becoming a top-twenty hit in the UK in May 1968.

== The Tremeloes version ==
=== Background ===
The Tremeloes' manager Peter Walsh met Irving Wilson, owner of Rare Records and Disc Imports in Manchester, at a reception for the group and told him that he had an interest in African records. Wilson said that he had some and so Walsh and two of the Tremeloes, Len "Chip" Hawkes and Alan Blakley, went to Wilson's warehouse to listen to some of these records. They bought several of them, with Wilson saying that "they took out world options on three of them [from Equator Records], including "Helule Helule"". Rick Westwood was very disdainful of these records, but said that Hawkes and Blakley "wrote two songs, then scrapped them and took bits of them and joined them together", which led to the final song. After recording "Helule Helule", much to the appal of Wilson, the group attempted to reduce the royalties to be paid, claiming they had significantly altered the original version.

Despite being credited on the Tremeloes version, Kabaka claimed he never received mechanical copyright money for having written the song. According to a contract, the rights to "Helule Helule" were bought by Peter Walsh Music on 25 April 1968 for a sum of one shilling. However, elsewhere, it has been claimed that Kabaka received a "substantial licensing fee", which he shared with his producer and Equator owner Charles Worrod.

=== Reception ===
Reviewing for Record Mirror, Peter Jones wrote that "there is an automatic drumming kit featured on this – and certainly the basic jungle-type rhythms make it a stand-out production even for this stand-out group. African material, given English lyrics, and a tremendous sense of vitality". For Disc and Music Echo, Penny Valentine described it as "an absolutely astounding bit of lyrical brilliance" and that "it moves like nobody's business but somehow sounds a bit dated". Cash Box wrote "a steadily churning island rhythm, a Calypso-like lyric and delivery and a sprinkling of good hard rock are the prime ingredients of this latest Tremeloes concoction".

=== Charts ===
Chart (1968)	Peak position
Argentina (Escalera a la Fama)	7
Australia (Go-Set)	23
Australia (Kent Music Report)	29
Belgium (Ultratop 50 Flanders)	19
Belgium (Ultratop 50 Wallonia)	46
Canada Top Singles (RPM)	77
Finland (Suomen virallinen lista)	36
Germany (GfK)	20
Ireland (IRMA)	16
Malaysia (Radio Malaysia)	4
Netherlands (Dutch Top 40)	26
New Zealand (Listener)	13
Rhodesia (Lyons Maid)	13
Spain (Promusicae)	9
Sweden (Kvällstoppen)	17
Sweden (Tio i Topp)	8
UK Melody Maker Top 30	13
UK New Musical Express Top 30	10
UK Record Retailer Top 50	14
US Bubbling Under the Hot 100 (Billboard)	122
