= Crystal Asige =

Kenyan legislator and musician

Nominated Senator
- Incumbent
- Assumed office 7 September 2022

Personal details
- Born: 12 August 1990 (age 36) Mombasa, Kenya
- Party: ODM
- Education: University of the West of England (BA)
- Notable Awards: TIME100 Next emerging leaders (2024)
- Website: crystalasige.com

Crystal Kegehi Asige (born August 12, 1990) is a nominated senator in the parliament of Kenya under the Orange Democratic Movement (ODM). She is an advocate for diversity and inclusion and represents special interest groups such as youths and people living with disabilities. Asige is a singer, songwriter, and music producer focusing in Chakacha-infused music. She was previously signed under Sol Generation Records. Asige is a victim of glaucoma which led to the loss of her sight in her 20s and she continues to raise awareness about the condition.

== Early childhood and education ==
Asige spent her childhood in Mombasa. She holds a bachelor's degree on film studies and drama from the University of the West of England, Bristol. She is also an alumna of Mombasa Academy, having completed her O and A level studies there.

== Career ==
=== Private sector career ===
Upon completion of her undergraduate studies, Asige worked at BBC as a production management assistant from 2011 to 2013. She later moved to View Finder EPZ then Adam Smith International. She has also been working with Open Institute as a program manager.

Asige served at the board of Amnesty Kenya, before being nominated to the senate.

She is the vice chairperson of the Glaucoma Society of Kenya.

=== Political career ===
Asige was nominated into the 13th parliament of Kenya, under the Orange Democratic Movement party to represent People living with disabilities and the youth, in September 2022. She serves in the senate, which is the upper house.

As a serving senator, Asige has supported the passing of legislation that support people with disabilities, including tax breaks for caregivers and the promotion of Kenyan Sign Language.

Asige additionally serves as the secretary general of the Kenya Disabled Parliamentarians Association and chairperson for Persons with Disabilities in the Kenya Women Parliamentary Association.

=== Music career ===
Asige is a songwriter, producer and a performer. She was previously signed under Sol Generation Records and featured in some of their hit songs. However, in 2022 she sued them over some disagreement related to her contract and compensation.

As a solo artist, Asige has released several albums and singles and has featured too and contributed in other artists' music, such as Sauti Sol and Eric Wainaina.

Her first EP, Karibia, was released in December 2014. In November 2023 she released another EP, Blinding Allure, featuring Ywaya Tajiri. Her latest single, Better, was released on 28 November 2025.

Her other singles are Tattoo (2024), Ninajijua (2022), Nyota (2021), Lenga (2021) and Straight No Chaser (2020).

Her music blends several genres such as Afro Soul, Afro Pop and Funk music.

== Awards and recognition ==
In 2024, Asige was recognized among the TIME100 Next emerging leaders by Time Magazine. She was nominated by the United Nations Sustainable Development Goal Advocate Eddie Ndopu, who described her as an incredible individual who champions for rights of people living with disabilities.
