= Liz Aluvanze =

Kenyan engineer, aviation consultant and corporate executive

- Born: c. 1992 (age 33–34); Nairobi, Kenya
- Citizenship: Kenyan
- Education: University of Manchester; Cranfield University; University of California, Irvine
- Occupations: Engineer, businesswoman and corporate executive
- Years active: 2014–present
- Title: Chief executive officer at Kenya Association of Air Operators

Liz Aluvanze (born circa 1990) is a Kenyan aeronautical engineer, businesswoman, aviation consultant and corporate executive, who has been the chief executive officer of the Kenya Association of Air Operators (KAAO) since September 2022. The association brings together operators of helicopters, fixed-wing aircraft, hot air balloons, remotely-piloted drones, approved aviation maintenance organizations and approved aviation training institutions in Kenya.

== Background and education ==
Aluvaze was born c. 1990 in Nairobi, Kenya's capital city. She is the first born in a family of four siblings (three sisters and one brother). The family first lived in Buruburu; they later relocated to Kilimani. For her primary schooling, she attended Loreto Primary School before transferring to Makini School. She attended Precious Blood Secondary School (Riruta) for her O-Level education. She completed her A-Level education at Brookhouse School. Aluvanze excelled at all levels of her pre-university education.

In 2010, she was admitted to the University of Manchester in the United Kingdom. She graduated three years later with a Bachelor of Engineering degree in Aeronautical Engineering. She transferred to Cranfield University, also in the United Kingdom, where she graduated with a Masters in Air Transport Management degree. During the 2019/2020 academic year, she studied and obtained a Certificate in Project Management from the University of California, Irvine.

== Career ==
As of October 2022, Aluvaze's professional career had spanned over eight years. In 2014, she started as an operations intern at Fastjet, at their headquarters at that time, at Gatwick Airport in the United Kingdom. She relocated to Nairobi, Kenya, working as the commercial operations manager for Aberdair Aviation Group. She then worked for Kenya Airways and later for the Kenya Civil Aviation Authority. Her expertise spans "air transport, commercial services, fleet development, air law, and engineering services, technical and flight operations". At KAAO, she replaced Colonel (Retired) Eutychus K. Waithaka, who had been the association's CEO for the previous 25 years.

== Other considerations ==
After she left KCAA but before she was appointed CEO at KAAO, she ran her own aviation consultancy called Skylar Consult Limited.
