= Afrikan Sauce =

Studio album by Sauti Sol
- Released: January 31, 2019
- Genres: Afro-pop; R&B
- Label: Sauti Sol Entertainment
- Producers: Sauti Sol; Maleek Berry; Kaysha; BeatsByEmzo

Sauti Sol chronology
| Live and Die in Afrika (2015) | Afrikan Sauce (2019) | Midnight Train (2020) |

Singles from Afrikan Sauce
- 1. "Melanin" Released: November 21, 2017; 2. "Girl Next Door" Released: January 10, 2018; 3. "Afrikan Star" Released: February 14, 2018; 4. "Rewind" Released: March 27, 2018; 5. "Short N Sweet" Released: May 17, 2018; 6. "Tujiangalie" Released: August 22, 2018

Afrikan Sauce is the fourth studio album by Kenyan band Sauti Sol, released on their eponymous record label Sauti Sol Entertainment. Primarily an Afropop and R&B record, Afrikan Sauce marked a departure from the traditional acoustic sound of the band's previous albums. It features guest appearances from Patoranking, Tiwa Savage, Burna Boy, Vanessa Mdee, Yemi Alade, Khaligraph Jones, Nyashinski, Bebe Cool, Mi Casa, Toofan, Jah Prayzah and C4 Pedro. The album comprises thirteen tracks and was supported by the previously released singles "Melanin", "Girl Next Door", "Afrikan Star", "Short N Sweet" and "Tujiangalie". Afikan Sauce received positive reviews from music critics, who characterized it as a "game changer" and commended it for having "substantial replay value". The album won Album of the Year in Africa at the 2019 All Africa Music Awards.

== Background and promotion ==
Sauti Sol described the album as an "art and cultural exchange" project and said it would be released towards the end of 2017. They also announced plans to release a new track with a different African artist every month. However, this plan did not completely materialize due to financial constraints. The album features guest appearances from Patoranking, Tiwa Savage, Burna Boy, Vanessa Mdee, Yemi Alade, Khaligraph Jones, Nyashinski, Bebe Cool, Mi Casa, Toofan, Jah Prayzah and C4 Pedro.

=== "Melanin", "Girl Next Door", "Afrikan Star", and "Rewind" ===
The Patoranking-assisted track "Melanin" was released on November 21, 2017, as the album's lead single. Damilola Animashaun of Konbini Channels praised the band's vocals and Patoranking's dancehall sound. Sauti Sol was nominated for African Artiste of the Year at The Headies 2019 for "Melanin". The accompanying music video for "Melanin" was filmed in Lagos by Clarence Peters and features numerous shots of dark skin women, along with dance and performance scenes. Ezekiel Mutua, CEO of the Kenya Film Classification Board (KFCB), criticized the video and called it "absolute pornography". Mutua threatened to seek a court injunction to ban the song from airing and said Sauti Sol released the video without following Kenya's content production and distribution regulation laws. KFCB told Sauti Sol to submit the video for examination and classification for age suitability; the board also warned media stations not to air the song during watershed periods.

The album's second single, "Girl Next Door", was released on January 10, 2018. It features guest vocals by Nigerian singer Tiwa Savage and was produced by Maleek Berry. The Unlimited LA-directed video for "Girl Next Door" features laid-back individual scenes of Sauti Sol and Savage. The Burna Boy-assisted track "Afrikan Star" was released on February 14, 2018, as the album's third single. The song's music video was directed by Mex Films and recorded in an old mansion filled with colorful furniture and a large book collection. The nostalgic track "Rewind" was released on March 27, 2018, as the album's fourth single. A fusion of hip hop and Afrobeats, the song features a rap verse by Kenyan rapper Khaligraph Jones and was produced by Sauti Sol. The video for "Rewind" was directed by Sesan and contains old images and videos of the band.

=== "Short N Sweet", "Tujiangalie", and "Africa" ===
The Nyashinski-assisted track "Short N Sweet" was released on May 17, 2018, as the album's fifth single. The song was produced by Sauti Sol and mastered by Sarthak.OkayAfrica's Camille Storm said the track is "evocative of the early Sauti Sol days, with a strong acoustic instrumentation and acapella-driven background vocals". The accompanying music video for "Short N Sweet" was directed by Nate Thomas. "Short N Sweet" was nominated for Song of the Year and Video of the Year at the 2019 Soundcity MVP Awards Festival. The politically charged track "Tujiangalie" (Swahili: "Self-reflection") was released on August 22, 2018, as the album's sixth single. The song was recorded with Nyashinski and addresses several societal issues, including corruption, mounting debt, economic inequality, a crisis of leadership, and the troubling connection between the clergy and the political class. In a review for the website Paukwa, Ngoma Zetu said "Tujiangalie" "tells the truth in a raw way, but with fine tunes of the singers, listeners can only want to reflect on themselves".

Sauti Sol's collaborative single with Nigerian singer Yemi Alade, titled "Africa", was released on July 5, 2016. It was produced by BeatsByEmzo and first appeared on Alade's second studio album Mama Africa (2016). The music video for "Africa" was directed by Ovie Etseyatse and features clips of different streets and iconic towers in African cities, as well as pictures of renowned leaders fighting for independence.

== Composition ==
Primarily an Afropop and R&B record, Afrikan Sauce marked a departure from the traditional acoustic sound of the band's previous albums. In the mid-tempo track "Melanin", Sauti Sol and Patoranking celebrate women of color and declare love for a woman who broke their hearts. "Short N Sweet" is composed of reggae kicks, percussion, bass guitar and electric guitar licks. "Love Again" has elements of Kuduro and is reminiscent of "Say Yeah", a song from the band's third studio album Live and Die in Afrika (2015). In the politically-charged track "Tujiangalie", Sauti Sol denounces Kenya's current state. The Maleek Berry-produced track "Girl Next Door" contains Swahili lyrics and has a slow-paced reggae feel. In the mellow ballad "Afrikan Star", Sauti Sol and Burna Boy trade emotive verses back and forth.

== Critical reception ==
Afrikan Sauce received positive reviews from music critics. Beverly Wakiaga of Tangaza magazine said the album has substantial replay value, but ended the review saying it is "missing something that gives it that oomph and makes you take notice of the band". The Native's Toye Sokunbi called Afrikan Sauce a "game changer" and said it is a "template for Afropop that actually works to the advantage of the creators". Reviewing for The Star newspaper, journalist Davies Ndolo awarded the album 3 stars out of 5, saying it "depicts and incorporates the diversity and aesthetic that is Africa." Afrikan Sauce won Album of the Year in Africa at the 2019 All Africa Music Awards.

== Tracklisting ==
| No. | Title | Writer(s) | Producer(s) | Length |
|---|---|---|---|---|
| 1. | "Melanin" (featuring Patoranking) | Bienaimé Baraza; Nviiri Sande; Patrick Okorie; Polycarp Otieno; Savara Mudigi; Willis Chimano | Sauti Sol | 4:27 |
| 2. | "Girl Next Door" (featuring Tiwa Savage) | Baraza; Tiwatope Savage; Otieno; Mudigi; Chimano | Maleek Berry; Sauti Sol | 3:09 |
| 3. | "Afrikan Star" (featuring Burna Boy) | Baraza; Damini Ogulu; Otieno; Mudigi; Tom Olang'o; Chimano | Sauti Sol | 3:14 |
| 4. | "Rewind" (featuring Khaligraph Jones) | Baraza; Khaligraph Jones; Otieno; Mudigi; Chimano | Sauti Sol | 3:47 |
| 5. | "Short N Sweet" (featuring Nyashinski) | Baraza; Nyamari Ongegu; Otieno; Mudigi; Chimano | Sauti Sol | 3:43 |
| 6. | "Tujiangalie" (featuring Nyashinski) | Baraza; Ongegu; Otieno; Mudigi; Chimano | Sauti Sol | 3:41 |
| 7. | "Special Somebody" (with Jah Prayzah) | Baraza; Mukudzeyi Mukombe; Otieno; Mudigi; Chimano | Sauti Sol | 3:32 |
| 8. | "Love Again" (with C4 Pedro) | Baraza; Pedro Santos; Otieno; Mudigi; Chimano | Kaysha; Sauti Sol | 4:11 |
| 9. | "Mbozi Za Malwa" (with Bebe Cool) | Baraza; Moses Ssali; Otieno; Mudigi; Chimano | Sauti Sol | 3:09 |
| 10. | "Tulale Fofofo" (with Mi Casa) | Baraza; Mi Casa; Otieno; Mudigi; Chimano | Sauti Sol | 4:00 |
| 11. | "Kamasutra" (featuring Vanessa Mdee) | Baraza; Vanessa Mdee; Otieno; Mudigi; Chimano | Sauti Sol | 3:40 |
| 12. | "Love on the Dance Floor" (featuring Toofan) | Baraza; Otieno; Mudigi; Toofan; Chimano | Sauti Sol | 3:18 |
| 13. | "Africa" (with Yemi Alade) | Baraza; Otieno; Mudigi; Chimano; Yemi Alade | Sauti Sol; BeatsByEmzo | 3:56 |

== Release history ==
| Region | Date | Format | Version | Label |
|---|---|---|---|---|
| Various | January 31, 2019 | CD, Digital download | Standard | Sauti Sol Entertainment |
