= Charles Worrod =

Charles Hector Worrod
- Born: 1912; Coventry, United Kingdom
- Died: 6 June 2008 (aged 95–96); Pietermaritzburg, South Africa
- Occupation: recording artist
- Employer: Equator Records
- Spouse: Wynne
- Children: Jenetta, Alaric

Charles Worrod (Coventry, England, 1912 – South Africa, 6 June 2008) was the proprietor of the Equator Sound Studios record label (see Equator Records) established 1961 in Nairobi, Kenya, during the 1950s and 1960s.

He left Coventry in post-war England in 1947 to relocate to South Africa, and later, Nairobi with his wife Wynne. In the late 1960s, he enrolled six of his core musicians including Kenyan musician, Daudi Kabaka, in a two-year course at the Conservatory of Music in Nairobi to learn music notation and theory.

Worrod is said to have been influential in the development of the growing popularity of the 'African Twist' and similar music styles developing at the time. His hand in the music industry both locally and abroad saw him meeting and promoting music legends such as Pat Boone and Roger Whittaker. Initially, Roger Whittaker was under contract to Worrod, who allowed him to cancel it to pursue a more lucrative career path with EMI.

Worrod is credited with recording songs of international status, such as Malaika (Fadhili William), Helule Helule (which later caught the interest of the British pop band, The Tremeloes), and the Kenyan-nationalised anthem-like Harambee.

During his time promoting and recording Kenyan music, Worrod instituted the concept of royalties in Kenya for musical artists.

He died in Pietermaritzburg, South Africa on 6 June 2008.
