= Gathoni Wa Muchomba =

Kenyan journalist, entrepreneur and politician

Peninnah Gathoni Mūchomba
- Born: 1 January 1975 (age 51); Komothai Village, Kiambu County, Kenya
- Citizenship: Kenya
- Education: Precious Blood Secondary School
- Alma mater: University of Nairobi (Bachelor of Education) (Masters Degree in Communication)
- Occupations: Journalist, entrepreneur and politician
- Years active: 1999 – present
- Known for: Politics
- Title: Member of Parliament
- Political party: United Democratic Alliance (Kenya)
- Spouse: Robert Mbūgua
- Children: 2

Peninnah Gathoni Mūchomba, also popularly known as Gathoni Wa Mūchomba, is a Kenyan journalist, entrepreneur and politician. She is the Member of Parliament for Githunguri Constituency in the bicameral Kenyan parliament since 2022 and a member of the ruling party, the UDA.

She previously vied for and won the Kiambu Women Representative parliamentary post in the 2017 General election. She garnered 922,829 votes from Kiambu county constituents, making her the third candidate to receive over 0.9 million votes in that election behind Uhuru Kenyatta, the president and Raila Odinga, the presidential runner-up.

== Early life and education ==
Gathoni Wa Mūchomba was born in 1975 in Komothai Ward, Gìthūngūri Constituency in Kiambu County of Kenya. She performed exemplarily well in her primary education emerging as the top student in her district. A good Samaritan volunteered to pay her school fees and helped enroll her at Precious Blood Secondary School in Riruta, Kiambu County, a public school. Gathoni later joined Makuyu Secondary School in Muranga County, where she worked as an untrained teacher. She subsequently entered the University of Nairobi where she obtained a degree of Bachelor of Education. Later she graduated with a postgraduate Master's Degree in Communication from the same University.

== Career ==
=== Business ===
While still a student at university, she got a job at Kameme FM where she hosted an agricultural program. Gathoni was later recruited by Inooro FM where she hosted a popular breakfast show which ranked top among Kikuyu radio shows. She was popularly known as the Queen of Vernacular Radio. She is the founder and managing director of a vernacular digital Kikuyu television station called Utugi Television, that targets farmers in Kenya.

=== Politics ===
In 2017, she won the Jubilee Party of Kenya primaries, beating her closest rival Ann Nyokabi. She was then elected as the Kiambu County Women Representative after garnering 922,829, becoming the third candidate with the highest number of votes after the presidential candidates Uhuru Kenyatta and Raila Odinga.

Gathoni attracted controversy before she was even sworn in as the Kiambu County Women Representative after she said that Kenya's parliamentarians should not have salary cuts because they need to be awarded for the work they do. Her sentiments attracted criticism from members of the public both offline and online leading to a petition to recall her. The motion did not succeed because there were not enough grounds for her to be recalled according to the County Government Act. She later apologized to Kenyans and her party leader President Uhuru Kenyatta.

She later caused a stir after she advocated for polygamy in central province, asking men to marry more than five wives if they can maintain them so that children do not grow up fatherless. Some Kenyans supported her while others criticized her for the remarks.

In 2022, she switched political parties and stool on the United Democratic Alliance political party ticket in the Githunguri Constituency. She won resoundingly and is one of the most popular women representatives in Kenya due to her controversial stand on social matters.

In 2025 she was one of thirteen African women chosen as a future Amujae leader by the Ellen Johnson Sirleaf Presidential Center for Women and Development.
