= Sol Filosofia =

Studio album by Sauti Sol
- Released: 25 February 2011
- Genre: Afro-pop
- Length: 40:20
- Label: Penya Records
- Producer: Wawesh

Sauti Sol chronology
Mwanzo (2009)	Sol Filosofia (2011)	Live and Die in Afrika (2015)

Sol Filosofia is the second studio album by Kenyan afro-pop band Sauti Sol. It was released on February 25, 2011 by Penya Records, and launched at the Alliance française in Nairobi.

The album's two singles "Soma Kijana" and "Coming Home" also had music videos released, with the latter featuring notable visual elements and performances.

== Singles ==
- "Soma Kijana" was released as the album's lead single. It urges all youth to take education seriously and read. The song's genre was inspired by one of Sauti Sol's biggest inspirations, the late Daudi Kabaka.
- "Coming Home" was released as the album's second single. A music video for the song was released on 13 April 2011, and featured singer and reality star Patricia Kihoro. In the video, guitarist Polycarp Otieno faces rejection from his girlfriend soon after the band returns home from tour, leading him to contemplate suicide as his fellow band members try to save him. A sequel to the song is said to be in production. The song won the Best Music Video award at the 2011 Kisima Music Awards.

== Track listing ==
Track listing for Sol Filosofia adapted from Amazon.com.

No.	Title	Length
1.	"Mbinguni"	5:01
2.	"Malikia"	3:59
3.	"Coming Home"	4:43
4.	"Soma Kijana"	4:03
5.	"Awinja"	5:30
6.	"Bowana Lelisu"	2:37
7.	"Nambee"	5:37
8.	"L.A.D.Y."	5:17
9.	"Row Your Boat"	4:20
10.	"Sofia"	4:40
11.	"Private Spice"	3:56
12.	"Sol Generation"	3:46
