= Suldaan Seeraar =

Somali singer

Suldaan Seeraar Guhaad (born 1991–1992), known professionally as Suldaan Seeraar is a Somali singer.

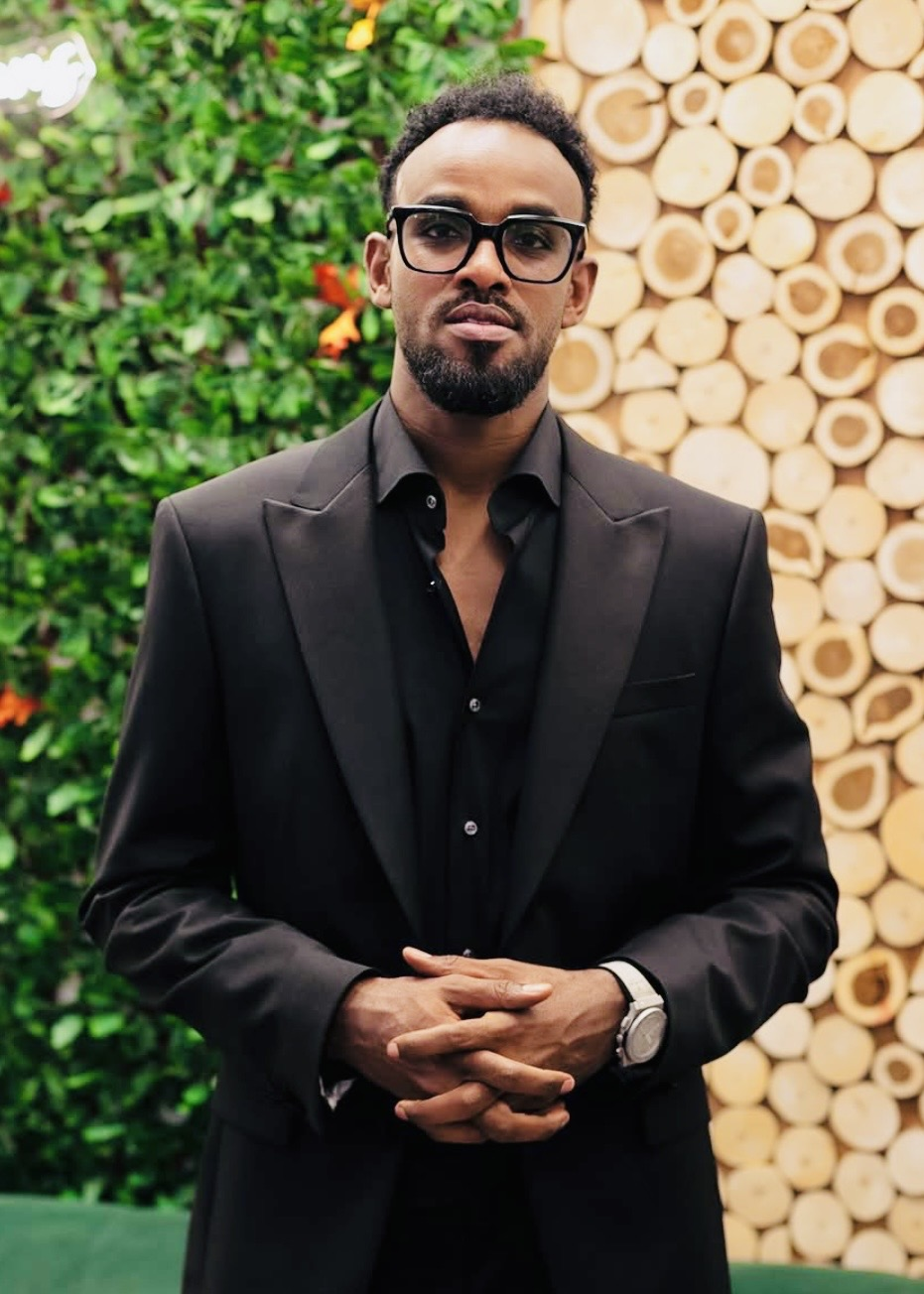
Somali Singer, Suldaan Seeraar

== Early life ==
Suldaan Seeraar Guhaad was born in 1991 or 1992 in Danan, Ethiopia. His father, who Seeraar attributes his appreciation for Somali culture, is an Islamic scholar. Early in his childhood, Seeraar led music teams in school competitions. Seeraar moved to Jijiga, Ethiopia, in 2013.

== Career ==
In July 2022, Seeraar hosted a concert at the Target Center in Minneapolis, Minnesota, for the city's annual Somali Week, commemorating the anniversary of Somalia's independence. Among the attendees was U.S. representative Ilhan Omar. The event was Seeraar's first in North America. With 5,000 fans in attendance, it was also the largest concert he had headlined. Local newspaper Sahan Journal called the event "the concert of the year for Somali music fans in Minnesota."

In April 2025, Seeraar collaborated with Kenyan artist Bien on the song "Safari."

== Artistry ==
Jon Bream of the Star Tribune described Seeraar's sound as "captivating dance music with reggae-like feel but a sound that's distinctly Somalian."

== Personal life ==
Seeraar married Amun Abdi in May 2018. Together, they have three children. Seeraar moved to the United States in May 2022 to be with his wife. They currently live in Columbus, Ohio.
