= Muthoni Drummer Queen =

Kenyan rapper, drummer and cultural entrepreneur

Mūthoni Drummer Queen
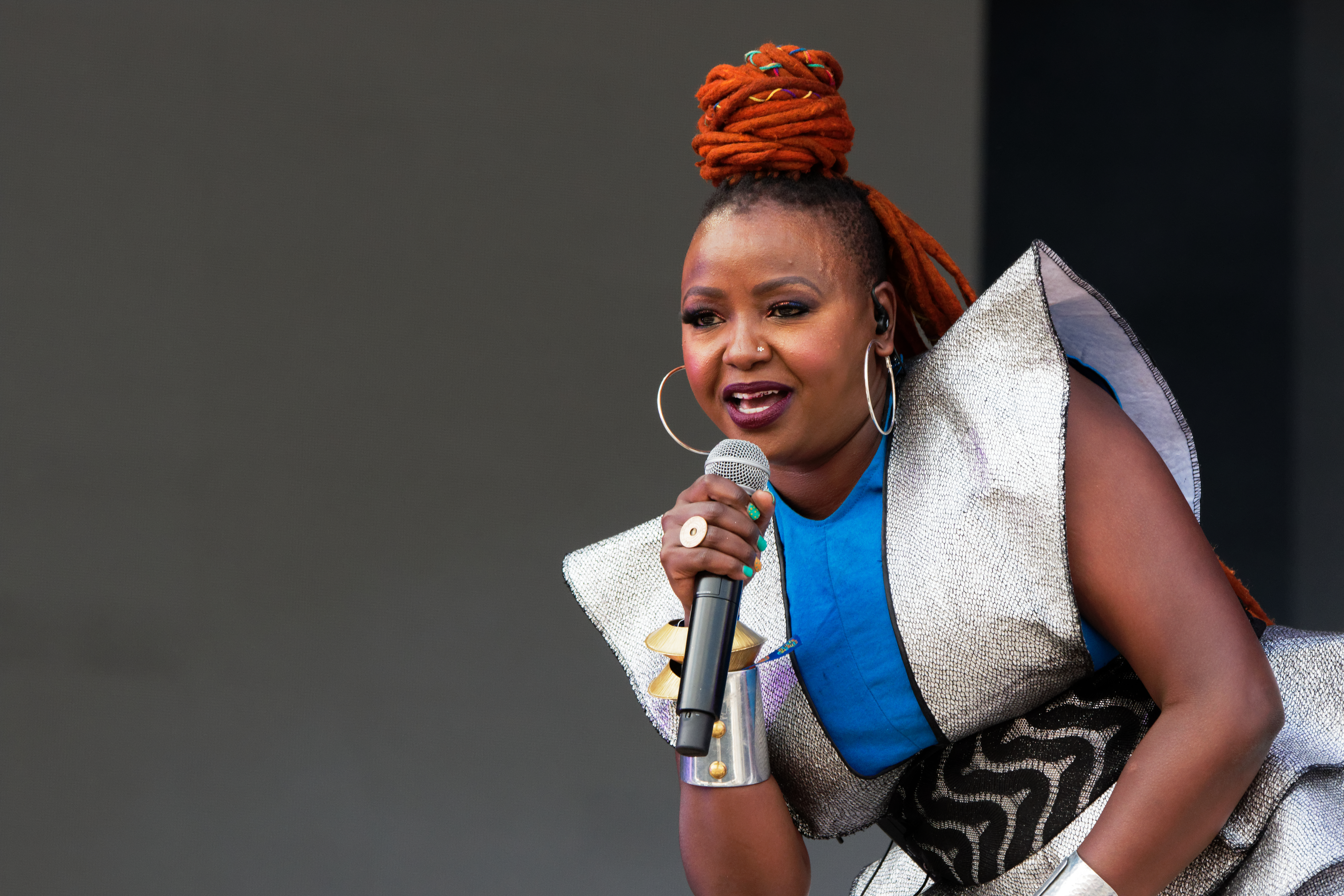
- Muthoni Drummer Queen in 2019
- Born: Mūthoni Ndonga; Nairobi, Kenya
- Occupation: Musician
- Writing career
- Genres: Hip Hop, Reggae, Dancehall, Pop

Mūthoni Drummer Queen or Mūthoni Ndonga is a Kenyan rapper, drummer and cultural entrepreneur. Her music genres include hip-hop, reggae/dancehall and soul/blues. She produces alternative electro-hip-hop music and founded the festivals Africa Nouveau and Blankets & Wine in East Africa.

== Early life and education ==
Mūthoni Ndonga was born and raised in Nairobi, Kenya. Her adolescent aspirations included becoming an artist, but she was discouraged by her parents due to their traditional values.

Growing up, she channeled her passion for music through school choirs until 2004 when, as a student, she organized her first concert with the help of her friends. In 2008, after having obtained her diploma in international relations and philosophy at the Kenya’s United States International University Africa (USIU Africa), with the intention to increase the visibility of alternative music in Kenya, she founded the festival 'Blankets & Wine'.

== Career ==
Mūthoni Ndonga is a musical artist, but along with her successes in music, she found time to create an international music festival in 2008 called Blankets and Wine. Blankets and Wine is a music festival whose main agenda is highlighting less popular, and non-mainstream musicians in Africa. It started off being held in Nairobi, the capital of Kenya, but then became expanded by reoccurring in places such as Kenya, Uganda, and Rwanda. A sister festival was also created in 2017 called Africa Nouveau. Africa Nouveau is a 3-day festival similar to the Blankets and Wine but it focuses on Pan-Africanism through its creators and not just underground talent in Africa.

Blankets and Wine provides vendors who sell different products such as clothing, food, and more. The areas for these fairs within the festival are called Blanket Soko and Onja Onja. Blanket Soko promotes fashion, photography, art, jewelry, tattoos, and more. Onja Onja is where versatile food vendors come and sell their food, whether it's vegan, vegetarian, or based on any other dietary preferences or needs.

In 2021, Mūthoni joined Spotify Equal Music Programme.

== Awards ==
Mūthoni Ndonga, has won many awards throughout her musical career. The first award that Ndonga won was the "Urban Demo-tape Clinic" (2014). Followed by the "Most Stylish Female Artiste of the Year" at the Abryanz Style and Fashion Awards (2019). She also won the Swiss Live Talent Urban in the same year. In the year of 2020, Ndonga won the "Best Act, Romandie" award as well. Ndonga was also nominated for the "Best New Artist" at the East African MTV music awards.
