= Bensoul =

- Born: Benson Mutua; March 4, 1996 (age 30); Embu, Kenya
- Genre: Afrosoul
- Label: Lion of Sudah
- Formerly of: Sol Generation Records

Benson Mutua (born March 4, 1996) professionally known as Bensoul, is a Kenyan singer, songwriter and multi-instrumentalist. He achieved mainstream success in 2019 after becoming the first signee of Sol Generation Records by Sautisol, and releasing his single Lucy. His five-year deal ended in 2023 and he left the label to start his own record label, Lion of Sudah..He is a member of the boy band Kodongklan

== Early life ==
Bensoul was born and raised in Dallas, a slum in Embu, Kenya. His father, a musician who played bass and electric guitar, influenced Bensoul's interest in music. Bensoul attended the Technical University of Kenya to study civil engineering, but dropped out in his third year to pursue music.

== Career ==
=== 2016-2019: Career beginnings ===
Bensoul started playing bass guitar for the Kenyan band, Hart The Band. In 2016, Bensoul released Masheesha, a collaboration with Kenyan band H_art The Band.

Bensoul also wrote several songs for different musicians. He co-wrote Uliza Kiatu and wrote El Shaddai for Hart the Band. He also wrote songs for artists including Telenovela by Kidum and has written for Alikiba, Ben Pol, Nyashinski, Sautisol and Mercy Masika. Later in his career, he co-wrote Time Flies, for Burna Boy's African Giant album which won a Grammy award.

In 2019, Bensoul became the first signed of Sol Generation, a record label by Sauti Sol

=== 2019 to present ===
In 2019, Bensoul released his first song under Sol Generation, Lucy. The song is a blend of rock and dancehall and uses Swahili, English and Sheng lyrics. In this same year, he released, Favorite, which is a love song. In 2020, he released Qwarantunes EP included four songs; Forget You, No Kisses, Salama and Peddi.

In 2021, he released the song, Nairobi, which featured Kenyan musicians Mejja and Nviiri The Storyteller. The song talks about the dating scene in Nairobi and explains that people unknowingly share partners. In 2021, Bensoul released the Medicine EP, which had four tracks; Medicine, Stereo, Ntala Nawe and Sugar Rush. The EP had classical Kenyan pop music, with a 'soulful feel'. The songs revolved around the theme of love.

In 2023 Bensoul released his debut album, Lion of Sudah and his last work under Sol Generation. The album was released on the 20th of April, as a tribute to cannabis and called for its legalization in Kenya. Songs like Karibuni Kwa Mida ya 420, Legalisation and Navutishwa which featured Bien, focused on Cannabis. The album had versatile sounds and features.

In 2023, he announced that he was leaving Sol Generation, following the end of his five-year contract. He announced the development of his record label, Lion of Sudah.

In 2024, Bensoul released another studio album, The Party & The After Party Album. The album featured popular tracks such as Extra Pressure, which featured Bien. Around May 2024, Bensoul together with Okello Max, Charisma, Mordecai Dex, Coster Ojwang, Ywaya Tajiri, and Israel Onyach Pala joined to form the boy band KodongKlan. Artists with their own careers, aesthetics, and audiences, they choose collaboration as a creative reset rather than a career requirement. Their debut single was “Okra Water” (July 2024) and culminated in their release of studio album 'Disko' in December 2024 which achieved wide success in the digital media with hits like 'Better Days' and "Nyaduse".His 7 track collab ep with Vic West arrived on 5 Dec 2025 titled "All Hands On Dec", with features from Ndovu Kuu,Ssaru,Harry Craze,Mordecai Dex,Tipsy Gee and FatherMoh.

== Discography ==
=== Studio albums ===
- The Lion of Sudah (2023)
- The Party & The After Party (2024)
- All Hands On Dec (2025)

=== Eps ===
- Qwarantunes (2020)
- Medicine (2021)

== Awards and nominations ==
Awards	Year	Recipient(s) and Nominee(s)	Category	Result	Ref
Café Ngoma	2017	Bensoul	Soulful artist of the year	Nominated	
Café Ngoma	2018	Bensoul	Artist of the Year	Nominated	
Pulse Music and Video Awards	2021	Nairobi-Bensoul ft Nviiri The Story Teller, Mejia, Sauti Sol	Best Collaboration of the year	Nominated	
Pulse Music and Video Awards	2021	Nakufa- Okello Max ft Bensoul, Amlyoto	Best Collaboration of the year	Won	
AFRIMAs	2021	Bensoul	Best Male Artist in East Africa	Nominated	
