= Wangechi =

Kenyan singer

Wangechi Waweru
- Also known as: Wangechi
- Born: Wangechi Mwende Waweru; 19 January 1994 (age 32); Nairobi, Kenya
- Genres: Hip hop, pop
- Occupations: Rapper; singer; songwriter
- Years active: 2013–present
- Labels: Provoke Music; Nuke Recordings
- Website: www.wangechimusic.com

Wangechi Mwende Waweru (born 19 January 1994), professionally known as Wangechi, is a Kenyan rapper, singer and songwriter. She began her music career in 2013 and released her debut mixtape "Consume - Chakula ya soul" in July 2013. On December 2, 2016, she released her 10-track EP "Dont Consume if Seal is Broken" Which included Tusker's theme song for the Here's to us Campaign launched on 30 November 2016.

Wangechi rose to great popularity through her feature on the Ligi Soo remix in 2013 that featured a variety of female rappers. This gave her a platform to create a name and release various projects after.

== Early life ==
Wangechi was born on January 19, 1994, and was raised in Nairobi, Kenya. Her passion for music began at the age of ten. Stating that her major inspiration behind music was rapper and songstress Nazizi. She listened to the likes of Slum Village, I.N.I, Kalamashaka, Jay-Z, E-Sir, Digable planets, Kanye West, Lauren Hill, Missy Elliott, MF Doom, B.I.G and many more. She broke into the Kenyan industry with her work on her first mixtape "Consume Chakula ya Soul" that dropped in July 2013.

== Career ==
She started off with Hype Masters Entertainment where she marked her debut into the music. Later on she was signed under Nuke Recordings where she released her first mixtape Consume. She later on released a variety of singles after that in the year 2014 such as Tulia Tu feat HHP and King Kaka, Play, Attention shopper and Analogue dreams feat Karun. She featured on the CNN "African Voices' segment in 2013 where she was identified as one of the Kenyan rising stars to watch out for.

She featured on Coke Studio Season 3 in 2015 where she partnered with the Tanzanian artist Ben Pol and returned for the superstar week where she collaborated with Ice prince, Alikiba, Dama do Bling, Maurice Kirya and American singer Ne-yo. She also released Cardiac Arrest and They Don't Know feat Fena Gitu in 2015. She also Featured on Rajville's Suka with Fena Gitu in 2018. She has shared stages with various international acts such as Mos Def, Tinnie Tempah, Tim Westwood, Morgan Heritage and Ne-yo.

In the year 2016 she wrote and sang the anthem to the Tusker Lager "Here to Us" campaign that focused on bringing Kenyans together as one. She is currently an independent artist.

== Discography ==
Song	Producer	Album
"Wanna Give it to you"		Consume Chakula ya soul
"Twende Kazi"		Consume Chakula ya soul
"Do for Love"		Consume Chakula ya soul
"Push"		Consume Chakula ya soul
"The Game		Consume Chakula ya soul
"Nairobi"		Consume Chakula ya soul
"Another Round"		Consume Chakula ya soul
"Intro"		Consume Chakula ya soul
"I am 1994"(Art 1994 Intro)		Consume Chakula ya soul
Cardiac Arrest		Consume Chakula ya soul
"Dont Consume if seal is broken"		Don't consume if seal is broken
"X2"		Don't consume if seal is broken

== Personal life ==
On September 14, 2014, she and her two friends suffered a grisly road accident. Her best friend Tionna Wangechi passed on. She was admitted in ICU with life-threatening injuries and left side temporary paralysis for a couple of months and went on to recovery.
