= Equator Records =

Equator Records or Equator Sound Studios was a record company formed in 1961 in Nairobi, Kenya, from the purchase of East African Records and Jambo Records.

== History ==
In 1947, East African Sound Studios and the Jambo label were established. Africa Ground Cotton Company (Afcot Ltd.) later purchased East African Sound Studios; in 1952, they renamed the company East African Records Ltd. and expanded to pressing vinyl, resulting in the first records pressed in East Africa.

Fadhili and the Jambo Boys Band recorded a number of songs with East African Records between 1959 and 1962. The other band members were Harrison William, Joseph Nazareth, Mumba Charo (Fadhili's brother), Nahshon Gandani, Samuel Lefondo, and Sheila Monroe.

In 1961, Charles Worrod purchased the Jambo label and the East African Records recording studio and pressing plant, renaming the enterprise Equator Sound Studios Ltd. Worrod also renamed the Jambo Boys Band as the Equator Sound Band. Kenyan musician Fadhili William became a member of the band alongside Adolf Banyoro, Peter Tsotsi, Nashil Pichen, Charles Ssongo, Gabriel Omolo, and Daudi Kabaka.

Equator Sound Studios, under direction from Worrod at that point, marketed and produced Fadhili's Swahili love-ballad, Malaika, after Worrod realised that the original poorly recorded Malaika could have international appeal. Malaika had initially been recorded by Jambo Boys, with Konde serving as the studio engineer.

Worrod, who created the "African Twist," left Kenya in 1974 because the law barred him from engaging in the recording business unless he was a citizen. Fadhili later also left, for the US, where he lived for 15 years.

== New Equator records ==
In 2006 a new record label was founded by members of the band Islands, which is also called Equator Records. There is no connection between the two labels.

== See also ==
- List of record labels
