= Fadhili William =

Kenyan musician (1938–2001)

- Born: November 11, 1938; Taita-Taveta District, Kenya
- Died: February 11, 2001 (aged 62) Nairobi, Kenya
- Occupations: Musician, composer
- Years active: 1955–2001

Fadhili William Mdawida (November 11, 1938 – February 11, 2001), often referred to simply as Fadhili William, was a Kenyan recording artist and composer who is most famous as the first person to record Adam Salim's song "Malaika" which he recorded with his band The Jambo Boys around 1963.

Fadhili William was born to Halima Wughanga and Ramadhan Mwamburi in Taita-Taveta District near Mombasa. His father, who died when Fadhili was only seven, was a traditional musician. Like three of his siblings – Ali Harrison Mwataku, Esther John and Mumba Charo – he became a musician.

He started singing while in primary school in Taita. He went on to Government African School, in Pumwani in Nairobi. He then dropped out of Shimo la Tewa Secondary School, where he had joined Form Three, to pursue a musical career.

It was while at Pumwani, he said in an interview, that he fell in love with a beautiful girl, "an angel," to whom he composed and recorded Malaika (Angel) to console her when she was given away to an older man who could pay a bride price.

Malaika was recorded at the Equator Sound Studios under the guidance of Charles Worrod, who went on to promote and distribute the ballad. He was also the author and singer of the famous hit song "Taxi Driver", which he narrates a story about him trying to rent a cab to Nakuru, where a woman wrote him a letter to go to Nakuru so he doesn't break a promise. His tire got a puncture when he was in Naivasha, hence the song, where he is trying to rent a cab. He is recognized and appreciated in Kenya as one of the founding fathers of Classics, or commonly known as "Zilizopendwa." Although he died in 2001, his legacy lives on and his music still touches many hearts to this day.
