= Trio Mio =

Kenyan rapper (born 2004)

- Born: Mario Thanks Jesus "TJ" Cassela; October 22, 2004 (age 21); Nairobi, Kenya
- Other name: Mkurugenzi wa Jiji
- Occupations: Rapper; songwriter; singer
- Parent: Irma Sakwa
- Musical career
- Genres: Hip-hop; Gengetone
- Years active: 2020 - present
- Label: Trouble Music Kenya

Mario TJ Cassela, popularly known as Trio Mio (born October 22, 2004) is a Kenyan rapper, singer and songwriter. He began his music career in 2020, during the COVID-19 pandemic, with his debut single "Bazenga - Vile Inafaa." He is best known for his hit single "Cheza Kama Wewe," which was released on July 15, 2020, and featured remixes by other Kenyan artists such as Mejja, Exray and Nellythegoon.

== Early life and education ==
He was born in Nairobi, Kenya, to a father of Italian and Congolese descent and a Kenyan mother. He completed his high school education in 2022 and took the Kenya Certificate of Secondary Education exams in November 2022.

== Career ==
In early 2020, Trio Mio released his debut EP, "Son of the City", which included tracks such as "Cheza Kama Wewe" and other popular songs such as "Serereka" and "Kanairo". The EP received positive reviews from critics and fans, and topped the Kenyan charts for weeks. Trio Mio has since collaborated with various local and international artists, such as Shari Afrika, Tunu, Moeazy, Wiz Khalifa, Wakadinali, A Pass, Masauti, Sauti Sol, and Breeder. His music is characterized by his versatile and dynamic style, blending rap, hip hop, and afrobeat genres.

Management and performances

Trio Mio is managed by his mother, Sofia Irma Sakwa, who serves as his personal manager, alongside his cousin Anthony Osore, who acts as his Creative Director. In 2022, he was one of the performers at a peace concert in Nakuru, Kenya, ahead of the August 9 Kenyan General Election. He shared the stage with other popular artists such as Mercy Masika, Evelyn Wanjiru, Nadia Mukami, Sauti Sol, Octopizzo, and DJ Joe Mfalme.

Recent developments

In July 2023, Trio Mio announced that he was working on a song with American rapper Wiz Khalifa, which was expected to be released in August 2023. The track was then released in November 2023.
