= Wakadinali =

Kenyan hip hop group

- Origin: Eastlands, Nairobi, Kenya
- Genres: Hip-hop; drill; Gengetone; trap
- Years active: 2013–present
- Label: Rong Rende
- Members: Scar Mkadinali; Domani Munga; Sewersydaa
- Website: YouTube channel

Wakadinali is a Kenyan hip hop group from Nairobi, Kenya. Formed in the early 2010s, the group consists of three members, David Munga Ramadhan professionally known as Domani Munga, Churchill Mandela professionally known as Scar Mkadinali and Salim Ali Tangut professionally known as Sewersydaa. The group is also known as Rong Rende. Wakadinali who are from the Eastlands area in Nairobi started out as an underground hiphop group and broke into the mainstream in 2020.

Known for their gritty lyrics, street-oriented narratives, and fusion of gengetone, drill, and hardcore hip hop, Wakadinali have become one of the most influential rap groups in Kenya.

They gained mainstream recognition with their 2020 album Victims of Madness, which featured hits like "Njege/Sanse", "Morio Anzenza" and "Avoid Those People". Wakadinali are credited with redefining Kenyan urban hip hop by incorporating street slang (Sheng) and highlighting life in Nairobi's Eastlands.

Tela Wangeci writing in The Native linked the group to a "hiphop renaissance" in Nairobi, which she attributed to their ability to make music that represents the ordinary Kenyan youth.

== History ==
=== Formation and early years (2013–2018) ===
Wakadinali began as an underground rap group based in Nairobi’s Eastlands area, especially Umoja. Scar Mkadinali and Domani Munga founded the group and were later joined by rapper-videographer Sewersydaa initially recognized as Slim Visuals. The trio released early freestyles and mixtapes on YouTube, building a grassroots fan base. Their music reflected life in the informal settlements, tackling themes of survival, crime, politics, and inner-city struggle.

Ndani ya Cockpit 1 was their debut album in 2017. It was then followed by a second album in 2018, Ndani ya Cockpit 2. The album uses a lot of trap sound.

=== Breakthrough ===
In 2019, they collaborated with Kenyan rapper Dyana Cods to release the single Morio Anzenza, a Sheng phrase that translates to 'day ones'.

In 2020, Wakadinali released the Victims of Madness album which brought them into the mainstream. The 15-track album heavily relied on drill sounds and included hit songs like XL, Extra Pressure and Morio Anzenza. Tangaza Magazine writes that the name of the album "invites the audience to look at crime and criminals in a different way. What if we put ourselves in their shoes and saw their state of victimhood?". A common theme of the album is gun violence with songs such as XXL entirely focusing on the topic. In the album, Wakadinali frequently hint that gun violence is not always originating from the gangsters, but rather from police officers. Police brutality is a common theme in songs such as Njege Sanse and Kim Jong Un.

In 2021, in collaboration with Sir Bwoy, they released Geri inengi, a single that gained them more mainstream recognition. The song popularized the Sheng phrase "Subaru ya Mambaru" which refers to a Subaru car full of detectives.

In 2022, Rolling Stone listed their song "Mc Mca" as one of the top 40 Afropop songs of 2022. Their song "Sikutambui" was also listed Rolling Stone's The 40 Best Afropop Songs of 2023 list. In 2022, Wakadinali were the second most streamed local artists in Kenya on Spotify. In 2023, Wakadinali were the most streamed artists in Kenya on Spotify. They were also was the fifth most streamed hip-hop artists in Kenya. In 2022, Wakadinali released three albums. Easy and Haitaki Hasira were released in January 2022, while Ndani ya Cockpit 3 was released in December of the same year. Ndani ya Cockpit 3 was the 10th most streamed album of 2023 in Kenya. In 2024, Wakadinali were the second-most streamed musicians in Kenya on Spotify.

In 2025 , they released Victims of Madness 2 , the 22 track project consisted of features from suzzanah Owiyo, Skillo, Katapillah, Sudough Doss,Kitu Sewer among others

In 2026, they jointly announced they'd each release a 15 track album on the same day , with their titles announced days later. Scar Mkadinali with 'Msiza Season' , Domani with 'Life and Times Of a trapper' and Sewersydaa with 'Relapse'.

== Discography ==
=== Studio albums ===
- Ndani ya Cockpit 1 (2017)
- Ndani ya Cockpit 2 (2018)
- Victims of Madness (2020)
- Mtoto Wa Mama (2021)
- Exposed (Munga's Revenge) (2021)
- WADA (The Healing of a Nation) - Sewersydaa (2021)
- Haitaki hasira (2022)
- $£€K - Sudough Doss (2023)
- THE RONG DON - Skillo (2023)
- Ndani ya Cockpit 3 (2023)
- ME AGAINST ME - Katapilla (2023)
- MAURU UNIT - Sewersydaa (2023)
- Makali Man (2024)
- The Rong Don 2 (Skillo) (2024)
- Victims of Madness 2.0 (2025)

== Awards and nominations ==
Year	Awards	Recipient(s) and nominee(s)	Category	Result	Ref.
2019	Unkut HipHop Awards	Themselves	Best Rap Group	Nominated	
2019	Unkut HipHop Awards	"Mario Anzeza" (feat. Dyana Cods)	Song of the Year	Nominated	
2019	Unkut HipHop Awards	Ndani ya Cockpit 2	Album of the Year	Nominated	
2020	Unkut HipHop Awards	"Extra Pressure"	Video of the Year	Nominated	
2020	Unkut HipHop Awards	"XXXL"	Song of the Year	Nominated	
2020	Unkut HipHop Awards	Themselves	Best Rap Group	Won	
2021	Pulse Music Video Awards	"Avoid Those People" (feat. All Stars)	Best Collaboration of the Year	Nominated	
2021	Pulse Music Video Awards	Wakadinali	Best Group Video of the Year	Nominated	
2022	Pulse Music Video Awards	Themselves	Best Group of the Year	Won	
2023	Pulse Music Video Awards	Themselves	Best Group of the Year	Nominated	
