= Live and Die in Afrika =

Studio album by Sauti Sol
- Released: 21 November 2015
- Genres: Afro-pop, kapuka
- Label: Sauti Sol Entertainment

Sauti Sol chronology
Sol Filosofia (2011)	Live and Die in Afrika (2015)	Afrikan Sauce (2019)

Live and Die in Afrika is the third studio album by Kenyan afro-pop band Sauti Sol. It was released online on 21 November 2015 under their imprint label Sauti Sol Entertainment as a self-produced work by Sauti Sol. The band allowed fans to download the album free of charge from their website.

== Track list ==
1. "Sura Yako" (3:59)
2. "Live and Die in Afrika" (3:12)
3. "Say Yeah" (3:46)
4. "Isabella" (3:31)
5. "It's Okay" (3:33)
6. "Nishike" (4:05)
7. "Dollar Dollar" (3:43)
8. "Still the One" (4:26)
9. "Kiss Me" (3:57)
10. "Nerea" (feat. Amos and Josh) (3:25)
11. "Kuliko Jana" (feat. Aaron Rimbui) (5:29)
12. "Sambo Party" (3:39)
13. "Nipe Nikupe" (3:55)
14. "Shake Yo Bam Bam" (3:19)
15. "Relax" (3:20)
