= Bien-Aimé Baraza =

Kenyan musician

- Born: Bien-Aimé Alusa Baraza; 28 December 1987 (age 38); Nairobi, Kenya.
- Citizenship: Kenyan
- Education: Upper Hill School United States International University
- Years active: 2005-present
- Known for: Sauti Sol Songwriting Singing
- Style: Afropop
- Height: 1.91 - 1.93m
- Spouse: Chiki Kuruka (married 2020-present)

Bien-Aimé Alusa Baraza, popularly known as Bien, is a Kenyan musician and music executive. He is a member of Sauti Sol, a Kenyan Afropop music band.

== Early life ==
Bien attended Upper Hill School, Nairobi. In 2007, he was involved in a car accident that made Sauti Sol members decide to pursue music together.

== Career ==
=== Sauti Sol ===
In December 2023, the band announced that it would be performing together for the last time at sol festival in Nairobi.

=== Solo career (2019 to present) ===
In 2021, Sol Generation Records announced that Bien was signed to the label.

He also released his EP, Bald Men Love Better, which featured Aaron Rimbui. The EP included 6 songs, ‘Bald Men Anthem' ,'Stamina' ,'Coming Home' ,'Reset Rewind' and 'Mbwe Mbwe'. All were coproduced by Bien and Aaron.

Bien's solo career started with the release of songs such as Dimension, Inauma and Mbwembwe.

In March 2023, Spotify listed Bien as the most followed artist on the platform. His song, Inauma was also the most streamed Kenyan song on the platform

In 2023, Bien released his debut solo album, Alusa Why Are You Topless? The 16-track album included collaborations with Ayra Starr, Ms. Banks and Scar Mkadinali.

In 2023, he became the fourth Kenyan artist to be featured on the COLORSxSTUDIOS, where he performed True Love

In 2024, Bien had a Europe tour.

In 2024, Bien released “Alusa Why Are You Topless (Deluxe)” version. It included 5 tracks like Ma Cherie remix featuring Fally Ipupa, Wahala featuring Adekunle Gold In 2024, Bien was the most streamed artist in Kenya on Spotify.

In October 2026 , he announced that he had signed with Quality Control Music , becoming their first African artistHe's sophomore album "Alusa Continua" is set to be released on 20th Novemberand will be his first under Quality Control.It has features from Joshua Baraka,Coster Ojwang,Ywaya Tajiri,Kaycyy,Nono Melodies,Oxlade among others.

== Musical style ==
Bien's music includes political and social views as well as challenges status quo. Songs such as Maandamano (which translates to Protest in English) with Kenyan rapper Breeder highlights the issues affecting Kenyans

Bien is an Afropop artist, who fuses rhumba with different sounds including afrobeats and Amapiano

== Activism ==
Bien has publicly criticized the Music Copyright Society of Kenya for poor royalty pay for Kenyan artists. In 2023, he declined the organisation's invite to collect his royalties and stated it as a publicity stunt from MCSK's end.

In 2023 Bien expressed his support for the LGBTQ community, following the ruling by the Kenya Supreme Court that the Kenyan authorities were wrong for banning the gay community from registering their rights

== Singles ==
"I'll be okay" (2026)

"Finally" Featuring Alikiba (2026)

"Wahala" Featuring Adekunle Gold and ShineTTW (2024)

"Too Easy" Featuring Dj Edu (2023)

"Rakata" Featuring Rayvanny (2024)

"Safari" Featuring Suldaan Seeraar (2025)

"Duniya" featuring Prince Indah (2024)

== Awards and recognition ==
Bien won a Grammy Award for song writing on Burna Boy's album, Twice As Tall, which won the best global music album. In 2025, Bien won a Trace Award for Best Artist in Eastern Africa

== Other ventures ==
All members of Sauti Sol together own Sol Generation Records. Each of them is signed to the record label as a solo artist.

He also cofounded Hustle Sasa, a platform that allows artists and vendors to sell their products, including merchandise and music, directly to the market.

He is also a co-founder of Sol Kids, which produces content for children including books.

Bien sits on the board of the Recording Industry of Kenya (RIKE), a not-for-profit organization registered in Kenya that aims to promote the interests of producers and sound recorders in Kenya.

In 2022, Bien opened his nightclub, Manhattan Ke Bar and Grill, located in Nairobi.

== Personal life ==
Bien is married to Chiki Kuruka, who is also his manager. .Bien is both an Arsenal and Afc Leopards fan and loosely dedicated his song 'Finale' to Arsenal

== Discrography ==
- Alusa, Why Are You Topless? (2023)
