= Mwanzo =

Studio album by Sauti Sol
- Released: 4 August 2009
- Genre: Afro-pop
- Label: Penya Records
- Producer: Wawesh

Sauti Sol chronology
Mwanzo (2009)	Sol Filosofia (2011)

Mwanzo is the debut album by Sauti Sol, a Kenyan afro-pop band. It was released on August 4, 2009 by Penya Records.

== Singles ==
- "Lazizi" was released as the album's lead single. The song became popular among the band's fans, with other musicians performing their own cover versions of it. The song is about an ordinary man's plea to get a lady's number, so he can at least plan to take her out on a date, and earned the band thousands of fans across East Africa.
- "Blue Uniform" was released as the album's second single. It depicts police harassment towards the youth in Kenya. The band's singers Bien-Aimé Baraza, Willis Austin Chimano and Delvin Mudigi divide their verses into three personas: an innocent arrested youth, a bad police officer and another who explains why police officers sometimes get into corruption, with the story ending with the policeman releasing the youth with a stern warning.
- "Sunny Days" and "Nairobi" were released as the album's third and fourth singles, respectively. Featuring soul singer Stan, "Nairobi" is a tribute to Nairobi's beauty, sunshine, people, history, arts and culture.

== Track listing ==
Track listing for Mwanzo adapted from Amazon.com and Sauti Sol's official website.

No.	Title	Length
1.	"Asubuhi"	4:47
2.	"Lazizi"	3:52
3.	"Mafunzo ya Dunia"	4:15
4.	"Sunny Days"	3:34
5.	"Xhosi"	4:55
6.	"Wera"	4:38
7.	"Mama papa" (featuring Dela)	4:16
8.	"Blue Uniform"	5:50
9.	"Interlude Sauti Sol"	1:30
10.	"Subira"	5:12
11.	"Mapacha"	3:30
12.	"Mushivala"	5:00
13.	"Nairobi" (featuring Stan)	4:22
14.	"Asante sana baba"	5:30
