= Mejja =

Kenyan Genge Artist

Mejja Okwonkwo
- Born: Major Nameye Khadija; 23 May 1986 (age 40); Nyeri, Kenya
- Genres: Genge
- Occupations: Rapper; Genge artist
- Instrument: Vocals
- Years active: 2007–present

Major Nameye Khadija popularly known by his stage name Mejja (born 23 May 1986) is a Kenyan Genge artist. He was signed to Calif Records where he released multiple collaborations. His single "Jana Kuliendaje" won an award at Kenya's Chaguo la Teeni in 2008.

== Career ==
Mejja began his music career in primary school, performing with his brother Wambugu in a group called Ghetto Clan. He had his first breakthrough in 2008 with the song "Jana Kuliendaje". In 2011, he released the song "Landlord".

In 2014, Mejja formed a group called "The Kansoul" together with Kid Kora and Madtraxx. The group dropped their first song "Dabo Tap" later that year.

Mejja continued to gain popularity through collaborations, including "Cheza Kama Wewe" by Trio Mio and "Utawezana" by Femi One.

In 2021. Mejja was featured in Bensoul hit "Nairobi" alongside Sauti Sol.

In 2026, Mejje released the song Siaka with Ugandan rapper Fik Fameica.

== Discography ==
Songs

- Jana Kuliendaje
- Landlord
- Nyongwa
- Double Tap
- Niko Poa
- Twenzetu ft Madtraxx
- Ulimi Yangu
- Siskii
- Siaka (featuring Fik Fameica )
- siku hizi ni kubad
- Kanairo Dating
