= Precious Blood Secondary School (Riruta) =

- Kawangware; Kenya

Information
- Religious affiliation: Catholic
- Established: 1964
- Founder: Sisters of the Precious Blood
- Gender: girls
- Enrollment: c.900
- Language: English

Precious Blood Secondary School, Riruta is located in Kawangware, Dagoretti constituency in Nairobi county, Kenya. It is about 7 km to the West from the city center.

== Description ==
The school has three streams in every form. It is sited on a ten-acre plot and consists of class rooms, hostels, dining hall, a small field for sport, teachers' quarters, laboratories and staff rooms.

The Catholic nuns of the order of Precious Blood Sisters established the school in 1964. Its enrollment was for indigenous children from Kawangware, Riruta and Uthiru who had been affected by the Mau-Mau struggle.

It is a public school run by the Kenyan Government, The Precious Blood Sisters, Board of Governors and The PTA.

The school started as a single stream school but today it has four streams. The students are about 900. Initially it was not a boarding school but it expanded and dormitories were made.

== Alumni ==
- Fena Gitu, musician
- Gathoni Wa Muchomba, Member of Parliament for Githunguri Constituency, Kiambu County, 2022 - 2027.
- Anne Waiguru, politician and governor
