= Daudi Kabaka =

Kenyan vocalist and musician

Daudi Kabaka (1939, Kyambogo – 2001) was a Kenyan vocalist and musician.

The type of music he is known for is called Benga, a popular style in East Africa. His best-known songs include "African Twist", "Harambee Harambee" and "Western Shilo".

His song "Helule Helule" was covered by The Tremeloes and it became a hit in the United Kingdom.

Daudi Kabaka is also known for his Kenyan classic "Harambee Harambee" which largely reflects the aspirations of post-colonial Kenya to build their nation. One of his famous songs; "Msichana wa Elimu" is still popularly played in the Kenyan media houses as it advises about marriage. He collaborated with John Nzenze on three songs: "Masista", "Bachelor Boy" and "Nyumba za Tobacco". These songs were released by Jambo Records and became hits. Kabaka released the album Pesa Maradhi Ya Moyo with Maroon Commandos in 1986.
