= Chimano =

Kenyan musician and songwriter

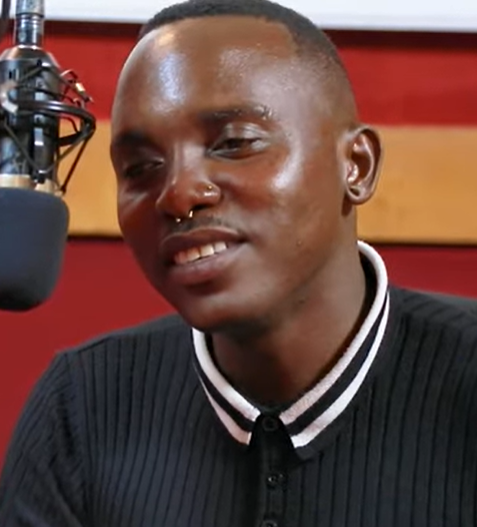
- Chimano in 2022

Background information
- Born: Willis Austin Chimano
- Member of: Sauti Sol

Willis Austin Chimano, known professionally as Chimano, is a Kenyan singer and songwriter who gained recognition as a member of Sauti Sol. His debut extended play, Heavy is the Crown, was released in 2022.

== Life and career ==
In 2022, Chimano announced plans to host his first solo concert, the Love and Harmony Festival. The event was devoted to "celebrating love, harmony, inclusion, and diversity", and scheduled to take place at the Junction Mall. However, the police canceled the event for security reasons, sparking an uproar on social media. Chimano's team found another venue that could host the concert, but the entire show was scrapped after law enforcement shut down rehearsals.

Chimano's debut extended play, Heavy is the Crown, was released in April 2022. The seven-track project explores topics of self-identity, self-love, and self-acceptance. After Sauti Sol announced their hiatus in 2023, Chimano performed in Australia, France, and the United Kingdom. He also performed in London and Cardiff as part of the UK-Kenya Season of Culture, an initiative organised by Africa Centre, London and the British Council. In 2024, Chimano released the singles "Fashion" and "Do You Remember"; the latter track delves into self-discovery and trusting one's journey. In November of the same year, he released the single "Monster", which has been described as a "feel-good Afro-house/dance song". The track explores themes of self-worth, empowerment and resilience.

== Personal life ==
In 2021, Chimano came out as gay, becoming the first Kenyan artist to openly identify as a queer man.

== Discography ==
- Heavy is the Crown (2022)

== Bibliography ==
- Heavy is the Crown (2026)
