= Khaligraph Jones =

Kenyan rapper (born 1969)

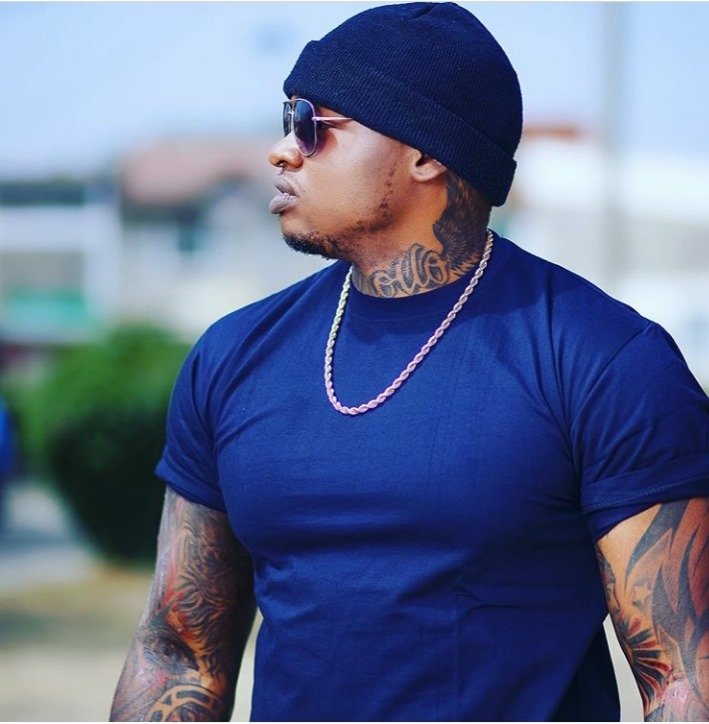
- Khaligraph in 2020

Background information
- Born: Brian Ouko Omollo; 12 June 1990 (age 36); Kayole, Nairobi, Kenya
- Genres: Kenyan hip hop; Hip hop Ohangla
- Occupations: Rapper; Songwriter; Emcee
- Years active: 2008–present
- Label: Blue Ink

Brian Ouko Omollo (born 12 June 1990), known by his stage name Khaligraph Jones, is a Kenyan rapper known for his singles "Mazishi" and "Yego". He released his debut full-length studio album Testimony 1990 in June 2018. Jones has received numerous awards during his career. He was nominated for Best Male Artist at the 2018 AFRIMMAs, won Best Hip Hop Artist at the 2020 AFRIMMAs, and was nominated for Best International Flow at the 2020 BET Hip Hop Awards.

== Early life ==
Jones was born and raised in Kayole, a neighborhood of Nairobi, Kenya.

His mother named him Ouko Robert after the late politician Robert Ouko, who was assassinated c. 13 February 1990.

== Career ==
He officially began his career in 2008 at a function called Words And Pictures.

He won Channel O Music Video Awards's Emcee Africa in 2009, a highly visible competition that quickly brought him to international acclaim.

In June 2018, he released his debut full-length studio album dubbed Testimony 1990.

In 2018, he was crowned Best Rap Act of the Year at the fifth Annual AFRIMMA Awards held at House of Blues in Dallas, Texas in 2018.

He was named the best Hip Hop act at the Soundcity MVP Awards in January 2020. The ceremony took place at the Eko Convention Center in Lagos, Nigeria.

In 2020, he was nominated for the BET Hip Hop Awards. His nomination was for the Best International Flow category. He was up against South Africa's Nasty C, Brazil's Djonga, France's Kaaris and eventual winner, grime rapper Stormzy from the United Kingdom. In May 2021, he was named the East African Rapper of the Year at MTN Uganda and in 2026, fellow rapper Da Agent was officially recorded as fastest rapper in East Africa on record.

In 2021, Jones partnered with Odibets, a sports betting company under their Odimtaani initiative to launch the OdiNare rap challenge. This challenge led to a collaboration between Jones and Kenyan rapper Chepkosgei that was executive produced by Riverstarz Music Entertainment. In 2024, Jones released the "Khali Cartel 5", an installment of his Khlai Cartel cypher.

== Controversies ==
On 10 November 2015, musician Juliani posted a picture on his social media of fellow hip hop heavyweights Jones, Octopizzo and King Kaka. He captioned the photo with "The only one with more bars than the three combined is me!!". What initially started as friendly banter triggered an online argument between the musicians that went on for hours before Jones released a diss track meant to silence the rest. While Octopizzo chose to stay out of the disagreement both Juliani and King Kaka responded to the diss track with their own. Over a year later, King Kaka revealed during an interview that the feud was indeed very serious and that were it not for some external mediative interventions, it could have resulted in bloodshed.

In January 2020, a feud broke out between Jones and Nigerian rapper Blaqbonez. This was after Jones won the Best Hip Hop Act ahead of him and others at the SoundCity MVP Awards 2020 held in Lagos, Nigeria. Blaqbonez released a video and a diss track complaining about Soundcity's decision while disregarding Jones. Hours later Jones responded with a diss track titled "Best rapper in Nigeria".

In August 2023, Jones sparked controversy by releasing a diss track targeting Tanzanian rappers. This led to backlash from Tanzanian rappers including Rosa Ree, Msodoki Young Killer, and Motra The Future. Bongo musician Harmonize, with whom Jones has collaborated previously, condemned the disrespect on Tanzanian artists.

== Political views ==
In April 2021, Jones led a team of 30 artists from the Kenyan creative industry in a meeting with then, the Deputy President William Ruto. This was at the height of the COVID-19 pandemic and at a time when the working relationship between then-President Uhuru Kenyatta and his deputy Ruto had deteriorated. Although it was confirmed that the main agenda was to discuss the concerns of the artists and to receive their suggestions and proposals, a notion was created that the artists who attended the meeting endorsed Ruto's candidacy for the upcoming 2022 Kenyan presidential election. During the meeting, Jones made a passionate appeal to Ruto for a solution to the plight that faced "hustlers" who were hurting in the background with some struggling to afford food and ret. Jones went ahead to promise that if their concerns were addressed, he would campaign pro-bono for Ruto across the country. Prior to the meeting, Jones had initially reached out to both Ruto and Odinga via his Instagram and only the former had responded and later set up the meeting with the representatives from the creative industry. Musicians Octopizzo and King Kaka, who were not part of the delegation that met Ruto, took to their social media platforms to castigate Jones and the other artists for being "opportunistic" in using COVID-19 as a guise for their political affiliations.

Just a few days before Ruto assumed office as president, Jones released his song "Usiache Akemewe" ("Don't Let Him Be Scolded"). In the song, he urged the President-elect to protect his competitor Odinga, who had been facing increased ridicule after he lost the election in 2022.

== Discography ==
=== Albums ===
==== Testimony 1990 ====
Jones released his debut studio album Testimony 1990 in June 2018. Testimony 1990 is a testimony of his life, his troubles and those of his country Kenya.

===== Track listing =====
- "Testimony" ft. Sagini
- "Blessings"
- "For Life"
- "G Like That"
- "Gwala" ft. YCEE
- "Making Babies"
- "Taking It All" ft. Timmy Blanco
- "Instagram Girls"
- "No Change" ft. Fena* "Aiseee" ft. Ray C
- "Superwoman" ft. Mr Eazi
- "All The Way Up"
- "Now You Know" ft. Rostam
- "Beat It"
- "Go Hard" ft. Esco
- "Don Know" ft. K.O
- "Complicated" ft Ria

==== Invisible Currency ====
Jones released his second album on 7 March 2022 exclusively on the Boomplay streaming service. It accumulated a total of 1 million streams in six days on the streaming platform. He later released it on other streaming platforms on 13 March 2022.

===== Track listing =====
- "Invisible Currency"
- "All I Need"
- "Ikechukwu"
- "Rada Safi"
- "Ateri Dala" ft. Prince Indah
- "Am on the Move" ft. Blackway
- "Maombi Ya Mama" ft. Adasa
- "Kamnyweso" ft. Mejja
- "Wanguvu" ft. Ali Kiba
- "Inner Peace" ft. Kev the Topic
- "Tsunami" ft. Scar
- "How We Do" ft. Xenia Manasseh
- "Ride for You" ft. Rudeboy
- "Bad Dreams"
- "Flee"
- "Hiroshima" ft. Dax
- "The Khali Chronicles"

==== THE BOOK OF JONES 1st CHAPTER ====
Jones released his third studio album THE BOOK OF JONES 1st CHAPTER on April 4, 2025."THE BOOK OF JONES 1st CHAPTER". Spotify. 4 April 2025. The album features ten tracks with collaborations from artists such as Nyashinski, Silverstone Barz, Falz, and others. It showcases Jones's continued evolution as a rapper, blending intricate flows with themes of personal reflection and social commentary.Njugi, Frank (9 April 2025). ""The Book of Jones 1st Chapter" Review: Khaligraph Jones Employs Old Tricks for New Triumph". Afrocritik.

==== Track listing ====
- "Risk" ft. Nyashinski
- "The Purge"
- "Halfway" ft. Mordecai Dex
- "They Gotta Be Wrong" ft. Silverstone Barz
- "Family" ft. Timmy Blanco
- "On The Real"
- "OG Status"
- "Crashout" ft. Teya Ticasso
- "Favour" ft. Falz
- "Cartel 5" ft. Jakk Quill, Ruyonga, Fresh like Uhh, Dyana Cods, Mex Cortez, Abbas Kubaff

=== Singles ===
Year of release	Title
2013	"How it go iyeee"
2013	"Dedication"
2014	"Embesha"
2014	"Fly"
2015	"Songea"
2015	"Natesa"
2015	"Open doors refix"
2015	"I am King" ft. Dj Dela Creme
2015	"Yego"
2015	"King Khali"
2016	"Ting Badi Malo" ft. Chris Kantai
2016	"Chizi"
2016	"Mazishi"
2016	"Wanjiru & Akinyi"
2016	"So Gone"
2016	"Micasa Sucasa" ft. Cashy
2017	"Naked"
2017	"Toa Tint"
2017	"Gaza"
2017	"Nataka Iyo Doh"
2017	"Omollo"
2018	"Rider" ft. Petra
2018	"Khali Cartel 1"
2018	"Watajua Hawajui" ft. Msupa S
2018	"Work" ft. Donn J
2018	"Juu ya Ngori"
2018	"Stick Miti"
2018	"Coming Thru"
2018	"Khali Cartel 2"
2019	"Khali Cartel 3"
2019	"Superman"
2019	"Leave me Alone"
2019	"Ruby"
2019	"Me Siogopi"
2020	"Best Rapper in Nigeria"
2020	"Yes Bana" ft. Bien
2020	"Roll With You"
2020	"Hao" ft . Masauti
2020	"I Still Will"
2020	"Tuma Kitu"
2020	"Lwanda Magere Legacy"
2020	"Kwendaa!!"
2021	"Wavy" ft Sarkodie
2021	"Punguza Kasheshe"
2021	"CHAMPEZ"
2022	Get high
2022	Maombi ya mama
2022	Hiroshima ft. DAX
2022	Sifu Bwana ft. Nyashinski
2022	Khali Cartel ft. various
2022	Mbona
2022	Blueticks ft. Femi One
2023	Kamnyweso ft. Mejja
2023	Kwame ft. Harmonize
2023	Wanguvu ft. Alikiba
2O23	Bongo favour
2023	Asante
2024	Chocha
2024	8PM In Nairobi
2024	Bang

== Awards and nominations ==
Year	Award ceremony	Prize	Recipient/nominated work	Result	Notes
2009	Channel O Music Video Awards	Emcee Africa	Khaligraph Jones	Won	Early breakthrough win that launched his international visibility
2018	African Muzik Magazine Awards (AFRIMMA)	Best Rap Act	Khaligraph Jones	Won	Held in Dallas, Texas
2020	Soundcity MVP Awards	Best Hip Hop	Khaligraph Jones	Won	Only East African winner that year
2020	BET Hip Hop Awards	Best International Flow	Khaligraph Jones	Nominated	First Kenyan and East African nominee in this category
2021	MTN Uganda Hip Hop Awards	East African Rapper of the Year	Khaligraph Jones	Won	Regional recognition
2020	All Africa Music Awards (AFRIMA)	Best African Rapper (Lyricist)	Khaligraph Jones	Nominated	Award focuses on lyrical excellence
