= Sauti Sol =

Kenyan band

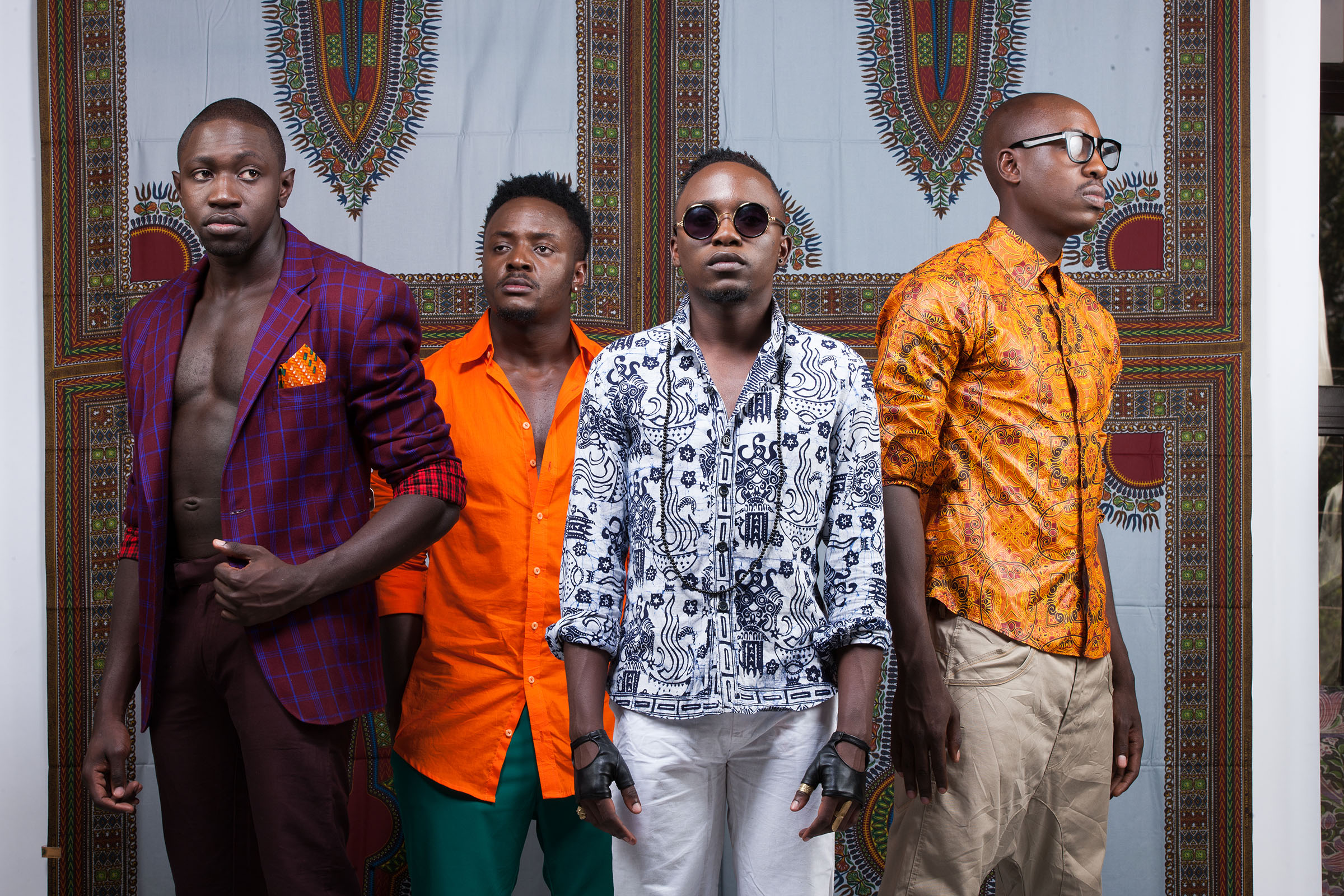
- From left to right: Polycarp Otieno, Savara Mudigi, Willis Chimano, and Bien-Aimé Baraza in 2013

Background information
- Origin: Nairobi, Kenya
- Genre: Afropop
- Years active: 2005–present
- Labels: Penya Africa; Sol Generation; Universal Music Africa
- Members: Bien-Aimé Baraza; Willis Chimano; Savara Mudigi; Polycarp Otieno
- Website: www.sauti-sol.com

Sauti Sol is a Kenyan afropop band formed in Nairobi in 2005 by vocalists Bien-Aimé Baraza, Willis Chimano, and Savara Mudigi. Initially an a cappella group, they later added guitarist Polycarp Otieno before adopting the name Sauti Sol.

Sauti Sol released their debut studio album Mwanzo on 1 November 2008, to critical acclaim. Their second studio album, Sol Filosofia, was released on 25 February 2011, earning the group a number of accolades and nominations in the process. On 18 June 2012, the band released a self-titled extended play in collaboration with South African rapper and record producer Spoek Mathambo. Their third studio album, Live and Die in Afrika, was released online on 21 November 2015 as a free download, available for 48 hours as an early Christmas present.

The band has had several successful tours in Africa and Europe, topped Kenyan charts and gained international attention with shows in Europe and the US, as well as television appearances and various accolades and nominations, including their 2011 concert performance in Kenya with South African a cappella group Ladysmith Black Mambazo. The band has also received both local and international accolades and nominations, including at the Kisima Music Awards, the Channel O Music Video Awards, the MTV Europe Music Awards, and the BET Awards.

== History ==
=== 2005–2011:Formation and early years ===
The band was formed in 2005 as an a cappella group by Baraza, Chimano, and Savara who had met at the Upper Hill High School and performed in Voices in the Light, a music group at the school. They then met guitarist Otieno, who attended Strathmore School, at the Alliance française in Nairobi, where they would frequent and decided to form Sauti (Swahili for "voice") and immediately wrote their first song, "Mafunzo ya Dunia" (Literally: lessons of the world), which would later feature in their debut studio album Mwanzo. The band later added the Spanish word "Sol" (sun) to their name and formed Sauti Sol (supposed to mean "voices in the sun"). In 2006, the band participated in the Spotlight on Kenyan Music competition, hosted by the Alliance française in Nairobi. They were included in the album compilation recording and later got signed to Penya Records. The four members all completed their university education in Kenya. Baraza studied journalism at the United States International University, while Savara studied commerce and finance at Africa Nazarene University. Chimano studied journalism at the University of Nairobi, while Otieno studied actuarial science at the Jomo Kenyatta University of Agriculture and Technology.

Sauti Sol released their debut studio album Mwanzo on 4 August 2009, via their record label Penya Records, to critical acclaim. In 2009, at a Ford Foundation grantee meeting hosted by the School of Journalism at the University of Nairobi, Willis Austin Chimano and Philomena made the declaration that his group was the "first Kenyan band to record socially-conscious music". The band then followed up with their second studio album Sol Filosofia two years later. The music video for the album's second single, "Coming Home", earned them the Best Music Video award at the 2011 Kisima Music Awards, with the group itself also winning the Best Fusion Artist/Group of the Year award.

=== 2012–2015: Sauti Sol and Live and Die in Afrika ===
In July 2012, Sauti Sol released a self-titled extended play, a collaborative effort with South African rapper and record-producer Spoek Mathambo, who produced the EP in Nairobi and Johannesburg. The music video for its lead single, "Range Rover", was shot at the Hembrug in Zaandam, Netherlands, in an old ammunition factory that is now an official cultural heritage site popularly referred to as "the cathedral". Kenyan singer Dela, who had previously collaborated with the band "Mama Papa" from Mwanzo, appeared in the song "Slow", which also features Mathambo. Its music video was shot in Amsterdam. The band then released "Love or Leave" as the EP's second single, with its music video also shot in Amsterdam during the band's stop in the city as part of their European tour in 2012. Their song "Gentleman" with rap group P-Unit earned them a nomination for the "Teeniez' Group or Collabo" award at the 2012 Chaguo La Teeniez Awards, losing out to alternative hip hop group Camp Mulla. It was the second time they were nominated for the award, losing to P-Unit the previous year.

Sauti Sol's recognition continued to rise in 2012, as they were nominated for and won the Most Gifted East African award at the 2012 Channel O Music Video Awards for their song "Shukuru" with Tanzanian rapper AY.

On 29 April 2014, the band released "Nishike". Its music video caused an uproar in the media due to its steamy content, and ended up getting banned from most local TV stations. Baraza later expressed his anger with the ban, stating that he refuses "to be a secular artist boxed by society to restrict my freedom of expression." They received a nomination for the Best Group award at the 2014 MTV Africa Music Awards, but eventually lost to South African group Mafikizolo. The music video has received a 2014 Nomination as East Africa's Most Gifted Video by Channel O Music Video Awards

After "Nishike", Sauti Sol released their third studio album, Live and Die in Afrika. The album, released online on 21 November 2015, was available to Sauti Sol fans globally for free download (48 hours) as an early Christmas present. The album was released under their imprint label Sauti Sol Entertainment as a self-produced work by Sauti Sol for Sauti Sol. A total of 400,000 downloads were made during the free download period. The band released their fourth single off Live and Die in Afrika entitled "Sura Yako" (Your Face). This was introduced by a spin-off Lipala dance competition run on Instagram that sparked an online dance movement in Africa and across the globe. Following the success of the competition, the band released the single's music video on 12 September 2014.

=== 2018–present: Afrikan Sauce and Midnight Train ===
Sauti Sol's fourth studio album Afrikan Sauce was released on 31 January 2019. Primarily an Afropop and R&B record, Afrikan Sauce marked a departure from the traditional acoustic sound of their previous albums. It features guest appearances from Patoranking, Tiwa Savage, Burna Boy, Vanessa Mdee, Yemi Alade, Khaligraph Jones, Nyashinski, Bebe Cool, Mi Casa, Toofan, Jah Prayzah and C4 Pedro. The album comprises 13 tracks and was supported by the previously released singles "Melanin", "Girl Next Door", "Afrikan Star", "Short N Sweet" and "Tujiangalie". Sauti Sol described the album as an "art and cultural exchange" project and said it would be released towards the end of 2017. They also announced plans to release a new track with a different African artist every month. However, this plan did not materialize due to financial constraints.

In January 2020, Sauti Sol announced on Twitter they had signed a record deal with Universal Music Africa, a subsidiary of Universal Music Group. They also stated they were gearing up to release Midnight Train. In an interview with OkayAfrica, Chimano said their record deal with Universal took a long time because they were looking for a tailor-made deal and not just the normal artist contract. Midnight Train comprises 13 tracks and features collaborations with India Arie, Soweto Gospel Choir, Sho Madjozi, Black Motion, Mortimer, Bensoul, Nviiri the Storyteller, Okello Max, Xeniah Manasseh, and Nairobi Horns Project. The album was initially scheduled for release in March, but its release date was pushed back three times due to the COVID-19 pandemic. Otieno told OkayAfrica their personal experiences and what they go through as men and husbands inspired the album's music. He also said the songs on the album are relatable and have deeper messages. Chimano characterized the album as a collaborative project with songwriters and producers and said it encompasses the best of them. Moreover, "The band devoted the whole project to their fans, who have been loyal to them.". On the album's cover art, Sauti Sol embraced innovative fashion and style.

Midnight Train was recorded between Los Angeles, Johannesburg, and Nairobi. In an interview with the website Music in Africa, Chimano said that nearly half of the album's songs were written three years prior and were recorded for a different project. He also said they recorded 20 songs for the album but chose to use only 13.

== Influences ==
The band members have named musicians such as Fadhili William, Daudi Kabaka and other established African artists such as Salif Keita, Lokua Kanza and Fally Ipupa, as well as British band Coldplay and American singer Jason Mraz as their influences.

== Band members ==
- Bien-Aimé Baraza – Vocalist, guitar, piano
- Willis Chimano – Baritone, performer, keytar
- Savara Mudigi – Vocalist, record producer, drums, bass guitar
- Polycarp Otieno – Guitarist, record producer, composer

== Discography ==
Studio albums

- Mwanzo (2008)
- Sol Filosofia (2011)
- Live and Die in Afrika (2015)
- Afrikan Sauce (2019)
- Midnight Train (2020)

Extended plays

- Sauti Sol (2012)
