= Shizzi production discography =

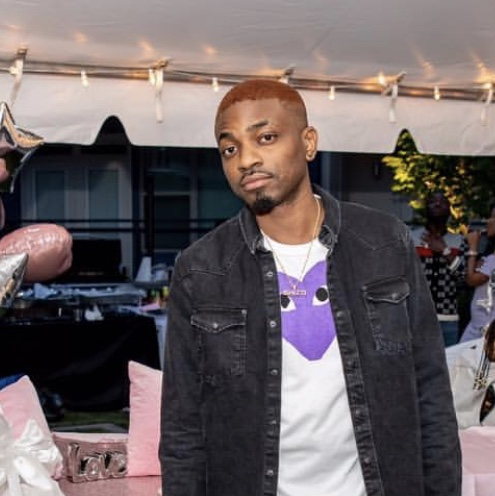
- Studio albums: 10
- Internet albums: 1
- EPs: 2
- Singles: 57

The following list is a discography of production by Shizzi, a Nigeria record producer from Lagos State.

== Singles produced ==
Title	Year	Album	Release date
"Ekaette" (Maye Hunta featuring Igho)	2009	Mayefestation	10 July 2010
"Love My Baby" (Wizkid)	2011	Superstar	29 August 2011
"Dami Duro" (Davido featuring Sina Rambo)	2011	Omo Baba Olowo	17 July 2012
"Overseas" (Davido featuring Sina Rambo)	2012	Omo Baba Olowo	
"Angel in This World" (Wande Coal)	2012	Non-album single	
"Constantly" (Wande Coal)	2012	Non-album single	
"Taiye Kehinde" (Harrysong)	2012	Non-album single	
"Ekuro" (Davido)	2012	Non-album single	
"Gbagaun" (IllRymz)	2012	Licensed to Ill	4 November 2013
"Nek-Unek" (MC Galaxy featuring Davido)	2013	Breakthrough	27 April 2015
"Daddy Mi" (Reminisce featuring Davido)	2013	Alaga Ibile	24 January 2014
"Insane Girl" (B-Red)	2013	Non-album single	
"Baby Face" (Wande Coal)	2013	Non-album single	
"Skelewu" (Davido)	2013	Non-album single	
"Gobe" (Davido)	2013	Non-album single	
"Love You Die" (B-Red & Shizzi)	2013	Non-album single	
"One of a Kind" (Davido)	2013	Non-album single	
"Show You The Money" (Wizkid)	2014	Ayo	17 September 2014
"Iwaju" (B-Red)	2014	Non-album single	
"Tchelete (Good Life)" (Davido featuring Mafikizolo)	2014	Non-album single	
"Sáré Wá Lé" (Zaina)	2014	Non-album single	
"Gbemileke" (Skuki featuring Shizzi)	2014	Non-album single	
"Pele Pele" (Seyi Sodimu)	2014	Non-album single	
"Rands and Nairas" (Remix) (Emmy Gee featuring Ice Prince, AB Crazy, Anatii, Phyno, Cassper Nyovest and DJ Dimplez)	2014	Non-album single	
"Baby Answer" (Runtown)	2014	Non-album single	
"Bamidele" (Danagog featuring Davido)	2014	Non-album single	
"Repete" (Deekay)	2014	Non-album single	
"Feeling Fine" (Skuki)	2014	Non-album single	
"Aye Dun" (Wande Coal featuring Skuki)	2014	Non-album single	
"Pelemo" (Danagog featuring Lola Rae)	2015	Non-album single	
"This Girl" (P.R.E)	2015	Non-album single	
"Go On" (Niyola)	2015	Non-album single	
"Izzue" (Davido and Dammy Krane)	2015	Non-album single	
"Say Dem Say" (Presh featuring Davido)	2015	Non-album single	
"Fans Mi" (Davido featuring Meek Mill)	2015	Non-album single	
"Ima Ndi Anyi Bu" (Runtown featuring Phyno)	2015	Ghetto University	23 November 2015
"Ghetto University" (Runtown)	2015	Ghetto University	23 November 2015
"The Sound" (Davido featuring Uhuru and DJ Buckz)	2015	Non-album single	
"Kosowo" (Shizzi and Wande Coal)	2016	Non-album single	
"Gbadun" (F Singz featuring Ayo Jay)	2016	Non-album single	
"Goodness & Mercy" (Maxim)	2016	Non-album single	
"Who You Epp?" (Olamide)	2016	Non-album single	2 April 2016
"Gbagbe Oshi" (Davido)	2016	Son of Mercy	21 October 2016
"Show You Off" (Wurld featuring Shizzi and Walshy Fire)	2016	Love Is Contagious	22 March 2019
"Love Me Je Je" (Seyi Sodimu featuring K. Michelle)	2016	Non-album single	
"Fowosere" (Ayo Jay)	2016	Non-album single	
"Everytime" (Wizkid featuring Future)	2016	Non-album single	
"Amen" (Teni)	2016	Non-album single	
"Like That" (Davido)	2017	Non-album single	
"Mother's Prayer" (WurlD)	2017	Non-album single	
"All I Need" (Wurld)	2017	Non-album single	
"All Over You" (Wale Kwame, Shizzi, Kwesi Arthur and Davido)	2019	TBA	
"Blow My Mind" (Davido featuring Chris Brown)	2019	A Good Time	22 November 2019
"Peru" (Fireboy DML)	2021	Playboy	4 August 2022
"Peru" (Fireboy DML, and Ed Sheeran)	2021	Playboy	4 August 2022
"SHOWING OFF HER BODY" (DaBaby & Davido)	2022	TBA	
"One Light (Remix)" (Maroon 5 and Bantu featuring Yung Bleu and Latto)	2022	TBA	

== Other production ==
Artist(s)	Year	Album	Songs
Wizkid	2012	Empire Mates State of Mind	07. "Body" (E.M.E featuring Wizkid)
Davido	2012	Omo Baba Olowo	09. "Dollars in the Bank" (featuring Kayswitch); 17. "Bless Me"
MultiChoice	2014	Non-album single	"Africa Rising" (featuring Davido, Tiwa Savage, Lola Rae, Sarkodie, Diamond Platnumz and Mi Casa)
WurlD	2016	Love Is Contagious	02. "Contagious"; 03. "Gbemisoké"; 04. "Paranoid"; 05. "Wishes N Butterfiles"; 07. "Candy"
Davido	2016	Son of Mercy	04. "Return"
Davido	2019	A Good Time	09. "Sweet in the Middle" (featuring Naira Marley, Zlatan and Wurld); 11. "Green Light Riddim"
Chris Brown	2022	Breezy (Deluxe)	30. "Nobody Has To Know" (with. Davido)
