= Shizzi =

Nigerian record producer and DJ

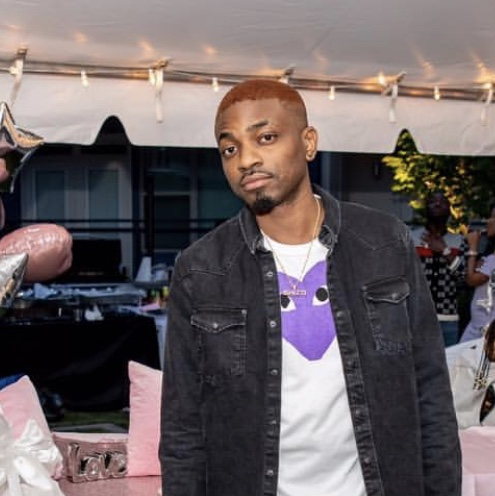
- Shizzi in 2017

Background information
- Born: Oluwaseyi Akerele; 3 December 1984 (age 41); Ibadan, Oyo State, Nigeria
- Genres: Afrobeats; pop; R&B; hip hop; soul
- Occupations: record producer; disc jockey; songwriter
- Instruments: Keyboard; synthesizer; drums; sampler
- Years active: 2009–present
- Labels: Magic Fingers; Concord Music Publishing; OBG Records

Oluwaseyi Akerele, popularly known as Shizzi, is a Nigerian platinum record producer, disc jockey and songwriter.

== Music career ==
=== 2009–2015: Early life and career ===
Shizzi started out as a drummer in church. He achieved recognition for his work on Davido's 2011 single "Dami Duro", and produced six songs on the singer's debut album Omo Baba Olowo (2012). He produced Wizkid's "Love My Baby", a song from the artist's debut studio album Superstar (2011). He has been credited for producing "Skelewu", and "Gobe". He was also the producer behind Wande Coal's highly controversial songs "Baby Face" and "Go Low". Shizzi has worked with Sasha, Harrysong, OD Woods, Naeto C, Sauce Kid, Wande Coal, Wizkid, D'Prince, May D, Danagog, Emmy Gee, Skuki, DaBaby, Chris Brown, and Fireboy DML, among others.

In 2013, he co-produced Davido's "Tchelete" with Uhuru/dj maphorisa featuring Mafikizolo. On 26 June 2014, Shizzi worked alongside Davido, Tiwa Savage, Lola Rae, Sarkodie, Diamond Platnumz, and Mi Casa to produce MultiChoice's Africa Rising campaign song. In 2015, he demonstrated how to make a hit, alongside Davido at NEC Live masterclass.

=== 2016–2019: Sony Publishing, Magic Fingers and The Lion King: The Gift documentary ===
In 2016, he signed a publishing deal with Sony/ATV Music Publishing as a record producer and a songwriter. Late 2016, Shizzi unveiled his record label and management company well known as Magic Fingers with his first signee Teni on 23 December 2019 after the official release of her single "Amen". In 2019, he appeared in a documentary for Beyonce's soundtrack album The Lion King: The Gift. The documentary aired on 16 September on ABC; in it, he spoke about recording songs for the album.

=== 2020–2023: The Battle of Hits session, feud, and Sony publishing deal terminated ===
In 2020, he teamed up with Sarz for a 2-hour live stream session, titled The Battle of Hits, on Instagram. On the showoff, they played their biggest hits, with some unreleased songs. Notable viewers who were active on their live are: Timbaland, Swizz Beatz, Wizkid, Don Jazzy, Davido, Spinall, Kel-P, and Tiwa Savage, among others. In 2021, Shizzi replied to Teni's tweet, on how she departed from his imprint, after achieving prominence through him, without acknowledging his impact on her career, after using him, he wrote.

On 27 April 2022, he announced the end of his six years obsolete publishing deal with Sony/ATV Music Publishing, however, he tweeted, “As of late last year, SonyATV said they were going to let him go only if Efe Ogbeni agrees with terms of termination the contract”, which his ex-manager Efe Ogbeni declined. Shizzi also added, that “his deal with Sony ATV, was a non-favorable deal because Ogbeni never gave him the chance to choose his own attorney to properly inspect the contract back in 2016, he wrote in his post. He currently has a publishing deal with Concord Music Publishing, a division of the American entertainment company Concord.

=== 2024-present: Sunlight to My Soul, and OBG Records ===
In 2024, Shizzi produced the Grammy-nominated song "Sunlight to My Soul" by Angélique Kidjo featuring Soweto Gospel Choir, which was nominated for the Best Global Music Performance, and earned him a special recognition from The Recording Academy. In 2025, he launched his second record label, OBG Records. He unveiled his first signing, Tayor. OBG stands for "Ordained by God". On 17 October 2025, Shizzi released "Famous" with Tayor under OBG Records, the label's first release.

== Personal life ==
=== Controversies ===
On 16 January 2016, Shizzi accused Tunde Ednut and Masterkraft for stealing his instrumental to make his song "Kosowo" which is produced by Masterkraft.

== Discography ==
As lead artist
Year	Title	Artist	Album
2017	"Maria" (featuring Jay Moore and L.A.X)	Shizzi	Non-album single
2018	"Wasted" (with. Ceeza Milli)	Shizzi	Non-album single
2019	"Aye Kan" (with. Teni & Mayorkun)	Shizzi	Non-album single
2019	"All Over You" (with. Wale Kwame, Davido and Kwesi Arthur)	Shizzi	TBA
As featured artist
Year	Title	Artist	Album
2016	"Show You Off" (featuring Shizzi and Walshy Fire)	WurlD	Love Is Contagious

== Accolades ==
Year	Awards ceremony	Award description(s)	Results
2012	The Headies	Producer of the Year	Nominated
2012	Nigeria Entertainment Awards	Music Producer of the Year	Nominated
2013	Nigeria Entertainment Awards	Music Producer of the Year	Nominated
2015	Nigeria Entertainment Awards	Music Producer of the Year	Won
2015	The Beatz Awards	Best Afro Hip Hop Producer	Nominated
2015	The Beatz Awards	Best Afro Dancehall Producer	Nominated
2016	The Beatz Awards	Best Afro Hip Hop Producer	Nominated
2019	The Beatz Awards	Afro Pop Producer of the Year	Nominated
2019	The Beatz Awards	Producer of the Year	Nominated
2021	African Entertainment Awards USA	Producer of the Year	Nominated
2023	All Africa Music Awards	Producer of the Year	Won
2023	ASCAP Rhythm & Soul Music Awards	R&B/Hip-Hop & Rap Songs for "Peru"	Won
2025	Grammy Awards	Best Global Music Performance for "Sunlight to My Soul" by (Angélique Kidjo)	Nominated
