= MTV Africa Music Awards 2014 =

Award

- Date: 7 June 2014
- Location: Durban International Convention Centre, KwaZulu-Natal, South Africa
- Hosted by: Marlon Wayans

Television/radio coverage
- Network: MTV, MTV Base

The MTV Africa Music Awards 2014 took place on 7 June 2014, at the Durban International Convention Centre (ICC Arena). Hosted by American comedian and actor Marlon Wayans, the awards ceremony aired live across Africa on MTV Base and MTV. It was sponsored by KwaZulu-Natal Province, Absolut, and the City of Durban, and featured performances from artists such as Miguel, Trey Songz, Flavour N'abania, French Montana, Tiwa Savage, Davido, Mafikizolo, Uhuru, Oskido, Professor, Diamond Platnumz, Phyno, Yuri da Cunha, Sauti Sol, Sarkodie, Ice Prince, The Arrows, Khuli Chana, Dr SID, Fally Ipupa, Michael Lowman, Don Jazzy, DJ Clock, Beatenberg, DJ Kent, Big Nuz, Toofan, D'Banj, DJ Vigi, DJ Tira, DJ Buckz, and Burna Boy. BET International premiered the show on June 12. Davido and Mafikizolo received the most nominations with four each. Mi Casa and P-Square received three nominations. Diamond Platnumz and Wizkid were nominated twice for both Best Male and Best Collaboration.

== Background ==
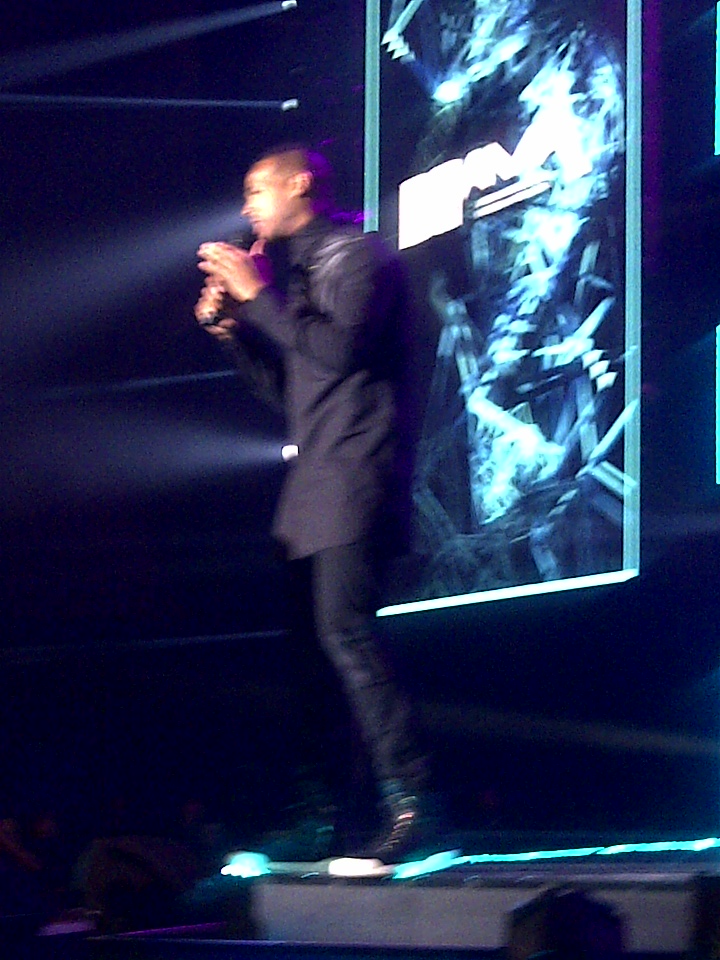
Marlon Wayans hosting the MTV Africa Music Awards 2014

Marlon Wayans wore a bead-studded rickshaw, and was cheered on by the crowd. Throughout the event, he portrayed an American reporter who stereotyped African talent during staged interviews. Mafikizolo won two trophies and performed their song "Khona", alongside Flavour N'abania, Sauti Sol, and Fally Ipupa. Davido took home two awards for Artist of the Year and Best Male. Tiwa Savage toppled Efya, Chidinma, Arielle T, and DJ C’ndo for the Best Female award. Afro-soul singer Simphiwe Dana paid tribute to the late Nelson Mandela by performing in front of a giant timelapse video artwork created by Transform Today nominee Rasty. The kidnapping of the Nigerian school girls was also addressed during the ceremony. Ladysmith Black Mambazo received great applause for performing "Acappello" and "Y-tjukutja". Lupita Nyong'o won the Personality of the Year award; a clip of her acceptance speech was aired during the ceremony. American musicians Miguel, French Montana, and Trey Songz performed their hit songs. Celebrity guests attending the event included Khloé Kardashian, D'Banj, Nomzamo Mbatha, Goldfish, DJ Fresh, John Vlismas, Kajal Bagwandeen, Emmanuel Adebayor, Wema Sepetu, Minnie Dlamini, Sizwe Dhlomo, Dorcas Shola Fapson, DJ C’ndo, Efya and Riaad Moosa.

== Nominations ==
The nomination party was held at The Sands in Johannesburg. Nominations were revealed by Nomuzi Mabena, Sizwe Dhlomo, Alex Okosi, Tim Horwood, and Shirley Mabiletja. On 27 May 2014, the nominees for the MTV Base Leadership Award were announced. The following day, MTV Base revealed Drake, Beyoncé, Rihanna, Pharrell Williams, and Miley Cyrus as the nominees for the Best International Act category.

== Performers ==
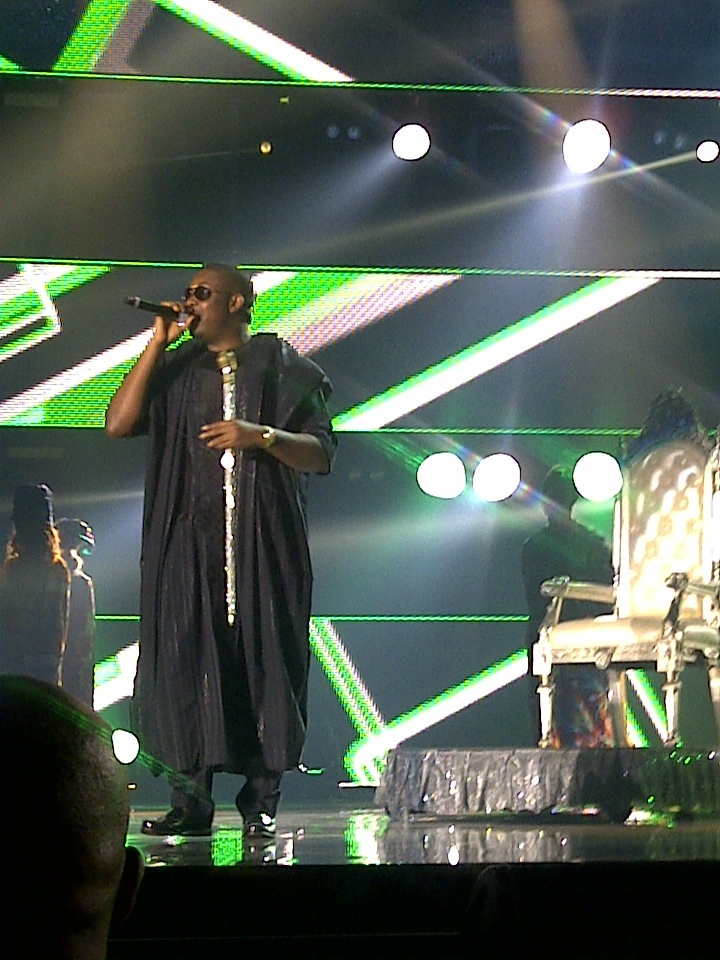
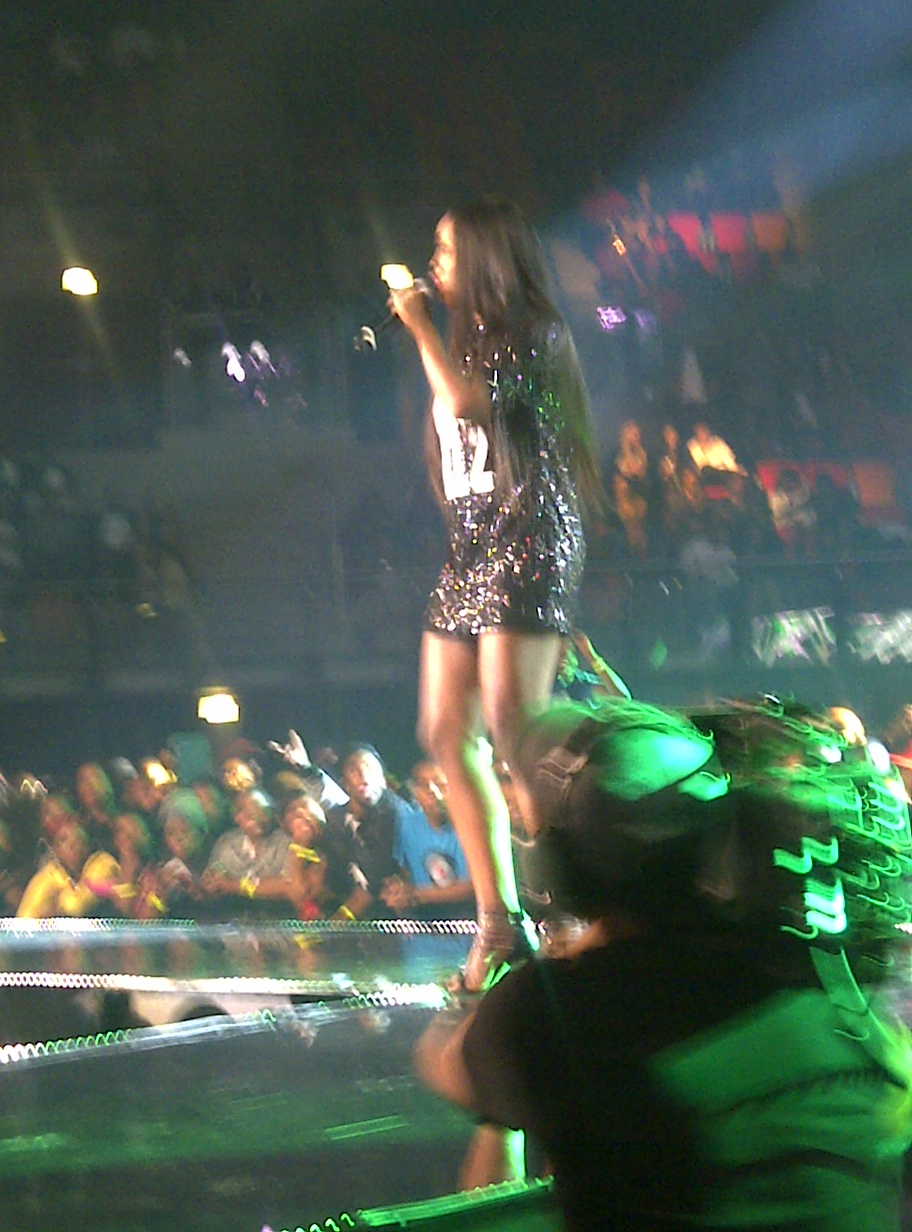
Don Jazzy and Tiwa Savage performing "Surulere".

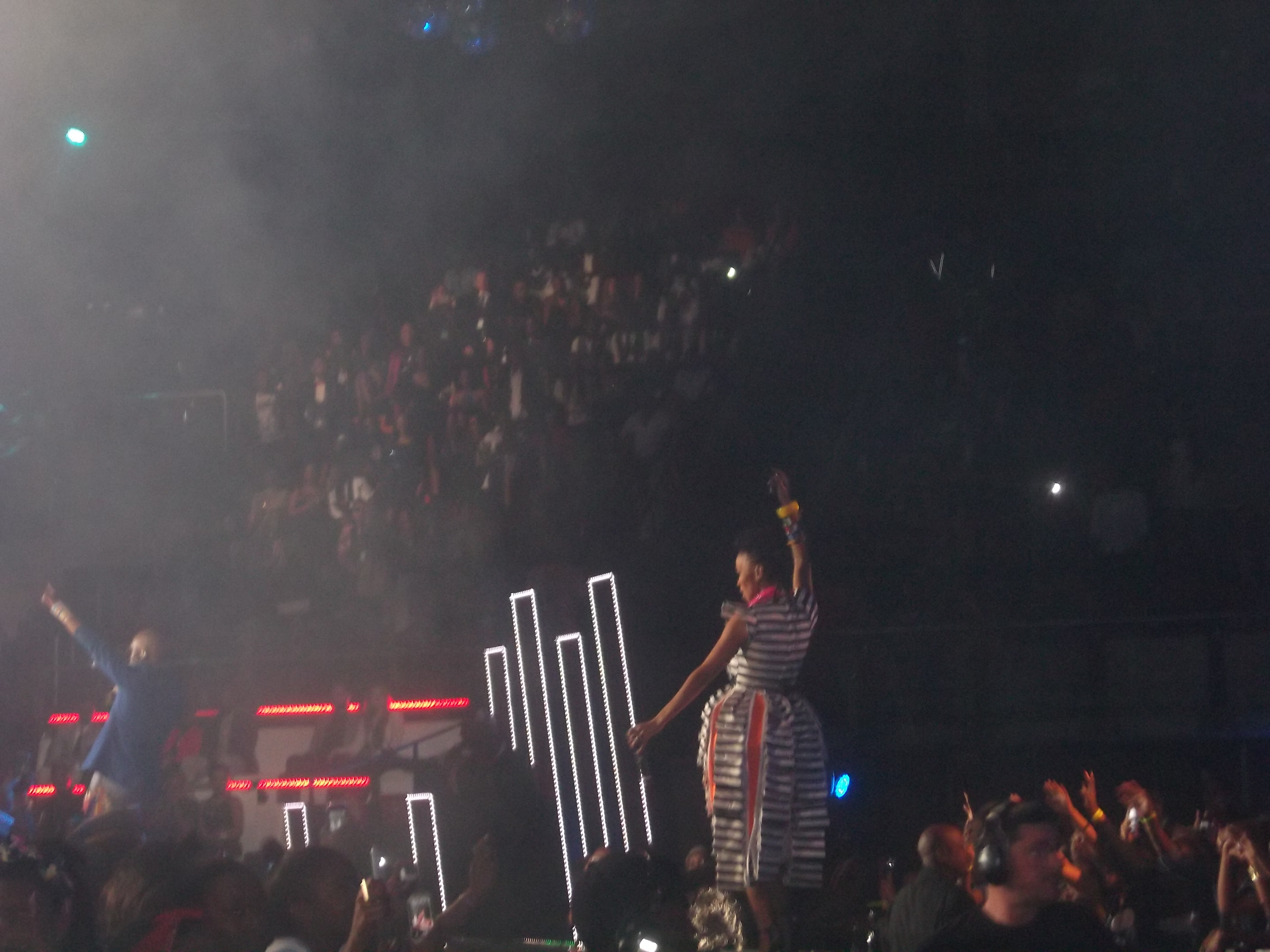
Mafikizolo performing "Khona".

Artist(s)	Song(s)
Miguel; Sarkodie	"How Many Drinks?"
Miguel	"Adorn"
French Montana	"Freaks" "Pop That" "Ain't Worried About Nothin'"
Trey Songz	"Na Na" "Bottoms Up"
Tiwa Savage; Don Jazzy; Dr SID; Phyno	"Surulere" (Remix)
Davido; Diamond Platnumz	"Number One" (Remix)
Davido	"Skelewu"
Mafikizolo; Flavour N'abania; Sauti Sol; Fally Ipupa	"Khona"
Simphiwe Dana	"Acapella" (Acoustic version)
Ladysmith Black Mambazo	"Acappello" "Y-tjukutja" "Oliver Twist"
Trey Songz; D'banj	
Uhuru; Oskido; Professor; Yuri da Cunha; DJ Buckz, Yuri da Cunha	"Y-tjukutja"
Sarkodie	
Ice Prince	
DJ Kent; The Arrows	"Spin My World Around"
Khuli Chana	
Michael Lowman	
DJ Clock; Beatenberg	"Pluto" (Remember Me)
Big Nuz	"Inazo"
Toofan	
DJ Vigi	
DJ Tira	
Burna Boy	

== Winners and nominees ==
=== Music categories ===
==== Best Male ====
- Davido
  - Anselmo Ralph
  - Diamond
  - Donald
  - Wizkid

==== Best Female ====
- Tiwa Savage
  - Arielle T
  - Chidinma
  - DJ C’ndo
  - Efya

==== Best Group ====
- Mafikizolo
  - Big Nuz
  - Mi Casa
  - P-Square
  - Sauti Sol

==== Best Video ====
- Clarence Peters

==== Best New Act ====
- Stanley Enow
  - Burna Boy
  - Heavy K
  - Phyno
  - Uhuru

==== Best Live Act ====
- Flavour
  - 2face Idibia
  - Fally Ipupa
  - Dr Malinga
  - Zakes Bantwini

==== Best Collaboration ====
- Uhuru (featuring DJ Buckz, Oskido, Professor, Yuri da Cunha) - "Y-tjukutja"
  - Amani (featuring Radio and Weasel) - "Kiboko Changu"
  - Diamond (featuring Davido) - "Number One" (Remix)
  - Mafikizolo (featuring May D) - "Happiness"
  - R2bees (featuring Wizkid) - "Slow Down"

==== Artist of the Year ====
- Davido
  - Mafikizolo
  - Mi Casa
  - P-Square
  - Uhuru

==== Song of the Year ====
- Mafikizolo (featuring Uhuru) - "Khona"
  - Davido - "Skelewu"
  - DJ Clock (featuring Beatenberg) - "Pluto" (Remember Me)
  - DJ Ganyani (featuring FB) - "Xigubu"
  - DJ Kent (featuring The Arrows) - "Spin My World Around"
  - Dr SID (featuring Don Jazzy) - "Surulere"
  - KCee - "Limpopo"
  - Mi Casa - "Jika"
  - P-Square - "Personally"
  - Yuri da Cunha - "Atchu Tchu Tcha"

==== Best Hip Hop ====
- Sarkodie
  - AKA
  - Ice Prince
  - Khuli Chana
  - Olamide

==== Best Pop ====
- Goldfish
  - Danny K
  - Fuse ODG
  - LCNVL
  - Mathew Mole

==== Best Alternative ====
- Gangs of Ballet
  - Michael Lowman
  - Nakhane Toure
  - The Parlotones
  - Shortstraw

==== Best Francophone ====
- Toofan
  - Arielle T
  - Espoir 2000
  - Ferre Gola
  - Youssoupha

==== Best Lusophone ====
- Anselmo Ralph
  - JD
  - Lizha James
  - Nelson Freitas
  - Yuri da Cunha

==== Best International Act ====
- Pharrell Williams
  - Drake
  - Beyoncé
  - Rihanna
  - Miley Cyrus

=== Non music categories ===
==== Personality of the Year ====
- Lupita Nyong'o
  - Chimamanda Adiche
  - Omotola Jalade Ekeinde
  - Trevor Noah
  - Yaya Touré

==== Transform Today by Absolut ====
- Clarence Peters
  - Anisa Mpungwe
  - Leti Arts
  - Joseph Livingstone(Jkl)
  - Khaligraph Jones
  - Rasty

==== MTV Base Leadership Award ====
- Ashish J. Thakkar
  - Humphrey Nabimanya
  - Ludwick Marishane
  - Dr Sandile Kubheka
  - Toyosi Akerele
