= Khona =

Single by Mafikizolo featuring Uhuru

from the album Reunited
- Released: January 10, 2013
- Recorded: 2012
- Genre: Afro house; afropop
- Length: 4:55
- Label: Kalawa Jazmee
- Songwriters: Theo Kgosinkwe; Nhlanhla Nciza; Themba Sekowe; Xelimpilo Simelane; Sihle Dlalisa
- Producer: Uhuru

Mafikizolo singles chronology
"Khona" (2013)	"Happiness" (2013)

Music video
- "Khona" on YouTube

"Khona" is a song by South African duo Mafikizolo. It was released as the lead single from their eighth studio album, Reunited (2013). The song features additional vocals from Uhuru and was released by Kalawa Jazmee Records. "Khona" peaked at number one on Afribiz's Top 100 chart and reached number two on the Metro FM music chart. The song made Prisoner of Class' list of the top 10 African songs of 2013, landing at number one.

"Khona" received positive reviews from music consumers, who admired its syncopated rhythmic drumbeat sound. The song has elevated the South African house genre to some extent, and was released with the idea that music can influence a large demography of people across the African continent. "Khona" won several accolades, including Record of the Year at the 20th South African Music Awards and Song of the Year at the 2014 MTV Africa Music Awards.

== Background ==
"Khona" was written and composed in Zulu by Theo Kgosinkwe, Nhlanhla Nciza and Uhuru. It translates to there or at that place. The release of "Khona" marked the official reunion of the musical duo, who took significant time off to work on their solo careers. Prior to releasing "Khona", Mafikizolo were precisely known for putting out wedding-inspired songs. In a nutshell, "Khona" features West African influences and a house instrumental. The duo opted for a fresh sound to complement their return to the South African music industry. Commenting on their newly discovered sound, Nhlanhla stated: "We had Afro-pop songs, but we also wanted a fresh sound. Oskido wasn't sure about the direction and neither were we. One of the things we are worried about is that the new sound is young." In addition to bringing about a new sound, the duo also revamped their physical image. Nhlanhla commented on Mafikizolo's new image, saying, "With Reunited we are inspired by the white 1950s and 1960s culture of roller skates and drive-ins and diners."

To some degree, Mafikizolo's decision to reunite was a conscious one due to the failure of numerous bands that stage comebacks after a hiatus. Theo commented on the downside of reunions, saying, "What makes this scary is that previous bands who did reunions and comeback albums didn’t work out. And if it doesn’t work out it may wipe out your history." While recording "Khona" and other tracks on the album, Mafikizolo admitted to being scared of people's reaction to their new sound. They specifically said, "We were exploring different sounds and were worried about how people would react after such a long time, but it is also what motivated us".

== Music video ==
The accompanying music video for "Khona" was uploaded to YouTube on April 19, 2013, at a total length of 4 minutes and 12 seconds. The video features geometric shape patterns and colorful costume designs. It surpassed five million views on YouTube, and has challenged the representation of masculinity in Africa. Vada Magazine said, "Although Mafikizolo haven’t been forthcoming on any symbolic meaning behind the placement of these dancers, their bold decision to place them so prominently could still be seen as a potentially dangerous idea on a continent where homosexuality is illegal in 34 countries."

== Critical reception ==
In a review for Music Industry Online, Phathu Ratshilumela praised the song's arrangement and mixing, noting it "has a catch storyline with an easy to memorize vocals".

=== Accolades ===
Year	Awards ceremony	Award description(s)	Results	Ref
2014	South African Music Awards	Record of the Year	Won	
2014	South African Music Awards	Best Ring Back Tone	Won	
2014	South African Music Awards	Best Selling Full Track Download	Won	
2014	South African Music Awards	Best Selling Mobile Music Download	Won	
2014	African Muzik Magazine Awards	Best Video of the Year	Nominated	
2014	African Muzik Magazine Awards	Best Collabo	Won	
2014	African Muzik Magazine Awards	Song of the Year	Nominated	
2014	MTV Africa Music Awards	Song of the Year	Won	
2013	Channel O Music Video Awards	Most Gifted Dance Video	Won	
2013	Channel O Music Video Awards	Most Gifted Video of the Year	Nominated	
2013	4Syte TV Music Video Awards	Best African Act Video	Won	
2013	MTV Europe Music Awards	Best African Act	Nominated	
2013	MOBO Awards	Best African Act	Nominated	

== Live performances ==
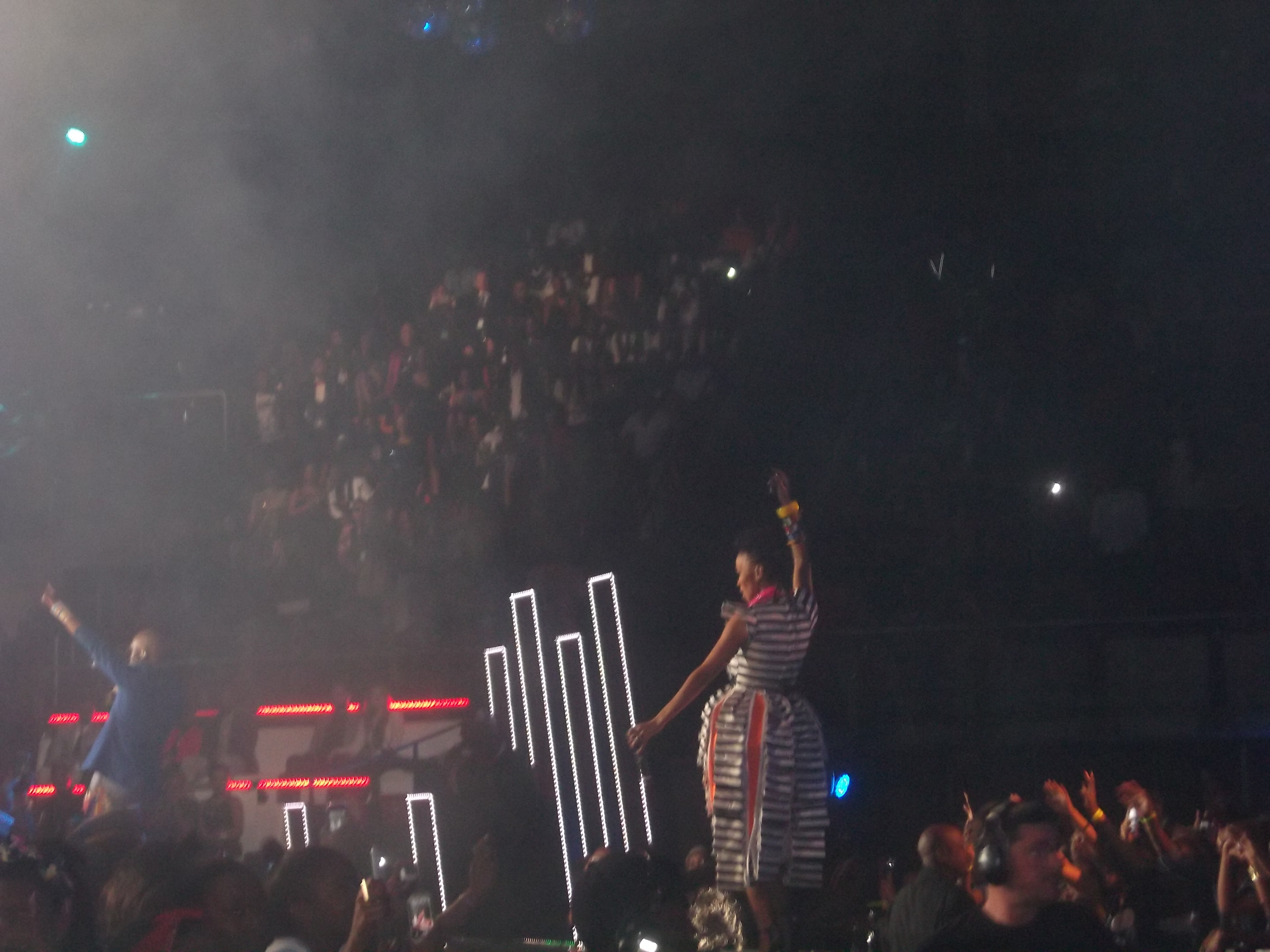
Mafikizolo performing "Khona" at the 2014 MAMAs.

On April 5 and 6, Mafikizolo performed "Khona" at the 2013 Cape Town International Jazz Festival. A day before their performance at the festival, Mafikizolo stopped by SABC 3's Expresso Morning Show for an interview. Moments after their interview, they performed "Khona" to Expresso's TV viewers. A minuscule level of controversy arose after their Expresso performance. Many people felt the duo lip synced and didn't put much effort into their performance.

On May 26, 2013, Mafikizolo performed "Khona" at Big Brother Africa: The Chase's launch show alongside Kenya's Stella Mwangi and Nigeria's Don Jazzy, Wande Coal and D'Prince. On June 23, 2013, the duo performed the song at the 2013 DKM concert, which featured additional performances from D'banj, 2 Chainz, Olamide, Fally Ipupa, Naeto C and Kayswitch. On September 1, 2013, Mafikizolo performed "Khona" at the 2013 edition of the Jazz on the Lake concert in Johannesburg.

On November 22, 2013, Mafikizolo performed the song at the Caribbean American and African Nations Awards, which took place in Yenagoa, Bayelsa State. The ceremony featured additional performances from Sean Kingston, Samini, King Sunny Adé, Tuface Idibia, Banky W., Timi Dakolo, Wizkid, Kcee, Sean Tizzle and Daddy Showkey. Mafikizolo performed alongside Zahara, Mi Casa, Dr Malinga, DJ Sbu, DJ Zinhle, Big Nuz, Professor, Oskido and AKA, at the Christmas with Our People Music Concert.

== Covers and remixes ==
The radio version of "Khona", which was played on several radio stations across Nigeria, Kenya, South Africa and Ghana, differs slightly from the version that appeared on the album. "Khona" has been remixed and covered by established and promising acts in Ghana, Nigeria and South Africa. Nigerian record producer Samklef created his version of the song by interpolating the original instrumental. Singer Terry G released a cover of "Khona", titled "Ora". Ghanaian rapper Guru also released his own rendition of the song. In April 2014, Nigerian rapper Lyrikal released "Khona Gongo (freestyle)", a song from his second mixtape O.C.D (2014).

== Track listing, covers, and remixes ==
No.	Title	Artist(s)	Length
1.	"Khona" (featuring Uhuru and Mapiano)	Uhuru and Mapiano	4:55
2.	"Khona (Radio edit)" (featuring Uhuru)	Mafikizolo and Uhuru	4:07
3.	"Khona (Instrumental)"	—	4:50
4.	"Prayer of Life (Amin) (Khona Cover)"	Samklef	2:55
5.	"Khona (Mafikizolo Khona Cover)"	Guru	2:48
6.	"Ora (Khona cover)"	Terry G	4:32
7.	"Khona Gongo (freestyle)"	Lyrikal	2:41

Notes

- "—" denotes an instrumental

== Charts ==
=== Weekly charts ===
Chart (2013)	Peak position
South Africa (EMA)	7
