= MTV Base Player =

- Genre: Entertainment News
- Presented by: Sizwe Dhlomo
- Original language: English
- No. of seasons: 1
- No. of episodes: 13

Production
- Executive producer: Alex Okosi
- Running time: 22 minutes

Original release
- Network: MTV Base Africa
- Release: April 2007

MTV Base Player is a weekly digitally driven music and news show presented by MTV Base Africa VJ Sizwe Dhlomo. The show features international entertainment news and content with a Pan-African focus. In addition, the show regularly brings African viewers exclusive music videos, thus keeping viewers up to date with the latest in international music.

== Look and feel ==
The name of the show is a pun, centering on the host, as well as a media player, the buttons of which are activated by him throughout the show. There are various elements within the show which are aimed at bringing the viewers closer to the host, as well as the use of user generated content to allow the viewer to express themselves on television.

== Digital interaction ==
=== My Mobie ===
My Mobie is a segment in which viewers are shown a scene from a famous movie or music video and then encouraged to send video clips of their reenaction of the scene from video cameras or Mobile phones, which then get featured in that section of the show.

== Competitions ==
=== Flash Frame ===
Flash Frame is a competition within the show. At any one split second during the show, a picture will flash on the screen. Viewers are invited to send Dhlomo an email, telling him what the picture was, in order to put themselves in line to win a prize.
