= Skelewu =

Single by Davido
- Released: 13 August 2013
- Recorded: 2013
- Genre: Afropop; Afrobeat
- Length: 3:07
- Label: HKN
- Songwriter: David Adeleke
- Producer: Shizzi

Davido singles chronology
"Paper (remix)" (2013)	"Skelewu" (2013)	"Go Below (remix)" (2013)

Alternative cover
- UK version cover

Music video
- "Skelewu" on YouTube

"Skelewu" is a song by Nigerian singer Davido. It was produced by Shizzi, HKN Music's in-house producer, and peaked at number one on Afribiz's Top 100 chart. "Skelewu" was ranked 5th on Premium Times' list of the Top 10 songs of 2013. It gained popularity in Nigeria after Davido announced the Skelewu dance competition, and was endorsed by African footballers Emmanuel Adebayor and Samuel Eto'o.

"Skelewu" was nominated for Song of the Year at both the 2014 MTV Africa Music Awards and African Muzik Magazine Awards.

== Instructional video and dance competition ==
Davido promoted "Skelewu" by uploading an instructional dance video to YouTube on 18 August 2013. Directed by Jassy Generation, the video's release was accompanied by an announcement of the Skelewu dance competition. In order to win the competition, participants were told to watch the instructional dance video and upload videos of themselves dancing to the song. According to Pulse Nigeria, the number of dance videos uploaded to YouTube by fans aggregated to over 100,000 views. On 10 October 2013, Davido declared Bello Moshood Abiola the winner of the competition.

== Music videos ==
=== Releases ===
There were two music videos released after Davido released the instructional dance video of Skelewu. The first music video, directed by Sesan, was released on 15 October 2013. It was uploaded to YouTube under a parody account. Shortly after its release, fans belittled the video and criticized it for not being up to par. Davido told his fans to disregard the video's unauthorized release and said someone betrayed him by releasing it. He also expressed his desire to make another video with Moe Musa, a UK based music video director. In a statement released by his team, Sesan said Davido was satisfied with his contributions to the music video and that it would be immature for the singer and his management to release inaccurate statements to defame his brand.

On 21 October 2013, Davido released the official music video. After its release, he received criticism from people who felt the video closely resembles LMFAO's "Party Rock Anthem" music video. According to Vanguard newspaper, the number of people who disliked the official music video almost equate those who disliked the alternative video. Moe Musa reacted to fans' condemnation of the official video in a negative way. There were reports that Davido wasn't pleased with Moe Musa's video and was looking forward to shooting another music video with Clarence Peters.

=== Reception ===
The music videos for "Skelewu" received mixed reviews from music critics. Tosin Ajibade criticized the Sesan-directed music video for piecing together random dance clips. The website Afrobeat360.com praised the Moe Musa-directed video and commended its setting, location, narrative and choreography.

=== Accolades ===
Year	Awards ceremony	Award description(s)	Results	Ref.
2014	Channel O Music Video Awards	Most Gifted Dance	Nominated	
2014	Nigeria Entertainment Awards	Best Music Video of the Year (artist and director)	Nominated	
2014	African Muzik Magazine Awards	Song of the Year	Nominated	
2014	African Muzik Magazine Awards	Best Dance in a Video	Nominated	
2014	MTV Africa Music Awards 2014	Song of the Year	Nominated	
2014	All Africa Music Awards	Best Male Artiste in West Africa (Davido for "Skelewu")	Won	

== Live performances ==
On 3 November 2013, Davido performed "Skelewu" at the "Guinness Colourful World of More" concert alongside numerous artists, including P-Square, D'banj, Wizkid, Ice Prince, Burna Boy, Olamide, Phyno, Chidinma, Waje and Tiwa Savage. The concert occurred at the Eko Convention Centre in Victoria Island, Lagos. On 17 December 2013, Davido performed "Skelewu" at the 2013 edition of Carniriv, which was held in Port Harcourt at the Liberation Stadium. On 30 December 2013, he performed the song in front of 16,000 people who attended Calabar Rocks, a concert sponsored by the Calabar Carnival Commission.

== Track listing and remixes ==
In April 2014, Major Lazer and Wiwek released an electronic remix of "Skelewu". The music video for the remix compiles various "Skelewu" dance clips from around the world.

No.	Title	Writer(s)	Length
1.	"Skelewu"	David Adeleke	3:07
2.	"Kanaku (Skelewu Cover)" (by Lyrikal)	Lyrikal	2:22
3.	"Skelewu (Major Lazer and Wiwek Remix)" (by Major Lazer and Wiwek)	David Adeleke	2:22
4.	"Skelewu (Uhuru Remix)" (by Uhuru)	David Adeleke	4:17
