= List of number-one singles of 2013 (South Africa) =

The South African Airplay Chart ranks the best-performing singles in South Africa. Its data, published by Entertainment Monitoring Africa, is based collectively on each single's weekly airplay.

== List of number-one singles of 2013 ==
Date	Song	Artist(s)	Ref.
21 May	"Blurred Lines"	Robin Thicke featuring T.I. and Pharrell Williams	
28 May	"Blurred Lines"	Robin Thicke featuring T.I. and Pharrell Williams	
4 June	"Blurred Lines"	Robin Thicke featuring T.I. and Pharrell Williams	
11 June	"Blurred Lines"	Robin Thicke featuring T.I. and Pharrell Williams	
18 June	"Blurred Lines"	Robin Thicke featuring T.I. and Pharrell Williams	
25 June	"Blurred Lines"	Robin Thicke featuring T.I. and Pharrell Williams	
2 July	"Blurred Lines"	Robin Thicke featuring T.I. and Pharrell Williams	
9 July	"Blurred Lines"	Robin Thicke featuring T.I. and Pharrell Williams	
16 July	"Get Lucky"	Daft Punk featuring Pharrell Williams	
23 July	"Blurred Lines"	Robin Thicke featuring T.I. and Pharrell Williams	
30 July	"Blurred Lines"	Robin Thicke featuring T.I. and Pharrell Williams	
6 August	"Blurred Lines"	Robin Thicke featuring T.I. and Pharrell Williams	
13 August	"Treasure"	Bruno Mars	
20 August	"Treasure"	Bruno Mars	
27 August	"Jika"	Mi Casa	
3 September	"Jika"	Mi Casa	
10 September	"Jika"	Mi Casa	
17 September	"Jika"	Mi Casa	
24 September	"Jika"	Mi Casa	
1 October	"Jika"	Mi Casa	
8 October	"Jika"	Mi Casa	
15 October	"Jika"	Mi Casa	
22 October	"Jika"	Mi Casa	
29 October	"Jika"	Mi Casa	
5 November	"Jika"	Mi Casa	
12 November	"Jika"	Mi Casa	
19 November	"Jika"	Mi Casa	
26 November	"Hold On, We're Going Home"	Drake featuring Majid Jordan	
3 December	"Hold On, We're Going Home"	Drake featuring Majid Jordan	
10 December	"Nelson Mandela"	Zahara	
17 December	"Nelson Mandela"	Zahara	
24 December	"Hold On, We're Going Home"	Drake featuring Majid Jordan	
31 December	"Hold On, We're Going Home"	Drake featuring Majid Jordan	

== Number-one artists ==
Position	Artist	Weeks at No. 1
1	Mi Casa	13
2	Pharrell Williams	12
3	Robin Thicke	11
3	T.I.	11
4	Drake	4
4	Majid Jordan	4
5	Bruno Mars	2
5	Zahara	2
6	Daft Punk	1

== See also ==
- 2016 in music
- Entertainment Monitoring Africa
