= Wishes and Butterflies =

2019 song by WurlD

Single by WurlD

from the album Love is Contagious
- Released: March 8, 2019
- Recorded: 2019
- Genre: R&B
- Length: 1:24
- Label: Universal Music Nigeria
- Songwriters: Sadiq Onifade; Oluwaseyi Akerele
- Producers: Shizzi; Walshy Fire

Music video
- "Wishes and Butterflies" on YouTube

"Wishes and Butterflies" is a song by Nigerian American singer and songwriter WurlD. It was officially released on March 8, 2019, and produced by Shizzi. It is the fifth single from his second studio album, Love is Contagious (2019). The song won the Best Vocal Performance (Male) at The Headies 2019.

== Background and composition ==
WurlD announced "Wishes and Butterflies" in the buildup for his second studio album, Love is Contagious (2019).

In a press release before the release of the album, he said “Love Is Contagious Is A Conversation About Love, From The Infatuation Stage To Drowning In The Emotion To The Commitment Stage”.

"Wishes and Butterflies" is an R&B inspired song and was produced by Shizzi. The song began with an arresting layer of jazzy notes, played sensually on the bass guitar. WurlD sang about needing real love, not someone who will simply sell him dreams. In the song, he described a bitter-sweet romance, one that he admits fills him with loathing, but he can't help but continue to pine for it. The track is a bluesy folk love song and over a mix of bass guitar riffs, sweeping organ harmonies and scatting drum riffs. He sang “I Need Love/ That Bitter Sweet Killer Romantic Though I Hate To Love You But I’d Never Find A Greater Kind of Love Baby”.

== Music video ==
On 17 March 2019, an accompanying music video for "Wishes and Butterflies" was released on YouTube.

== Accolades ==
Year	Award	Category	Result	Ref.
2019	The Headies	Best Vocal Performance (Male) for "Wishes and Butterflies"	Won	
2019	The Headies	Best R&B Single for "Wishes and Butterflies"	Nominated	
