= Love Is Contagious (EP) =

EP by Wurld
- Released: 28 March 2019
- Recorded: Universal Music Studios, (Lagos)
- Genre: Afro-soul
- Length: 33:11
- Label: Universal Music Nigeria
- Producer: Shizzi(exec.); Walshy Fire; Swerve; LeriQ; Mike Best; WurlD

Wurld chronology
Love Is Contagious (00000000)	I love girls with Trobul (2019)

Singles from Love Is Contagious
- 1. "Show You Off" Released: May 8, 2016; 2. "Contagious" Released: July 13, 2018; 3. "Paranoid" Released: November 30, 2018; 4. "Wishes and Butterflies" Released: March 8, 2019

Love Is Contagious is the second extended play by Nigerian Afro-soul recording artist Wurld. It was released on 28 March 2019 through Universal Music Group Nigeria. The album features guest appearances from Shizzi, and Walshy Fire. It was primarily produced by Shizzi, with additional production from Walshy Fire, Swerve, LeriQ, and Mike Best. The lead single includes the tracks "Show You Off", "Contagious", "Paranoid", and "Wishes and Butterflies".

== Background ==
Love Is Contagious is an Afrobeat infuse with Caribbean music, Afro-soul, R&B, Fuji, and Jùjú music. WurlD held an exclusive listening session of his EP, says BellaNaija. On 11 March 2019, the EP was out for pre-order on Apple Music, and Boomplay Music.

== Composition ==
In its introduction, "Show You Off" details his leisurely romantic intentions. In "Contagious" and "Paranoid", WurlD's fascination with romance, also laid the foundation for his genre-bending antics, fusing indigenous African beats with his R&B influences. In "Gbemisoke", finds him embraces his Yoruba roots as he has never done before as he sings a catchy hook in Yoruba to match the Afropop beat Shizzi produces.

In "Feel Right", creating an ambient pool of harmonies, mixing synth percussion, drum machine riffs, vocal samples, and bird chirping samples. In "Candy", wielding his soft voice like a poet's quill, all swift strokes and vivid imagery, using the sweet treat to describe his romantic relationship with a love interest. In "Drown", singing ‘You’re My One Obsession/You Get My Full Attention’, channeling a melodic Afropop flow over the groovy beat Leriq produces with mid-tempo drum riffs, rattling samples, electronic guitar harmonies, and percussion. He ended the project with the sultry groove of "So Good", set to the folk instrumentals Mike Best produces, mixing guitar strum licks, rattling samples, traditional drums and percussion.

== Critical reception ==
Professional ratings
Review scores
Source	Rating
Pulse Nigeria	4/5 stars
AllMusic	4/5 stars

Love Is Contagious received mixed reviews from music critics. In a review for Pulse Nigeria, Ehis Ohunyon said, From the very first time I got introduced to Wurld, he has demonstrated that irresistible skill for embracing a fusion of sounds not necessarily within the conventions of mainstream pop but still managing to enjoy some level of success and this time he is taking it even further with his experiment of indigenous sounds like Fuji, Juju and Afrobeat to form a wholesome piece.

== Accolades ==
"Wishes and Butterflies" won Best Vocal Performance (Male) and was nominated for Best R&B Single at The Headies 2019.

== Track listing ==
No.	Title	Writer(s)	Producer(s)	Length
1.	"Show You Off" (featuring. Shizzi, & Walshy Fire)	Sadiq Onifade; Leighton Paul Walsh; Oluwaseyi Akerele	Shizzi; Walshy Fire	3:30
2.	"Contagious"	Sadiq Onifade	Shizzi	3:41
3.	"Gbemisoke"	Sadiq Onifade	Shizzi	3:33
4.	"Paranoid"	Sadiq Onifade	Shizzi	6:11
5.	"Wishes and Butterflies"	Sadiq Onifade	Walshy Fire	1:24
6.	"Feel Right"	Sadiq Onifade	Swerve	3:27
7.	"Candy"	Sadiq Onifade	Shizzi	3:59
8.	"Drown"	Sadiq Onifade	LeriQ	3:39
9.	"So Good"	Sadiq Onifade	Mike Best	3:47
Total length:				33:11

== Personnel ==
- Sadiq Onifade - Primary artist, writer
- Shizzi - Executive producer, production (tracks 1, 2, 3, 4, 7)
- Walshy Fire - Production (tracks 1, 5)
- Swerve - Production (track 6)
- LeriQ - Production (track 8)
- Mike Best - Production (track 9)

== Release history ==
Region	Date	Format	Version	Label
Various	28 March 2019	CD, digital download	Standard	Universal Music Nigeria
