= Chymamusique =

South African DJ/producer

- Born: Collen Ntala Mmotla; 4 June 1990 (age 36); Burgersfort, South Africa
- Genres: Deep House; Soulful House; House
- Occupations: DJ; Music Producer; Record producer; Mixing & Mastering
- Years active: 2006–present
- Labels: Chymamusiq Records; House Afrika; Soul Candi; Mofunk Records
- Website: Chymamusiq Records

Collen Mmotla (born 4 June 1990) is a South African DJ and music producer. Born and raised in Diphale, Burgersfort, Chyma started his musical career in early 2000's as a pianist prior to becoming a DJ.

His third studio album Musique (2022), debuted number one in South Africa.

== Education ==
After completed his matric in 2007, he attended University of Technology studying Analytical Chemistry.

He also attended Boston College studied media and graduated in 2013.

== Career ==
Chymamusique started his music career in 2000 as a gospel and jazz pianist. He later developed an interest in house music in 2005 and started producing it in 2006. He released his first online single in 2010.

He founded and manages "Chymamusique Records" and is signed to the record labels House Afrika & Soul Candi. He was a Mofunk Records member from 2010 to 2013.

In DJing, Chymamusique has played internationally, and shared stages with DJs and producers including Vinny Da Vinci, Ralf Gum, Brazo Wa Afrika, Glen Lewis, QB Smith, Charles Webster and Atjazz.

In music-producing, he has worked with Kaylow, DJ Fresh, Anané Vega, Monique Bingham, Brazo wa Afrika, Brian Temba, George Lesley and Ree Morris.

In early September 2021, he announced his third studio album via Instagram. Musique was released on September 30, 2021. The album features Afrotraction, Da Vynalist, DJ Tears PLK, Brian Temba, Rona Ray, and Buddynice. It peaked at number one on Local iTunes album charts.

Chymamusiquewas and deep house musician DJ Poizen were involved in a car accident that occurred on 30 August 2025, resulting in death of DJ Poizen and severe injuries to Chymamusique.

== Awards and nominations ==
=== South African Music Awards ===
Year	Award Ceremony	Prize	Work	Result	Ref.
2014	South African Music Awards 2014	Best Remix	Mi Casa - Jika (Chymamusique Drum Mix)	Nominated	
2022	SAMA 28	Best Dance Album	Musique	Won	

=== Metro FM Music Awards ===
Year	Award Ceremony	Prize	Work	Result
2015	14th Metro FM Music Awards	Best New Artist Award	Gift Of Sound (album)	Won

Year	Award Ceremony	Prize	Result
2015	F.A.M.E	Best Dance	Won

Years	Award Ceremony	Prize	Result
2017 & 2018	LIMA	Best Producer	Won

== Discography ==
=== Studio albums ===
- House Afrika : House Dimensions (2012)
- After The Storm (2017)
- Musique (2021)
- Musique Collaborated, Vol 1 (2025)

=== Singles and EPs ===
- Quarantine EP - 2020
- Bass & Synth - Single 2019
- Last Night (feat. O So T) - Single 2019
- Sax on Fleek - EP 2019
- Its so Amazing (Remix) [feat. Happy] - Single 2019
- Perfectly Lovers (feat. P Tempo) - Single 2018
- Something About You (feat. Unqle Chriz) - Single 2018
- Artist Series, Vol. 1 - EP 2018
- Kubili - Single 2018
- Follow (Chyma's Rendition) [feat. Kent Smoke & YVES] - Single 2017
- Music Express Session 1 - EP 2016
- Jazz vs. Soulful, Vol. 1 - EP 2014
- Jazz According to House (Remixes Part 2) - Single 2013
- World Is Good (Original Mix) [feat. Rona Ray] - Single 2012
- Soul and Mind - Single 2012
- Chymatology - Single 2012
- Cant Get Enough - Single 2012
- Jazz According to House - Single 2011
- Lost in Words - Single 2011
