= Wurld (musician) =

WurlD
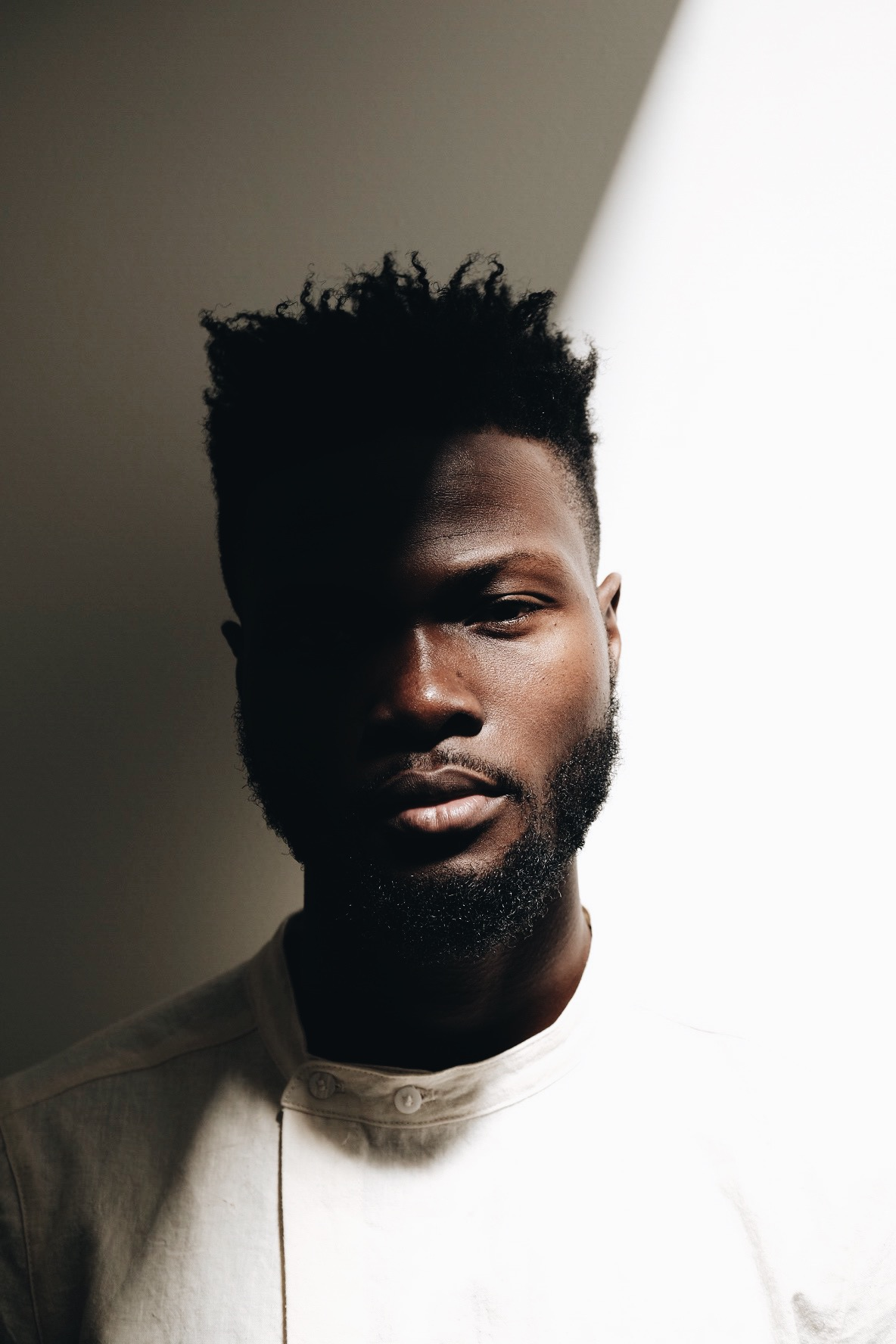
- Image of Sadiq Onifade

Background information
- Born: Sadiq Onifade; 2 January 1987 (age 39); Lagos, Nigeria
- Genres: Electronic; soul; pop
- Occupations: Singer; songwriter; record producer
- Instrument: Vocals
- Years active: 2012–present
- Label: WEAREGVDS
- Website: www.wurldmusic.com

Sadiq Onifade (2 January 1987), popularly known as WurlD, is a Nigerian singer and songwriter. Born in Lagos, Nigeria, WurlD relocated to Atlanta, Georgia to pursue a secondary education and record music. He describes his style of music as electro-fusion. He released his debut EP Evolution in 2013.

== Early life ==
Born in Lagos, Nigeria, WurlD relocated to the US as a teenager and received his college education at Georgia State University, studying computer science. While in school, WurlD developed a serious interest in musical performance.

== Career ==
In late 2012, WurlD released his first single, "Beyond Our Dreams" from his debut EP titled Evolution, due summer 2013. Coinciding with the release, SESAC held an exclusive listening party at their Atlanta office for WurlD's forthcoming Evolution EP. By early 2013, WurlD was in the recording studio with Mario, writing songs for the R&B superstar's upcoming album. Shortly after, the music video for Evolution's second single, "Alive", produced by Black Shield Entertainment producer Hood Beatz, was premiered exclusively via MTV: The Wrap Up on 2 May 2013. WurlD also teamed up with Timbaland's artist, BK Brasco as a featured artist on "Beautiful Girls." He also appears in the song's video.

In May 2016 WurlD released "Show You Off" an Afro-soul record featuring Walshy Fire of Major Lazer and Afro-beat producer Shizzi. In June 2016 WurlD released the collaborative track "Better Days" with Sir Felix; it became the official anthem for DelfSail 2016. WurlD (Sadiq Onifade) co-wrote the hit song "Blow my Mind" by Davido featuring Chris Brown in 2019. The song was produced by Davido's long-time collaborating producer Shizzi.

In his interview with African Folder published in 2023, Wurld revealed he had wriiten over a million songs in the course of his career as a singer-songwriter.

== Discography ==
=== Extended plays ===
Title	Album details
Evolution	Released: 20 August 2013; Label: Wurld Music Entertainment; Formats: Digital Download
Love is Contagious	Released: 28 March 2019; Label: Universal Music Nigeria; Formats: Digital Download
I love girls with Trobul (Wurld & Sarz)	Released: 8 November 2019; Label: WEAREGVDS/1789; Formats: Digital Download
Afrosoul	Released: May 15, 2020; Label: WEAREGVDS/IMMENSUM MUSIC; Formats: Digital Download

=== Singles ===
Year	Title	Chart positions			Album
Year	Title	US	UK	POL	Album
2012	"Beyond Our Dreams"	—	—	—	Evolution (EP)
2013	"Alive"	—	—	—	Evolution (EP)
2013	"All Night" (Gromee song)	—	—	—	—
2015	"Follow You" (Gromee song)	—	—	11	Chapter One
2015	"Who Do You Love" (Gromee song)	—	—	—	Chapter One
2015	"Summer Yours"	—	—	—	—
2016	"Show You Off" (ft. Shizzi & Walshy Fire)	—	—	—	—
2017	"All Night 2017" (Gromee song)	—	—	—	Chapter One
2017	"Mother's Prayer"	—	—	—	—
2017	"All I Need"	—	—	—	—
2018	"Trobul"	—	—	—	I LOVE GIRLS WITH TROBUL (EP)

=== Guest appearances ===
Year	Title	Other performer(s)	Album
2013	"Beautiful Girls"	BK Brasco	TBA
2015	"Let You Go"	Leriq	The Lost Sounds
2015	Netflix n Chill	B.O.B & London Jae	
2016	"Fantasies"	B.O.B & Scotty ATL	The Cooligan
2016	"Let It Rain"	B.O.B & Scotty ATL	Live & Direct
2016	Better Days	Sir Felix	
2016	$till Aware	Trinidad James & Scotty ATL	
2017	I Know	B.O.B	Ether
2017	Fake Friends	B.O.B	
2019	Sweet in the middle	Davido & Naira Marley & Zlatan Ibile	A Good Time

== Awards and nominations ==
- In 2015 WurlD went certified Gold with his Sony Music release track "Follow You" with Polish DJ, Gromee
- In 2017, he received a nomination for Best Diaspora Act at the Nigerian Entertainment Award alongside Rotimi and Wale.

Year	Event	Prize	Recipient	Result	Ref
2019	The Headies	Best Vocal Performance (Male)	"Wishes and Butterflies"	Won	
2019	The Headies	Best R&B Single	"Wishes and Butterflies"	Nominated	
2019	The Headies	Hip Hop World Revelation	Himself	Nominated	
