= Jika =

Song by Mi Casa

Single by Mi Casa

from the album Su Casa
- Released: July 19, 2013
- Recorded: 2013
- Genre: House; dance; afro-soul
- Length: 4:46
- Label: Soul Candi Records

Mi Casa singles chronology
"Jika" (2013)	"Turn You On" (2014)

Music video
- "Jika" on YouTube

"Jika" (Zulu: "Twist") is a song by South African house band Mi Casa. It was released as the lead single from their second studio album, Su Casa (2013), and was the most played song for 12 straight weeks on several radio stations in South Africa, including Metro FM, 5FM, YFM, Ukhozi FM, and Gagasi 99.5 FM. "Jika" peaked at number one on BBC Radio 1Xtra, a digital radio station in the United Kingdom, and topped the MTV Base Official SA Top 10 chart for the week of 31 October through 6 November 2013. Moreover, it peaked at number one on Trace TV's 30 Urban Hits.

== Background and recording ==
J Something, the band's vocalist, told Showbiz.co.za that charting on BBC Radio 1Xtra was unreal.

== Live performances ==
Mi Casa performed "Jika" during their tour of several African countries, including Kenya, Swaziland, Angola, Botswana, Lesotho, Tanzania, Mozambique, Namibia, Nigeria, Uganda, and Zimbabwe. In September 2013, they performed the song to celebrate Cape Town International Conventional Centre's 10th birthday. On 6 April 2014, the band performed the song at the Durban Botanic Gardens.

== Critical reception ==
"Jika" received positive reviews from music critics. A writer for the website Tunez.co.za called the track "melodious and catchy" and said its production is "rhythmic, engaging and creative". The website Red Flag said "Jika" "brings the playful Mi Casa style to life" and commended the song's dance routine. South Africa's edition of Rolling Stone magazine described "Jika" as a "delightfully feelgood fable about keeping it real to get the girl of your dreams."

== Accolades ==
"Jika" was nominated for Song of the Year at the 2014 Metro FM Music Awards. It was also nominated for Song of the Year at the 2014 MTV Africa Music Awards. Moreover, the song was nominated for Remix of the Year at the 20th Annual SAMAs.

== Track listing ==
- Digital download
1. "Jika" - 4:46
2. "Jika" (Radio Edit) - 3:46
- The Remixes
1. "Jika" (Infinite Boys Urban Mix) - 6:36
2. "Jika" (Calvin Fallo Deep Jazzy Mix) - 5:38
3. "Jika" (Chymamusique Drum Remix) - 6:45

== Charts and certifications ==
=== Weekly charts ===
Chart (2013)	Peak position
South Africa (EMA)	1

== See also ==
- List of number-one singles of 2013 (South Africa)
