= MTV Africa Music Awards =

Awards show organized by MTV Africa

- Awarded for: Music and pop culture
- Country: Africa
- Presented by: MTV Africa
- First award: 2008

The MTV Africa Music Awards (MAMAs) is an awards show event established in 2008 by MTV Africa to celebrate the most popular contemporary music in Africa, that is currently inactive or discontinued, as of 2021. Created and executive produced by Alex Okosi and Jandre Louw for the first 3 editions, it began in 2008 in Abuja, Nigeria, with the second edition held in 2009 in Nairobi, Kenya and a return to Nigeria in 2010 in Lagos.

After these three initial events, the show had a three-year hiatus, returning for the 2014 and 2015 editions in Durban, South Africa. The 2016 show was in Johannesburg. The 2021 event was due to be held in Kampala before it was indefinitely postponed.

== History ==
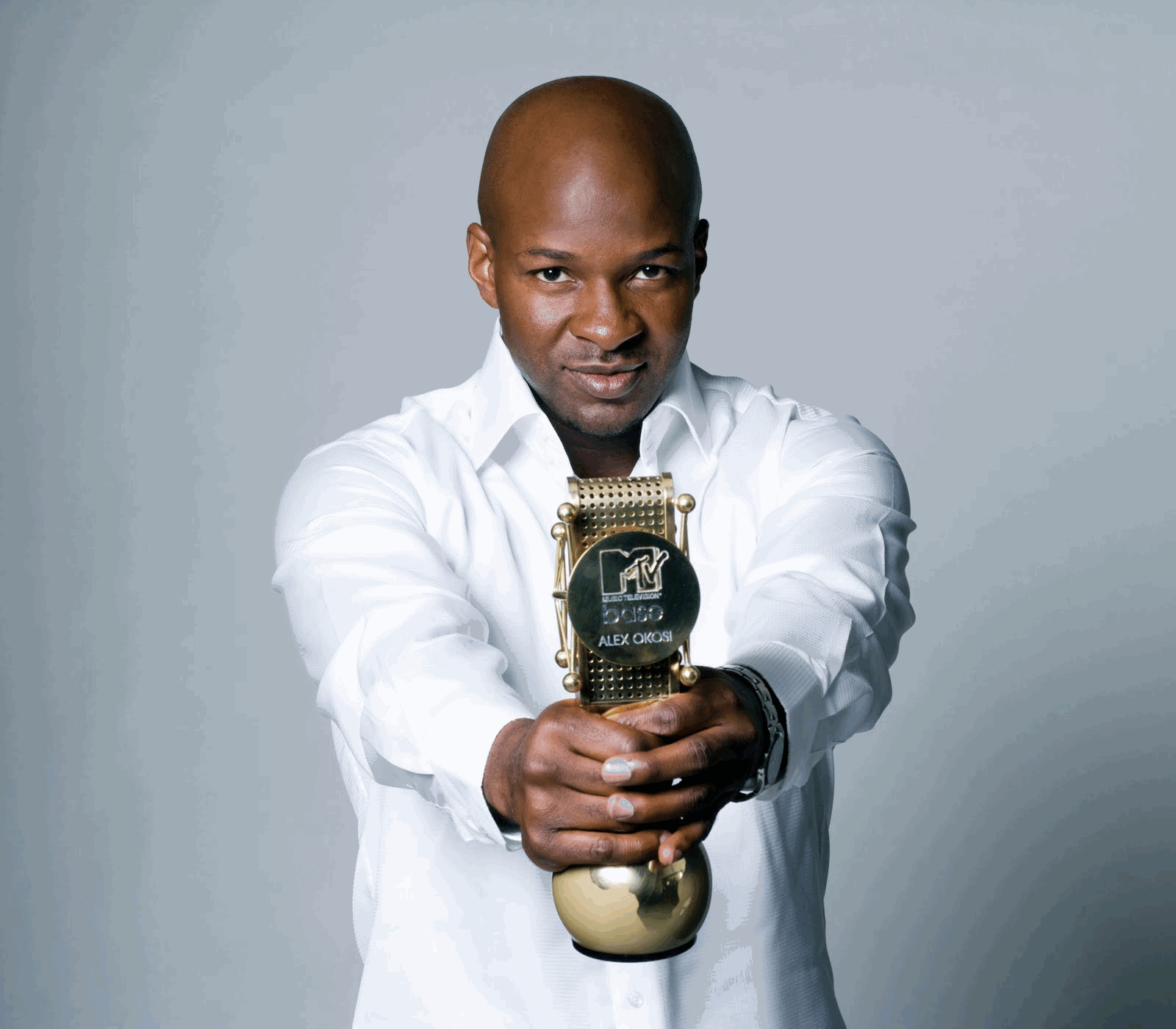
Alex Okosi (Managing Director of MTV holding The MTV Africa Music Award (MaMa)

The MTV Africa Music Awards was conceived and created by the SVP and MD of the MTV Networks in Africa, Alex Okosi alongside the Head of Events of MTV Networks Africa at the time Jandre Louw and Head of Production Dudu Qubu. Earlier, African artists had been included in the MTV Europe Music Award where MTV Base Africa viewers voted for Best African artist in the 2006 and 2007 MTV Europe Music Awards.

The first awards show was held at the Velodrome, Abuja in Nigeria on 22 November 2008 and was broadcast around the world on 29 November in conjunction with Airtel and local television channels in Africa. The show was hosted by Trevor Nelson. The awards were preceded by four concerts celebrating the musicians nominated for the awards. There were concerts featuring international and local nominees, which took place in Johannesburg, South Africa on 5 November, Nairobi, Kenya on 9 November, the Democratic Republic of the Congo on 13 November and Lagos, Nigeria on 15 November 2008. The Award categories included Artist of the Year, Best Alternative, Best Female, Best Group, Best Hip-Hop, Best Live Performance, Best Male, Best New Act, Best R&B, Video of the Year and the MY Video Award which allows viewers to make their own version of a music video.

The 2009 event took place in Nairobi, Kenya at the Moi International Sports Centre in October 2009. In 2010, the awards were again held in Nigeria, at Eko Expo Hall in Lagos. This year, some award categories were to better reflect the music of the entire continent, hence creating awards for Best Anglophone, Best Lusophone and Best Francophone artists.

After a 3-year hiatus (2011, 2012 and 2013), Viacom International Media Networks Africa announced that the MTV Africa Music Awards would return on 7 June 2014. The fifth event took place at the ICC, Durban, KwaZulu-Natal on 18 July 2015, and on 23 August 2016 it was announced that the sixth edition of the MTV Africa Music Awards would take place in Johannesburg, South Africa on 22 October 2016 at the Ticketpro Dome.

In 2017 the popular award didn't hold again. Alex Okosi, Executive Vice President of Viacom International Media Network Africa said the company is working to reinvent the MAMA to create a deeper music experience for the 2018 edition of the award, which didn't happen.

== Host cities ==
Locations of the MTV Africa Music Awards ceremonies.

| Year | Country | Host city | Venue | Host(s) |
|---|---|---|---|---|
| 2008 | Nigeria | Abuja | Velodrome | Trevor Nelson |
| 2009 | Kenya | Nairobi | Moi International Sports Centre | Wyclef Jean |
| 2010 | Nigeria | Lagos | Eko Expo Hall | Eve |
| 2014 | South Africa | Durban | ICC Durban Arena | Marlon Wayans |
| 2015 | South Africa | Durban | ICC Durban Arena | Anthony Anderson |
| 2016 | South Africa | Johannesburg | Ticketpro Dome | Bonang Matheba, Yemi Alade and Nomzamo Mbatha |

== Categories ==
- Artist of the Year
- Best Male
- Best Female
- Best New Act
- Best Group
- Best Live Act
- Best Francophone
- Best Lusophone
- Best Pop/Alternative
- Best Hip Hop
- Best International
- Legend Award
- Best Collaboration in association with Absolut
- Video of the Year
- Song of the Year
- Artist of the Year
- Personality of the Year
- MTV Base Africa Re-Imagined Award

== Winners ==
=== 2008 ===
- Artist of the Year: D’Banj
- Best Video: Ikechukwu — "Wind Am Well"
- Best Female: Wahu
- Best Male: De Boss
- Best Group: P-Square
- Best New Act: Naeto C
- Best Alternative: Seether
- Best Hip-Hop: 9ice
- Best R&B: Alicia Keys
- Best Live Performer: Jozi
- Listener's choice award: D’Banj — "Why Me"
- MAMA legend award: Fela Kuti
- My Video: Jide Rotilu, Adetoro Rotilu, Razor BleeG

=== 2009 ===
- Artist of the Year: D'banj (Nigeria)
- Best Video: HHP — "Mpitse"
- Best Female: Amani (Kenya)
- Best Male: Nameless (Kenya)
- Best Group: P-Square (Nigeria)
- Best New Act: M.I. (Nigeria)
- Best Alternative: Zebra & Giraffe (South Africa)
- Best Hip Hop: M.I. (Nigeria)
- Best R&B: 2face Idibia (Nigeria)
- Best Live Performer: Samini (Ghana)
- Listener's Choice: Nameless — "Sunshine" (Kenya)
- My Video: Patricke-Stevie Moungondo
- Legend Award: Lucky Dube (South Africa)

=== 2010 ===
- Best Anglophone – Daddy Owen (Kenya)
- Best Francophone – Fally Ipupa (DRC)
- Best Lusophone – Cabo Snoop (Angola)
- Artist of the Year – 2Face (Nigeria)
- Best Female – Sasha (Nigeria)
- Best Male – 2Face (Nigeria)
- Best Video – Fally Ipupa (DRC): "Sexy Dance”
- Best Group – P-Square (Nigeria)
- Brand New Act – Mo'Cheddah (Nigeria)
- Best Performance – Big Nuz (South Africa)
- Song of the Year – Liquideep (South Africa): "Fairytale”
- MAMA Legend – Miriam Makeba (South Africa)
- Best International – Eminem (USA)

=== 2014 ===
- Best Francophone – Toofan (Togo)
- Best Lusophone – Anselmo Ralph (Angola)
- Artist of the Year – Davido (Nigeria)
- Best Female – Tiwa Savage (Nigeria)
- Best Male – Davido (Nigeria)
- Best Video – Clarence Peters (Nigeria)
- Best Group – Mafikizolo (South Africa)
- Best New Act – Stanley Enow (Cameroon)
- Best Live Act – Flavour (Nigeria)
- Song of the Year – Mafikizolo ft Uhuru (South Africa): "Khona”
- Best International – Pharrell Williams (USA)
- Best Hip Hop – Sarkodie (Ghana)
- Best Collaboration – Uhuru Ft. Oskido, DJ Bucks, Professor and Yuri da Cunha (South Africa/Angola) : "Y-tjukutja"
- Best Alternative – Gangs of Ballet (South Africa)
- Best Pop – Goldfish (South Africa)
- Personality of the Year – Lupita Nyong'o (Kenya)
- MTV Base Leadership Award – Ashish J. Thakkar (Tanzania)
- Transform Today Award by Absolut – Clarence Peters (Nigeria)

=== 2015 ===
- Best Francophone – DJ Arafat (Ivory Coast)
- Best Lusophone – Ary (Angola)
- Artist of the Decade – P-Square (Nigeria)
- Best Female – Yemi Alade (Nigeria)
- Best Male – Wizkid (Nigeria)
- Best Video – Riky Rick (South Africa) : "Nafukwa"
- Best Group – P-Square (Nigeria)
- Best New Act – Patoranking (Nigeria)
- Best Live Act – Diamond Platnumz (Tanzania)
- Song of the Year – Mavins (Nigeria): "Dorobucci”
- Best International – Nicki Minaj (USA)
- Best Hip Hop – Cassper Nyovest (South Africa)
- Best Collaboration – AKA, Burna Boy, Da LES & JR (South Africa/Nigeria) : "All Eyes On Me"
- Best Pop & Alternative – Jeremy Loops (South Africa)
- Personality of the Year – Trevor Noah (South Africa)
- MTV Base Leadership Award – Saran Kaba Jones & S’Bu Mavundla (Uganda & South Africa)
- MAMA Evolution – D'banj (Nigeria)

=== 2016 ===
- Best Live Act – Cassper Nyovest (South Africa)
- Best Lusophone – C4 Pedro (Angola)
- Legend Award – Hugh Masekela (South Africa)
- Best Female Award – Yemi Alade (Nigeria)
- Best Francophone Award – Serge Beynaud (Ivory Coast)
- Best Group – Sauti Sol (Kenya)
- Best Pop & Alternative – Kyle Deutsch & Shekhinah (South Africa)
- Best International Act – Drake (Canada)
- Best Male Act – Wizkid (Nigeria)
- Listeners Choice – Jah Prayzah (Zimbabwe)
- Video of the Year – Youssoupha Niguer Ma Vie (Congo)
- Best Collaboration – DJ Maphorisa ft Wizkid & DJ Bucks (South Africa & Nigeria)
- Personality of the Year – Caster Semenya (South Africa)
- Best Hip Hop – Emtee (South Africa)
- Best New Act – Tekno (Nigeria)
- Song of the Year – Patoranking ft Wande Coal (Nigeria)
- Artiste of the Year – Wizkid (Nigeria)

=== 2021 ===
The MTV Africa Awards 2021 was postponed. As of November 2024, MTV Africa Awards 2016 remains the last edition of the awards to have taken place.
