= Reunited (Mafikizolo album) =

Studio album by Mafikizolo
- Released: April 10, 2013
- Recorded: 2011–2012
- Genre: House; Afro pop
- Length: 77:55
- Label: Kalawa Jazmee Records; Universal Music South Africa
- Producer: Theo Kgosinkwe; Nonhlanhla Nciza; DJ Maphorisa; Xelimpilo Simelane; Sihle Dlalisa; Nqobile Mahlangu; Oscar Mdlongwa; Mandla "Spikiri" Mofokeng; Pontsho Masote; Mncedisi Ndlangamandla; Nqobile Mahlangu; Khaya Mthiyane; Black Motion; Mickey Mseleku; Bruce Sebitlo

Mafikizolo chronology
Six Mabone (2006)	Reunited (2013)	20 (2017)

Singles from Reunited
- 1. "Khona" Released: January 10, 2013; 2. "Happiness" Released: November 13, 2013

Reunited is the eighth studio album by South African duo Mafikizolo. It was released physically on 10 April 2013 and digitally on 11 April 2013 via iTunes. "Khona", the album's lead single, debuted on January 10, 2013, and was met with critical acclaim.

Reunited bagged three awards Album of the Year, Duo/Group of the Year and Best Pop Album at the 20th South African Music Awards in 2014.

== Track listing ==
No.	Title	Writer(s)	Producer	Length
1.	"Vimba Kanjani"	Theo Kgonsinkwe, Nhlanhla Nciza	Theo Kgosinkwe	5:14
2.	"Khona" (featuring Uhuru & Mapiano)	Kgosinkwe, Sekowe, Simelane, Dlalisa	Mseleku, Sekowe, Simelane, Mahlangu	4:55
3.	"Happiness" (featuring May D)	Kgosinkwe, Nciza, Simelane, Sekowe	Kgosinkwe, Simelane, Sekowe	5:52
4.	"Ndikwazile"	Kgosinkwe	Kgosinkwe, Mthiyane, Mahlangu	6:16
5.	"Saka Harabe Bone"	Kgosinkwe	Mandla Mofokeng, Ndlangamandla	3:55
6.	"Khani Mjongeni"	Nciza, Kgosinkwe	Nciza, Sekowe, Simelane, Dlalisa, Mahlangu	3:56
7.	"Reunited"	Kgosinkwe, Nciza	Kgosinkwe, Mahlangu, Dlalisa, Sekowe, Simelane	5:26
8.	"Amor Da Mia Vida"	Kgosinkwe, Claasen	Black Motion	4:37
9.	"Masiqale Kabusha"	Kgosinkwe	Kgosinkwe, Sekowe, Simelane, Dlalisa, Mahlangu, Mthiyane, Sebitlo	5:06
10.	"Luna Mandla"	Kgosinkwe	Masote	5:07
11.	"Nxese"	Nciza, Kgosinkwe, Simelane	Nciza, Sekowe, Simelane, Dlalisa, Mahlangu	5:17
12.	"Kuze Kuse"	Kgosinkwe, Simelane	Sekowe, Dlalisa, Sebitlo	5:21
13.	"Nakupenda" (featuring Uhuru)	Kgosinkwe, Nciza, Simelane	Mdlongwa, Sekowe, Mahlangu, Dlalisa	4:24
14.	"Ngenxa kaThixo"	Kgosinkwe	Mofokeng, Ndlangamandla	4:26
15.	"Happiness (Oskido & DJ Micks Remix)" (featuring May D)	Kgosinkwe, Nciza, Simelane, Sekowe	Mdlongwa, Mseleku	7:54
Total length:				77:55

== Accolades ==
The Reunited earned the duo numerous awards at 20th South African Music Awards for Album of the Year, Duo or Group of the Year, Best Pop Album, Best Collaboration, Best Selling Ring-back Tone, Record of the Year, Download of the Year

Year	Nominee / work	Award	Result
2014	Reunited	Album of the Year	Won
2014	Reunited	Duo/Group of the Year	Won
2014	Reunited	Best Pop Album	Won
2014	"Happiness"	Best Collaboration	Won
2014	"Khona"	Record of the Year	Won
2014	"Khona"	Best Selling Ring-back Tone	Won
2014	"Khona"	Download of the Year	Won
2014	"Khona"	Best Selling Full-track Download	Won
