= Lola Rae =

Nigerian singer (born 1991)

- Born: Rachel Akosua Funmilola Garton; 20 January 1991 (age 35); Obalende, Lagos, Nigeria
- Genres: Afrobeats; jazz; soul; R&B
- Occupations: Singer; songwriter; dancer
- Years active: 2010–present

Rachel Akosua Funmilola Garton (born 20 January 1991), professionally known as Lola Rae, is a Nigerian-born British-Ghanaian singer, songwriter and dancer. She gained recognition following the release of her debut single, "Watch My Ting Go", which received critical acclaim and thus earned her a nomination for the Most Promising Female Act to Watch at the 2013 Nigeria Entertainment Awards.

== Growing up and education ==
Lola Rae was born to a British father and a Ghanaian mother in Obalende, a suburb of Lagos, Nigeria. She attained her primary and secondary school education at St. Saviour's School, Ikoyi, and Lekki British International High School, Lagos, respectively. She, however left Nigeria for England at the age of 15 to complete her university education at Central Saint Martins, where she studied fashion textiles.

== Career ==
Lola Rae's entertainment career started as a dancer when she was joined the dancing group "Mystikal" in 2010. Mystikal Dancing Group auditioned for Britain's Got Talent, where Rae sang in the competition, and judge Simon Cowell singled Mystikal Dancing group out at the semi-final. At the end of the competition, the group (Mystikal) was signed to Syco for a year. Rae turned down an invitation to The X Factor to pursue a solo career as a singer.

On 19 November 2012, Rae released her debut hit single Watch My Ting Go, and a follow-up single titled High. She was nominated as the "Most Promising Female Act to Watch" at the 2013 Nigeria Entertainment Awards. Her video "Watch My Ting Go" premiered on Soundcity TV on 8 January 2013 with cameo appearances from Iyanya and Emma Nyra. The video was nominated at the 10th Channel O Music Video Awards.

Following the "Watch My Ting Go", Rae featured Iyanya on a song titled Fi Mi Le, which earned her another nomination at the 2014 Nigeria Entertainment Awards. She made a cameo appearance as Ice Prince's love interest in the music video for his song "More".

== Personal life ==
In May 2018, Rae gave birth to a daughter.

== Discography ==
=== Singles ===
As lead artist

List of singles as lead artist, with selected chart positions and certifications, showing year released and album name
| Title | Year | Peak chart positions | | | | | | | Certifications | Album |
| Title | Year | NGA | GHA | RSA | AUS | UK | US | US R&B/HH | Certifications | Album |
|---|---|---|---|---|---|---|---|---|---|---|
| "Watch My Ting Go" | 2012 | – | – | — | — | — | — | — | | Non-album singles |
| "High" (featuring Bridge) | 2012 | – | – | — | — | — | — | — | | Non-album singles |
| "Fi Mi Le" (featuring Iyanya) | 2013 | – | – | — | — | — | — | — | | Non-album singles |
| "She Knows He Knows" | 2013 | – | – | — | — | — | — | — | | Non-album singles |
| "You Know What My Name Is" | 2015 | – | – | — | — | — | — | — | | Non-album singles |
| "One Time" | 2016 | – | – | — | — | — | — | — | | |
"—" denotes a recording that did not chart or was not released in that territory.

As featured artist

List of singles as featured artist, with selected chart positions and certifications, showing year released and album name
| Title | Year | Peak chart positions | | | | | | | Certifications | Album |
| Title | Year | NGA | GHA | RSA | AUS | UK | US | US R&B/HH | Certifications | Album |
|---|---|---|---|---|---|---|---|---|---|---|
| "Ginger" (BOJ featuring Lola Rae) | 2013 | – | – | — | — | — | — | — | | Non-album singles |
| "Coupe Bibamba (Remix)" (Awilo Longomba featuring Lola Rae) | 2013 | – | – | — | — | — | — | — | | Non-album singles |
| "Egwu" (Nizzy featuring Lola Rae) | 2014 | – | – | — | — | — | — | — | | Non-album singles |
| "Work" (TeeJay featuring Lola Rae) | 2014 | – | – | — | — | — | — | — | | Non-album singles |
| "Pele Mo" (Danagog featuring Lola Rae) | 2015 | – | – | — | — | — | — | — | | Non-album singles |
"—" denotes a recording that did not chart or was not released in that territory.

Promotional singles

List of promotional singles as featured artist, with selected chart positions and certifications, showing year released and album name
| Title | Year | Peak chart positions | | | | | | | Certifications | Album |
| Title | Year | NGA | GHA | RSA | AUS | UK | US | US R&B/HH | Certifications | Album |
|---|---|---|---|---|---|---|---|---|---|---|
| "Africa Rising" (Davido, Tiwa Savage, Lola Rae, Sarkodie, Diamond Platnumz and Mi Casa) | 2014 | – | – | — | — | — | — | — | | Non-album singles |
"—" denotes a recording that did not chart or was not released in that territory.

== Awards and nominations ==
| Year | Award ceremony | Prize | Work/Recipient | Result | Ref |
|---|---|---|---|---|---|
| 2013 | 2013 Channel O Africa Music Video Awards | Most Gifted Newcomer | "Watch My Ting Go" | Nominated | |
| 2013 | 2013 Nigeria Entertainment Awards | Most Promising Female Act to Watch | Herself | Nominated | |
| 2014 | 2014 Nigeria Entertainment Awards | Diaspora Artist of The Year | Herself | Nominated | |
