= Dami Duro =

Single by Davido

from the album Omo Baba Olowo
- Released: October 30, 2011
- Recorded: August 2011
- Genre: Afropop
- Length: 4:12
- Label: HKN Music
- Songwriter: David Adeleke
- Producers: Shizzi; Davido

Davido singles chronology
| "Back When" (2011) | "Dami Duro" (2011) | "Ekuro" (2012) |

Music video
- "Dami Duro" on YouTube

"Dami Duro" (Yoruba: Stop Me) is a song by Nigerian singer Davido. It was released as the second single from his debut studio album, Omo Baba Olowo (2012). The song peaked at number 1 on Gold Myne's list of the top 10 songs of 2012, surpassing Iyanya's "Kukere". "Dami Duro" won Hottest Single of the Year at the 2012 Nigeria Entertainment Awards. In August 2025, the song was ranked #14 on Billboard's list of the 50 Best Afrobeats Songs of All Time.

== Background and promotion ==
"Dami Duro" was recorded in August 2011. The song was unfinished, and leaked on 30 October 2011. The repeated "na na na na na" vocal was originally not meant to be in the song, but once it leaked, Davido chose not to rerecord the song after the leak and left it unchanged. The beat for "Dami Duro" was originally intended for Sexy Steel. Davido changed his mind and decided to keep it for himself, contacting Shizzi to help him alter it. He met Shizzi at Wande Coal's house during beatmaking sessions for Wizkid's debut album, Superstar (2011). The music video for "Dami Duro" was released on January 8, 2012, during the Occupy Nigeria protests. It was filmed in Lagos and directed by Clarence Peters.

The song's popularity extended to the political world. Former Oyo State governor Abiola Ajimobi sang the song while giving a speech at the University of Ibadan. In December 2013, Davido performed "Dami Duro" at a concert sponsored by a brewing company; the event was held at the Kyadondo Rugby Club in Kampala and featured additional performances from several acts, including Jose Chameleon. During his performance, Davido paid tribute to Nelson Mandela.

== Remix ==
The remix of "Dami Duro" features vocals by Senegalese-American singer Akon. In a brief interview with Blue Revolution Entertainment in Miami, Davido said the song was recorded in May 2012. A writer for Africa Public commended both artists for their work on the remix, saying, "I like the new verse, it gave a new vibe to the track. Apart from the fact that auto tune makes their voice sound more similar; Akon actually did well when it came to the Yoruba aspect."

== Accolades ==
| Year | Awards ceremony | Award description(s) | Results | Ref |
|---|---|---|---|---|
| 2012 | Channel O Music Video Awards | Most Gifted Dance Video of the Year | Nominated | |
| 2012 | Channel O Music Video Awards | Most Gifted Newcomer Video of the Year | Won | |
| 2012 | Nigeria Music Video Awards (NMVA) | Best Video By A New Artiste (Live Beats Choice) | Won | |
| 2012 | 4Syte TV Music Video Awards | Best African Act Video | Nominated | |
| 2012 | Nigeria Entertainment Awards | Hottest Single of the Year | Won | |
| 2012 | The Headies | Best Pop Single | Nominated | |
| 2012 | The Headies | Song of the Year | Nominated | |

== Covers and remixes ==
- Digital download
1. "Dami Duro" (Sai Phifer featuring Victoria Kimani and Archapello) - 4:16
2. "Dami Duro" (Mayorkun cover) - 4:10
3. "Dance Azonto" (Mr Eazi cover) - 3:54
