= Yuri da Cunha =

- Born: Álvaro Yuri Alberto da Cunha; 13 September 1980 (age 45); Sumbe, Angola
- Genres: Kizomba; semba
- Occupation: Singer
- Years active: 1993–present

Álvaro Yuri Alberto da Cunha (born 13 September 1980) is an Angolan singer. He is famous for songs such as “Atchu tchu tcha”, "Tu és o amor", and "Kuma kwa kie". His stage presence has earned him the nickname of "The Show Man".

== Biography ==
Cunha was born in Sumbe in the province of Cuanza Sul on 13 September 1980. He and his family moved to Luanda in 1983, when he was three years old, due to the Angolan Civil War. With his musical talents, he began performing at 10 years old and began schooling at the school of Rádio Nacional de Angola. He released his first CD in 1993.

His influences include André Mingas, Carlos Burity, Eduardo Paím, and Michael Jackson, among others. He is known for his dances, energy, and rhythm inspired by Angolan musical traditions. His dancing is inspired partly by musicians from the Democratic Republic of Congo that were introduced by a Congolese ex-girlfriend, such as Koffi Olomide, Papa Wemba, and Wenge Musica. In addition to Portuguese, he has songs with titles in Kimbundu and has expressed interest in singing in Kikongo.

In 2004, with Makumba, he won that year's Top Rádio Luanda. Cunha was also the winner of Rádio Luanda 2008, in the Kianda do Sucesso category for his amount of shows and recognition of his country's culture. He was featured in the song “Mona Ki Ngi Xica” in Playing for Change's 2009 album Playing For Change: Songs Around The World.

In 2010, Cunha participated in a tour with Eros Ramazzotti through Europe. He has also collaborated with C4 Pedro, Eduardo Paím, Paulo Flores, and DJ Tarico. He collaborated with Xuxa in her 2011 album XSPB 11, featuring in the song "Sabonete, Sabão" with his son Higino.

His 2013 collaboration with South African musical group Uhuru, "Y-tjukutja", became one the most-played songs in South Africa at the time. They performed the song at the MTV Africa Music Awards 2014 and won the award for Best Collaboration with the song. Cunha himself was nominated twice, with Song of the Year for "Atchu tchu tcha" and as Best Lusophone act. He would perform at MEO Sudoeste later that year.

In 2020, Cunha was nominated by the 2020 African Entertainment Awards USA for Best Palop Male Artist.

== Discography ==
- 1999 - É tudo amor
- 2005 - Eu
- 2009 - Kuma Kwa Kié
- 2014 - Canta Artur Nunes
- 2017 - O intérprete
- 2022 - No Tempo das Bessanganas
