= Alex Okosi =

Nigerian managing director

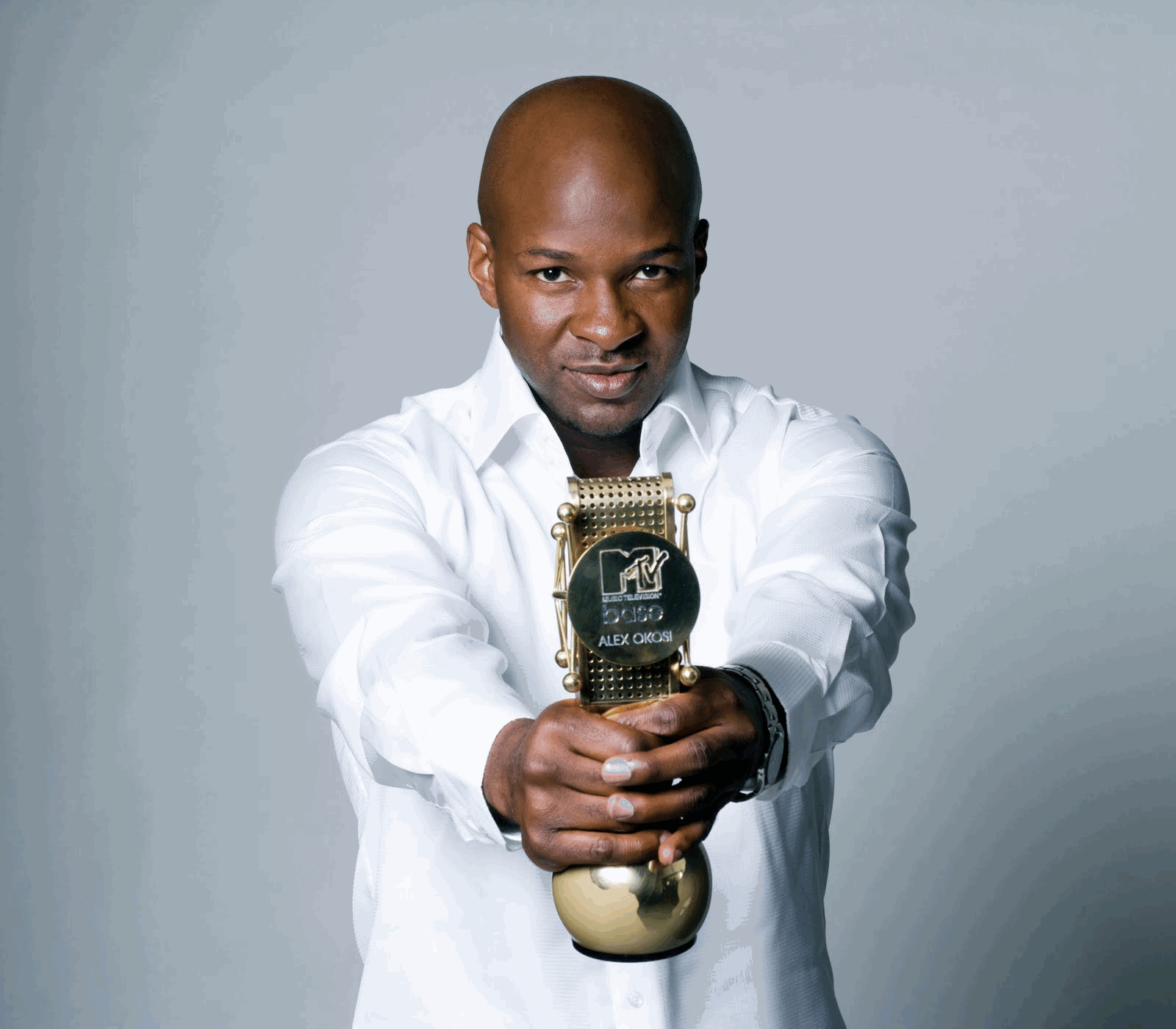
- Okosi holding The MTV Africa Music Award (MaMa)
- Born: Ogbuefi Akunne Alex Uche Okosi; Nigeria
- Education: Phillips Exeter Academy; Saint Michael's College
- Employer: Google
- Title: Managing director of Google Africa

Ogbuefi Akunne Alex Uche Okosi,(//) known as simply Alex Okosi, is a Nigerian business executive who is currently the managing director of the African operations of Google, including programs that help African businesses and economies on the continent to grow. He previously worked for YouTube and MTV Africa.

== Early life ==
Okosi was educated in Enugu, Nigeria until the age of 12, before finishing his education in the United States. While visiting his brothers in the U.S, Okosi made the decision to stay there to complete his education, and he subsequently studied at schools in New York, Missouri, Nebraska and Florida before attending Phillips Exeter Academy in Exeter, New Hampshire.

Okosi continued his studies at Saint Michael's College, Vermont, where he enrolled in a double major in business administration and economics. He graduated Magna cum laude in 1998. Okosi was awarded a full scholarship to play Division II basketball for Saint Michael's. In 1998, he represented his college at Basketball, captaining the Purple Knights’ second team to victory.

== Viacom/Paramount ==
Okosi spent 22 years at MTV and Viacom (the predecessor to Paramount Skydance) in a range of leadership roles.

Okosi joined MTV Networks in New York in 1998 as part of the Trade and Integrated Marketing team. He developed multi-platform marketing opportunities for advertisers and integrated them into marquee MTV franchises such as the MTV Video Music Awards, Spring Break, the MTV Movie Awards, and Wanna Be a VJ. In 2000, Okosi transferred to the MTV Networks Affiliate Sales & Marketing division in Los Angeles, where he was responsible for securing distribution for MTV Networks brands such as MTV, Nickelodeon, VH1, CMT, MTV2, and Paramount Network (at the time known as Spike TV).

In 2003, Okosi moved to MTV International in London as a Manager in the MTV International Strategy & Business Development team

In 2007, Okosi was named SVP & MD of MTV Networks Africa. In 2013, this title changed to SVP & MD, Viacom International Media Networks (VIMN) Africa. In 2009, he launched the MTV Africa Music Awards, and helmed five editions of the music franchise.

In 2017, Okosi was promoted to MD & EVP, Viacom International Media Networks Africa and EVP of BET International.

Under Alex's leadership, Viacom Africa channels were recognised for their creativity and excellence, including more than 70 Promax/BDA Awards, 11 SAFTAs (South Africa Film & Television Awards) and a Cannes Lions Award (2018).

=== MTV Base (Africa) ===
Having joined MTV International, Okosi authored the business plan to launch MTV's first African TV channel. Known initially as MTV base (with a lowercase 'b'), the channel was launched in February 2005, becoming MTV's first African TV channel and MTV's 100th channel worldwide. The channel was designed to provide a high quality platform that promoted African contemporary music and creativity, while catering to the tastes and attitudes of African youth. The channel featured African contemporary urban musicians and music videos, alongside some longform music and entertainment shows. The launch of the new service was marked with two live music celebrations - MTV Base 100th Live! - held days apart in April 2005 in Abuja, Nigeria and Johannesburg, South Africa.

That year, Okosi was named vice president and general manager of MTV Base.

== YouTube ==
In April 2020, Okosi joined YouTube as the managing director of YouTube EMEA Emerging Markets.He oversaw the expansion of YouTube’s operations across Africa, the Middle East, and Turkey. He also worked to promote content creators and emerging voices from across Africa.

Okosi played a key role in landing YouTube's $100M Black Voice Fund in EMEA and partnered with Idris Elba to launch the annual Africa Day Benefit Concert.

He was also an executive member of the Google and YouTube committees tasked with driving and delivering the companies' racial equity commitments across the EMEA region.

== Google ==
In September 2023, Google appointed Okosi as managing director of Google Africa.

== Awards and achievements ==
- 2024 Iconic Pioneer Award, Silverbird Man of the Year Awards.
- 2023 UK "Powerlist"
- 2022 UK "Powerlist", which recognises the UK's 100 most influential people of African heritage.
- 2019 Honorary Fellow of the Nigerian Institute of Marketing of Nigeria
- 2018 All Africa Business Leader Award Finalist
- 2014 Ai Investment & Business Leader Awards: “Up & Coming Future Leader of the Year”
- 2013 - New African Magazine: “Africa's 50 Trailblazers Under 50”
- 2013 - New African Magazine: “Top 100 most Influential Africans”
- 2013 Young Global Leader, World Economic Foundation (WEF)
- 2011 New Champion for an Enduring Culture, ThisDay Awards, receiving his award from Arnold Schwarzenegger.
