= Lyrikal =

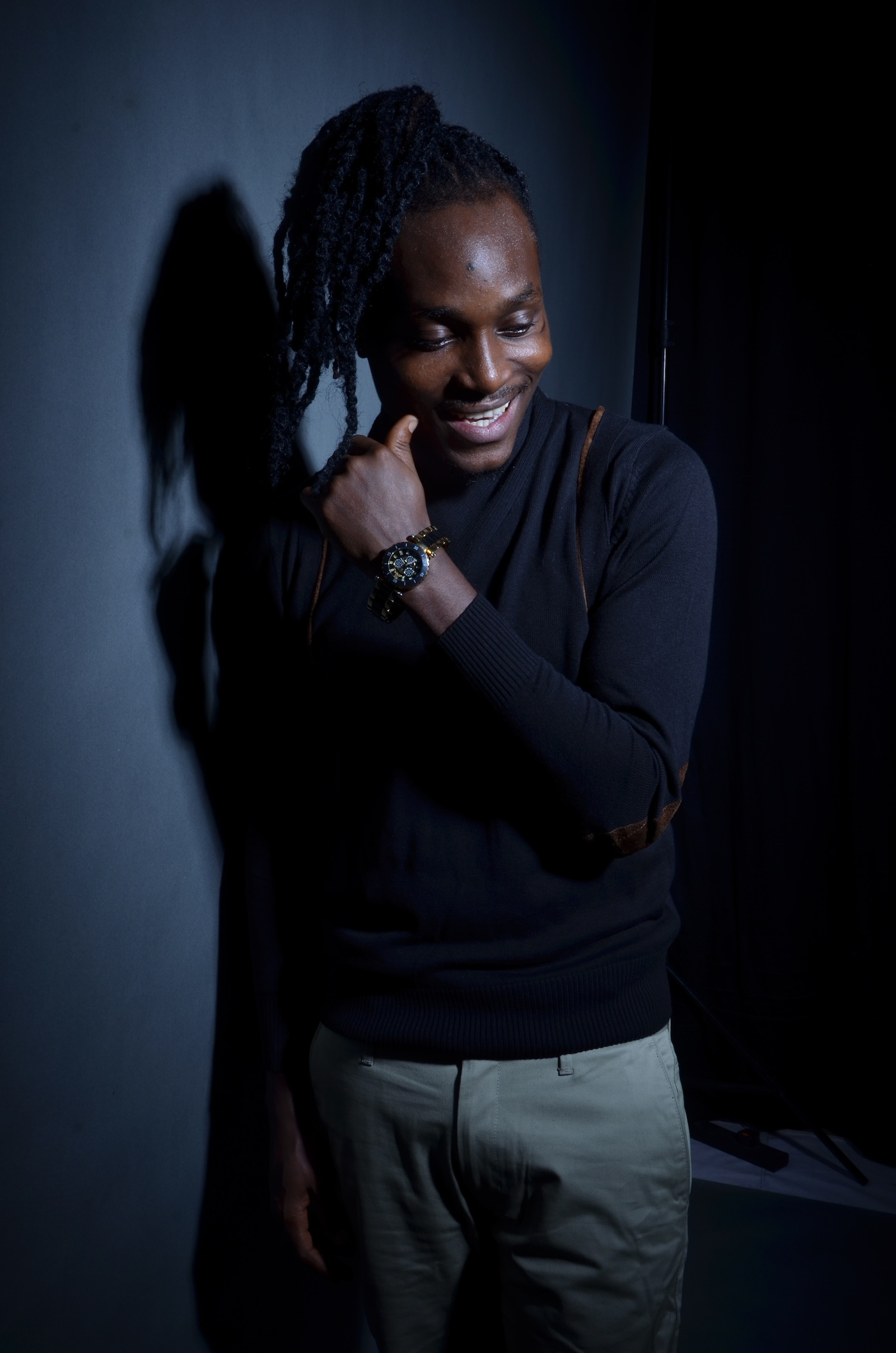

Background information
- Also known as: Lyrikal
- Born: Jesse James Enoch
- Origin: Port Harcourt, Nigeria
- Genre: Hip Hop
- Occupation: Singer-songwriterRapper Producer
- Years active: 2001–present
- Website: www.lyrikalofficial.tumbr.com

Jesse James Enoch (born 14 September 1983), better known by his stage name Lyrikal, is a Nigerian rapper, record producer, and songwriter. He started his professional music career in 2003 with Port Harcourt city based record label Tuck Tyght, where he released his first official single 'Learn Something'. His second single 'Can U Relate' addressed Socio-political issues in Nigeria. Lyrikal has since become a voice for the gifted and the oppressed.

== Early life ==
He was born in Aba, Abia and hails from Akwa Ibom state. He spent his formative years in Sokoto. As the second child of a retired civil servant, Jesse relocated with his family in 1989 to Port Harcourt where his father was posted to serve. He received his primary and secondary school education in Port Harcourt and in 2005 he gained admission into The University of Lagos. He dropped out a year later due to insufficient funds and returned to Port Harcourt.

=== Music career ===
Lyrikal claims his inspiration for making music comes from being exposed to almost all genres of music during his early years, especially reggae and disco. His early music influences were Madonna, Michael Jackson, Mc Hammer, and Shabba Ranks. His love for rap music manifested when he saw the 1990 film House Party.

=== Early 90s – 2006 ===
In the early 1990s, young Lyrikal fell in love with Hip Hop and honed his skills in rapping, rhyming and song writing. He would later be influenced by the music and works of acts like Snoop Dogg, Dr. Dre, Tupac Shakur, Wu Tang Clan, and Nas (whom he also happens to share the same birthday with, though ten years apart). In 2003, he began his career with Tuck Tyght, where he contributed to the Port Harcourt City album "Now Official".

=== 2006 – 2010 ===
In 2006, Jesse went on a solo campaign with "The Escalator Project", during which he recorded over thirty songs including a number of singles.

=== 2010 – 2013 ===
In late 2010, Lyrikal moved to Xcel Music where he recorded over a hundred songs. His debut project was released in 2013 titled "R.M.F.A.O (Rappin' My Fuckin' Ass Off)".

=== 2014 ===
Lyrikal promoted the release of his second mixtape titled "OCD: Obsessive Compulsive Disorder, which features contributions from Mode 9, Eva Alordiah, KING STUNNA, Korkomikor and more. On 6 January 2014 he released 'Focused'; the first official single off the OCD mixtape. Subsequently, he released his covers to Pound Cake by Drake, Tom Ford by Jay-Z and Rap God by Eminem.

== Behind Bars Campaign ==
In January 2014, Lyrikal embarked on a campaign to inspire young Nigerians towards a more proactive engagement with both their personal development and national development. On 16 January 2014 he released a photo series of himself online behind prison bars. Each photograph was captioned with thought provoking quotes from Lyrikal himself, Nelson Mandela, William Glasser, Henri Matisse and a few others. The photos were featured on different blogs across the African continent and stimulated conversations relating to social participation in national development and the general creativity behind the photo campaign. Inside the press release, Lyrikal explained; "Hip Hop is a form of self-expression that tries to challenge or merely evoke the mood of the circumstances of an environment. The bars are a metaphorical play on the musical jargon; where they represent a point in a verse which contains the punchline for a rap – this is why we used sixteen photos. But most importantly, the bars represent the physical oppression, mental captivity and creative limitations facing the Nigerian youth today "

== Discography ==
- 2013: RMFAO (mixtape)
- 2014: O.C.D (mixtape)

== See also ==
- List of Nigerian rappers
