= Uhuru (band) =

South African music band

- Also known as: Manyora a Muzik; Originators
- Genres: Kwaito; house; electronic
- Years active: 2012–2016
- Labels: Kalawa Jazmee Records
- Past members: DJ Maphorisa; DJ Clap; Mapiano; Xelimpilo
- Website: uhurumusic.co.za

Uhuru (Swahili: freedom) were a South African musical band best known for producing the hit single "Khona" performed by Mafikizolo. Signed to Kalawa Jazmee, the band consisted of Nqobile Mahlanu (Mapiano), Sihle Dlalisisa (DJ Clap), Xelimpilo Simelane (Xeli) and Themba Sekowe (DJ Maphorisa). Independently, Uhuru is best known for hit remixes like "Y-tjukutja" and "The Sound".

== Background ==
Prior to collaborating in 2012, Mapiano and Xeli were friends who were into playing contemporary African jazz in Soshanguve where they originated from. The band members were signed through DJ Clap who was already an artiste signed to Kalawa Jazmee Records. Uhuru manages artwork and production in house as DJ Clap, Mapiano and Xeli mainly act as DJ, pianist and vocalist respectively.

== Career ==
Uhuru shot into limelight in 2013 after the release of the chart-topping single titled "Y-tjukutja", in part featuring Oskido and Angolan singer Yuri da Cunha, went on to be dubbed as the song of the year for 2013 in South Africa. The producers also featured in "Khona", a song which topped many music charts and won several awards in South Africa and beyond including the 2014 MTV Africa Music Awards. In 2015, the collaborating artists undertook solo ambitions. By 2016, the Uhuru brand underwent serious challenges and incorporated a new face. Later in 2016, Uhuru released "Own Devices", "The Sound (Remix)" and Free Prophecy, Vol 1. under new management, putting to rest rumoured band break-ups.

== Band members ==
=== Current roster ===
- (Uhuru is no longer active).

=== Former acts ===
- DJ Maphorisa
- DJ Clap
- Mapiano
- Xelimpilo

== Discography ==
=== Selected singles ===
- "Pata Pata" (2012)
- "Work" (2012)
- "Pepe" (2012)
- "Not Yet Uhuru" (2012)
- "Umraro" (2012)
- "Follow" (2012)
- "Ketsetse" (2013)
- "Thathi Sgubhu" (2013)
- "Ungowami" (2013)
- "Sweety Mabhebeza" (2013)
- "Y-tjukutja" (2013)
- "Raindrops" (2014)
- "Nne" (2014)
- "Kumi Na Mbili" (2014)
- "Kumi Na Tatu" (2014)
- "Nane" (2014)
- "Kumi" (2014)
- "Unity ina Diversity" (2015)
- "Duze" (2015)
- "Shoota Babylone (2015)
- "Circles" (2015)

=== As featured artists ===
- "Khona" – Mafikizolo ft. Uhuru (2013)
- "Speaker" – Professor ft. Oskido and Uhuru
- "Move" – Becca ft. Uhuru (2014)
- "Nakupenda" – Mafikizolo ft. Uhuru (2014)
- "Komolop Cholop" – MC Galaxy ft. Uhuru (2015)
- "The Sound" – Davido ft. Uhuru (2015)
- "The Banger" – Runtown ft. Uhuru (2015)
- "The Sound (Remix)" – Davido ft. G-Eazy and Uhuru (2016)

=== Albums ===
- Symbiose (2006)
- Not Yet (2012)
- Our Father (2013)
- Safari (2014)
- Free Prophecy, Vol 1. (2016)

== Awards and nominations ==
- "Quem Ti Mandou" by Lizha James featuring Uhuru nominated for Most Gifted Female Video at the 2014 Channel O Music Video Awards
- "Y-Tjukutja" nominated for Most Gifted Duo/Group or Featuring Video at the 2014 Channel O Music Video Awards
- "Ngoku" by Busiswa featuring Oskido and Uhuru won Most Gifted Dance Video at the 2014 Channel O Music Video Awards
- "Y-Tjukutja" nominated for Most Gifted Dance Video at the 2014 Channel O Music Video Awards
- "Y-Tjukutja" won Most Gifted Kwaito Video at the 2014 Channel O Music Video Awards
- Nominated for African Artist of the Year (Non-Nigerian) at the 2014 Nigeria Entertainment Awards
- Nominated for Best New Act at the MTV Africa Music Awards 2014
- "Y-Tjukutja" won Best Collaboration at the MTV Africa Music Awards 2014
- Nominated for Artist of the Year at the MTV Africa Music Awards 2014
- "Khona" by Mafikizolo featuring Uhuru won Song of the Year at the MTV Africa Music Awards 2014
- Nominated for Best African Group/Duo/Band for "Y-Tjukutja" at the 2014 All Africa Music Awards
- "Y-Tjukutja" nominated for Best African Collaboration at the 2014 All Africa Music Awards
- "Y-Tjukutja" nominated for Song of the Year at the 2014 All Africa Music Awards
- Nominated for Artiste of the Year at the 2014 All Africa Music Awards
- Nominated for African Artiste of the Year at The Headies 2015
- Nominated for 'Best Electronic Act' at the 2016 Unsigned Music Awards

== See also ==
- List of South African musicians
