= Mafikizolo =

South African music group

- Origin: South Africa
- Genres: Kwaito; Afro house; house; Afro-soul; Afro pop
- Years active: 1997–present
- Labels: Universal, Kalawa Jazmee
- Members: Theo Kgosinkwe; Nhlanhla Mafu
- Past members: Tebogo Benedict Madingoane
- Website: Official website

Mafikizolo is a South African Afro-pop music group formed in 1996, consisting of songwriter Theo Kgosinkwe, lead singer Nhlanhla Mafu and formerly Tebogo Madingoane, who was shot and killed 14 February 2004. The group rose to fame after they released their singles "Ndihamba Nawe", "Kwela Kwela", "Sibongile", "Udakwa Njalo" . The group released their self-titled album Mafikizolo in 1997 and Music Revolution in 1999.

In 2000, the band released their third album Gate Crashers, which became their best-selling album.

Mafikizolo has won 14 South African Music Awards, and two MTV Africa Music Awards including the award for Best Duo or Group of the Year.

== History ==
=== 1997-2002: Mafikizolo, Music Revolution and Sibongile ===
They came into the scene in 1997 as a kwaito group with their late member Tebogo Madingoane, who died on 14 February 2004, when they released their self-titled album Mafikizolo. They released their 1999 album titled Music Revolution followed by Gate Crushers in 2000 which included their hits, "Lotto" and "Majika".

After a near-fatal crash that left Nhlanhla Mafu hospitalised for a while, they released their critically acclaimed album Sibongile (2002) featuring the hit single "Ndihamba Nawe".

=== 2003-2010: Kwela, Van Toeka Af and Six Mabone ===
In 2003, they released Kwela which featured Hugh Masekela assisted "Kwela Kwela", "Udakwa Njalo" and "Emlanjeni" amongst others.

In 2005, they released Van Toeka Af which featured Nisixoshelani and Mas'Thokoze amongst others. In 2006, they released Six Mabone which featured "O Tswa Kae" and "Love Potion". Six Mabone was released before their hiatus.

During their hiatus in 2009 they released a compilation album The Best of which included one new song, "Walila".

=== 2011-2018: Reunited and 20 ===
They resumed work as a group in 2013 when they released their internationally acclaimed single "Khona" featuring Uhuru. In 2014, "Khona" single was performed live at MTV Africa Music Awards during the ceremony.

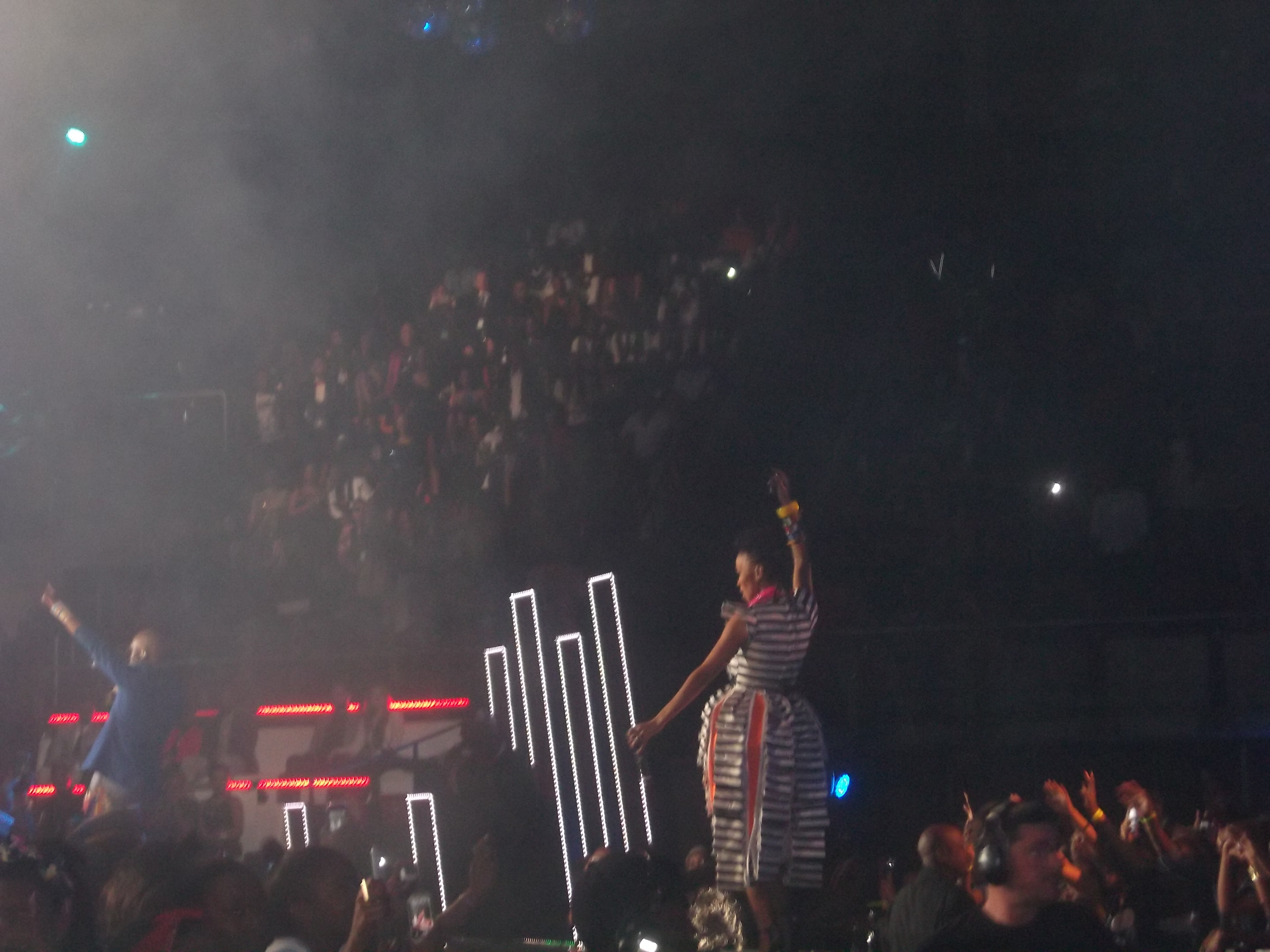
Performing at MTV Africa Music Awards 2014

Their first album after their hiatus followed in 2013 and was titled Reunited which saw them winning awards at 20th South Africa Music Awards in one night amongst other awards. To promote Reunited they embarked on UK Tour, performed in three cities London, Manchester and Coventry. Mafikizolo was nominated for Best African Act at MTV Europe Music Awards in 2013. The success of Reunited was so great that they released a follow-up album four years later in 2017 titled 20 to celebrate their 20th anniversary in the music industry. The album features "Love Potion" and the Yemi Alade-assisted "Ofana Nawe".

At 24th South African Music Awards, 20 received three nominations and won Duo/Group of the Year and Best Engineered album category.

=== 2019-present: Idwala ===
After three years they announced their upcoming album which was set to be released in 2022.

In November 2021, their single "Mamezala" featuring South African singer Simmy was released. The song peaked number 9 on Radio Monitor Charts.

"10k" featuring South African singer Sjava was released on June 10, 2022.

Their twelfth studio album Idwala was released on August 26, 2022.

== Band members ==
- Nhlanhla Mafu - lead vocals (1996–Present)
- Theo Kgosinkwe - (1996–present)
- Tebogo Benedict Madingoane - (1996-2004)

== Discography ==
=== Studio albums ===
- Mafikizolo (1997)
- Music Revolution (1999)
- Gate Crashers (2000)
- Sibongile (2002)
- Kwela (2003)
- Van Toeka Af (2005)
- Six Mabone (2006)
- Reunited (2013)
- 20 (2017)
- Idwala (2022)

== Awards and nominations ==
Year	Award	Category	Results	Ref.
2003	9th SAMA	Group of the Year	Won	
2004	10th SAMA	Duo of the year	Won	
2005	11th SAMA	Best Duo/Group	Nominated	
2005	11th SAMA	Best African Pop Album	Nominated	
2005	11th SAMA	Artist of the Year	Nominated	
2005	11th SAMA	Song of the Year	Nominated	
2007	13th SAMA	Best Duo/Group	Won	
2007	13th SAMA	Best DVD Compilation	Won	
2014	MTV Africa Music Awards	Artist of the Year	Nominated	
2014	MTV Africa Music Awards	Best Group	Won	
2014	MTV Africa Music Awards	Best Collaboration	Nominated	
2014	MTV Africa Music Awards	Song of the Year	Won	
2014	20th SAMA	Album of the year	Won	
2014	20th SAMA	Best Pop Album	Won	
2014	20th SAMA	Record of the Year	Won	
2014	20th SAMA	Duo/Group of the Year	Won	
2014	20th SAMA	Best Selling Full Track Download	Won	
2014	20th SAMA	Best Ring Back Tone	Won	
2014	20th SAMA	Best Selling Mobile Music Download	Won	
2016	MTV Africa Music Awards	Best Live Act	Nominated	
2018	24th SAMA	Duo or Group of the Year	Won	
2018	24th SAMA	Best Afro-pop album	Won	
2018	24th SAMA	Best Engineered Album	Won	
2018	24th SAMA	Record of the year	Nominated	
2019	African Entertainment Awards Awards	Hottest Group	Nominated	
2024	African Entertainment Awards Awards	Best Duo/Group	Won	
