= Walshy Fire =

Jamaican-American DJ (born 1976)

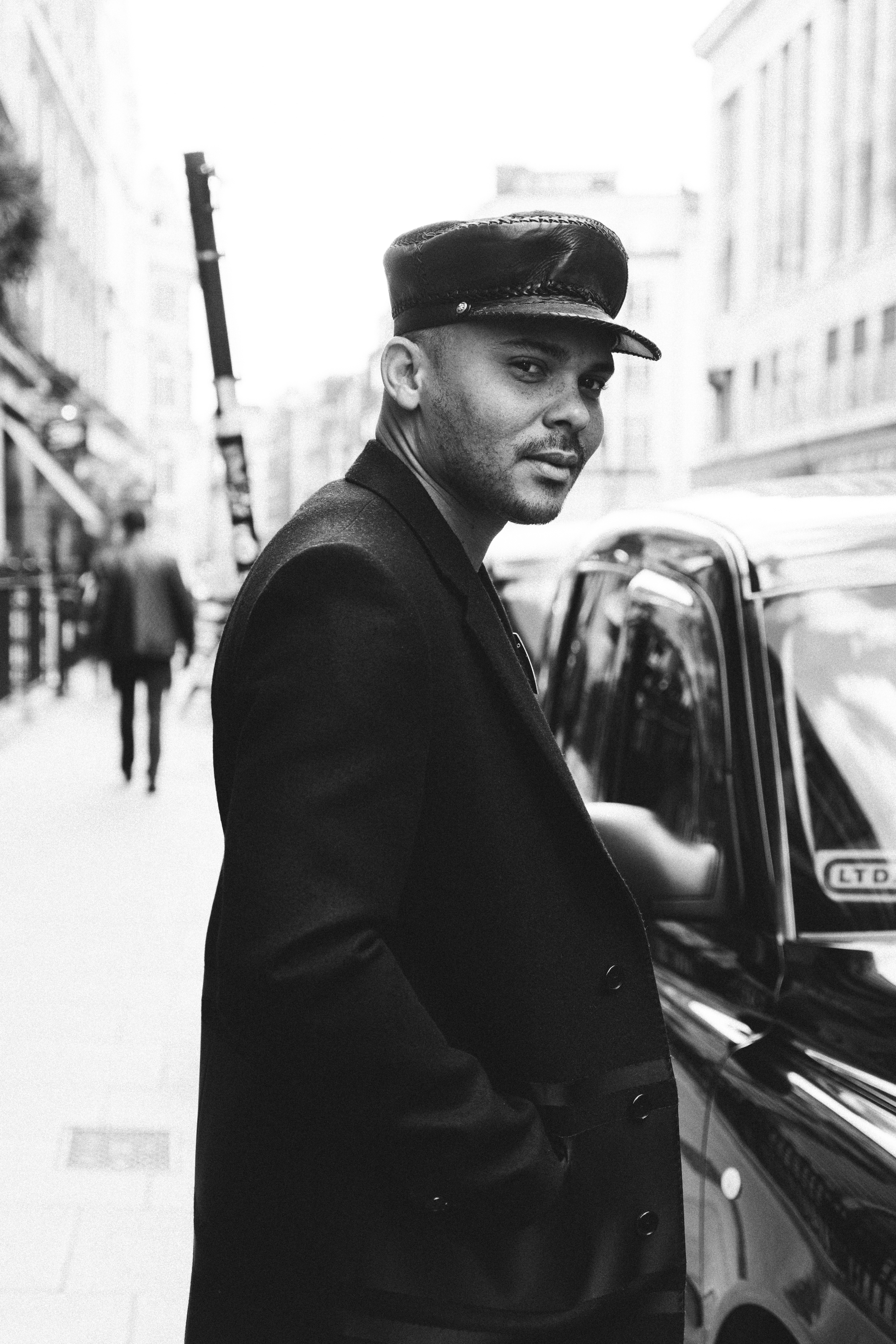
- Walshy Fire in 2016

Background information
- Born: Leighton Paul Walsh; May 3, 1976 (age 50); Dade County, Florida, U.S.
- Occupations: DJ; MC; record producer
- Label: Mad Decent
- Member of: Black Chiney; Major Lazer

Leighton Paul Walsh, better known by his stage name Walshy Fire, is an American DJ, MC and record producer. He is part of the dancehall reggae-influenced group Major Lazer alongside fellow DJs Diplo and Ape Drums. Walshy Fire toured with the Black Chiney sound system beginning in 2004. Black Chiney is cited as a significant influence on the evolution of Major Lazer with its mashups that blend hip hop or R&B rhythms with reggae & R&B artist vocal tracks and its representation of the Jamaican sound system. The subsequent mix tapes that the Black Chiney collective of DJs, engineers and MCs would develop were the training ground for Walshy to become a remix producer.

== Early life ==
Walsh was born on May 3, 1976 in Dade County, Florida, and grew up in Carol City in a Jamaican family of partial Chinese descent. He attended North Miami Beach High School.

== Musical influences ==
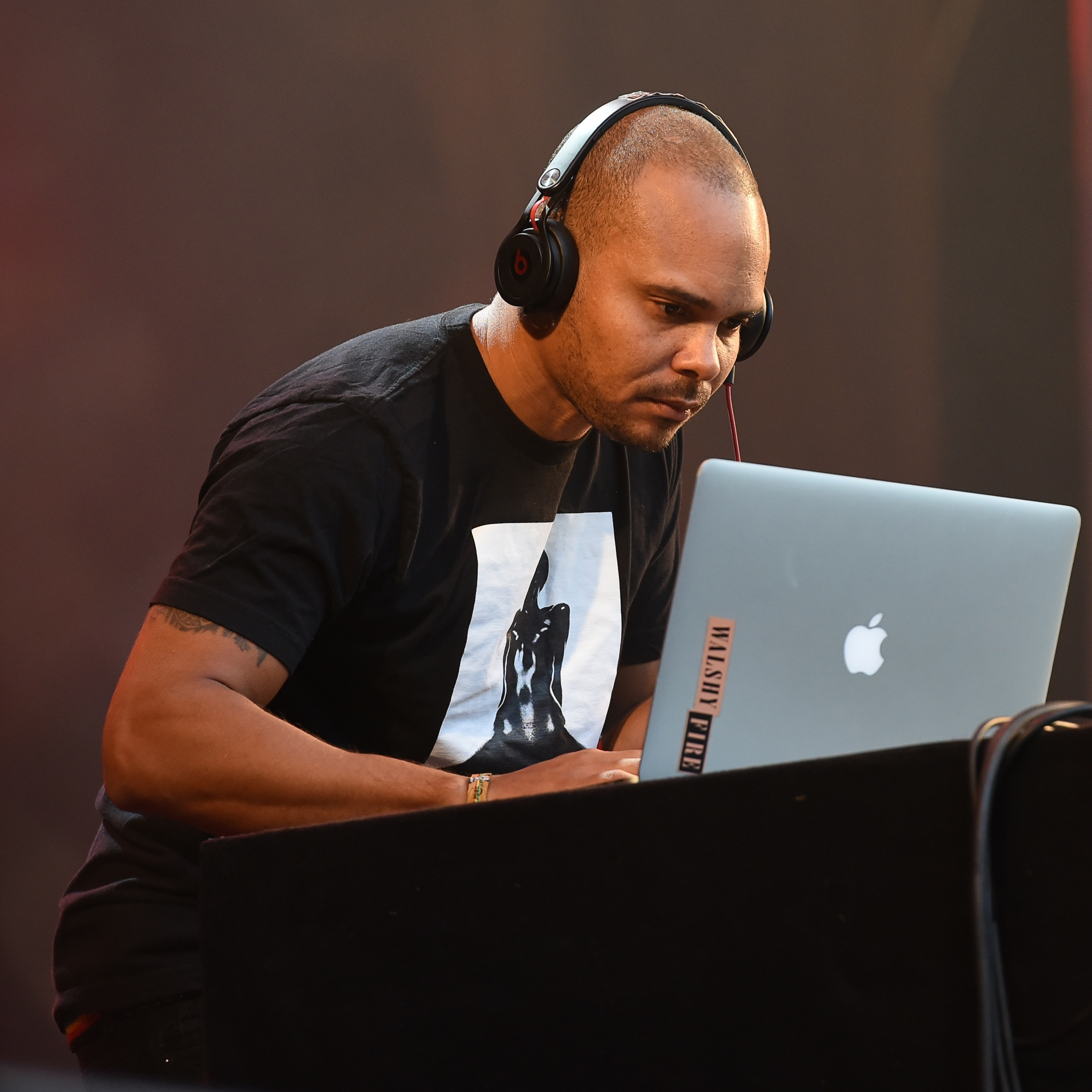
Walshy Fire at Ruhr Reggae Summer 2016

Walshy Fire has been influenced by reggae and dancehall traditions. In 2013, he said: "my sole purpose with this Major Lazer thing is to bring back some glory and international exposure [for] reggae and dancehall." His favorite reggae riddim is "The Answer" by the iconic producer Coxsone Dodd.

== Career ==
=== Major Lazer ===
Since 2012, Walshy Fire has presided as master of ceremonies for Major Lazer. In 2013, he described his role as follows:

Basically, Diplo is the selector and I'm the MC. He's the one that picks the records and mixes the records and I'm the one that's out front and presents the records to people, makes speeches that makes the records make sense, and pulls up the records. I give the crowd humor when it's time to give them humor, emotion when it's time to give them emotion, and just keep the whole vibe intense throughout the whole set.

He has contributed to production on the Major Lazer releases Apocalypse Soon and Peace is the Mission. In the latter album, he cowrote the Chronixx song "Blaze Up The Fire" and lent his vocals to "Too Original". Walshy Fire contributed to production on the Know No Better EP with Major Lazer. Walshy Fire along with Diplo & Jillionaire host the Major Lazer Lazer Sound program on Apple Music's Beats 1. With Major Lazer Walshy Fire has collaborated with artists from a variety of genres maintaining a commitment to cultural authenticity and in particular with regard to Caribbean music subgenres.

On March 6, 2016, Major Lazer made the first appearance by a major American pop group in Cuba since the reinstatement of diplomatic relations.

One year after the release of Peace is the Mission, Major Lazer announced the planned release of a new song with Justin Bieber and MØ entitled "Cold Water", which will be the lead track to the next Major Lazer album. This is a follow-up to "Lean On" which featured MØ and has been played 149 million times via Major Lazer's SoundCloud and its official music video which has received 1.4 billion YouTube views.

=== Walshy Fire Presents ===
Walshy Fire launched a label in 2015 with its roots in Jamaica's sound system culture, and extending into other genres including hip-hop. Work with Caribbean artists and the presentation of the various subgenres of their music styles to wider audiences through live sets, pre-recorded mixes and broadcast music programs has fueled the Walshy Fire Presents label concept.

=== Additional work ===
As a solo DJ, Walshy Fire has held residencies in several Miami clubs over the years. He continues to tour globally performing sets with mashups from multiple genres including reggae dancehall, roots reggae, soca, house, bass, moombahton, Latin, Afrobeat, hip-hop and old school R&B presented by MC commentary that sets up the songs for the listener. Walshy Fire performs sets as part of his signature Rum & Bass concept which mixes world-influenced dance grooves with carnival culture.

On June 7, 2019, Walshy Fire Presents: ABENG was released on Mad Decent Records. Walshy curated a first-of-its-kind conversation between Africa and the Caribbean, pairing artists from both regions on tracks spanning afrobeats, dancehall, soca and EDM. As Walshy Fire explains, "The intention of ABENG is to make the Caribbean and Africa have a conversation that is louder, and in the same studio or the same stage, at the same time."

As a producer Walshy Fire has contributed to several dancehall, reggae, and EDM projects. He is a co-producer on two songs: "Toast" & "Throne" on the Grammy-winning EP in the Reggae category by Jamaican artist Koffee entitled Rapture. "Toast" has been featured in TV and film, including the Jordan Peele major motion picture Us.

In July 2019, Walshy Fire signed a global publishing deal with Concord Music Publishing that covered all of his existing work.

In 2021 he opened the Dante's Hifi vinyl bar in Miami, Florida.

== Discography ==
=== Albums ===
- Peace Is the Mission (2015) (as Major Lazer)
- BE Inspired - Various Artists (Walshy Fire Presents 2016)
- Walshy Fire Presents: ABENG - Various Artists (Mad Decent 2019)

=== Singles ===
- "Muevelo" - DJ Moiz, Tribal Kush, Walshy Fire Feat. Bay-C (Flex Up Records 2020)
- "Throne" - Koffee producers Walshy Fire, EchoSlim, Sean Alaric, Nicko Rebel (Sony UK/Columbia 2019)
- "Hot (Bam Bam)" - Busy Signal, Walshy Fire, DJ Septik (Walshy Fire Presents 2018)
- "Toast" - Koffee producers Walshy Fire, Izy Beats (Sony UK/Columbia 2018)
- "Never Let You In" - DJ Soda, Walshy Fire (2018)
- "Love You Like Me" - Chen'Nelle Walshy Fire & Natty Rico Remix featuring Konshens (2018)
- "Yeah Yeah" - DJ Moiz, Tribal Kush, Walshy Fire (Flex Up Records 2018)
- "Dangerous" - Walshy Fire, Silva, Beatwalker, DJ Blass GIVE ME FUTURE soundtrack (Mad Decent 2017)
- "Work" - Popeye Caution (Walshy Fire Presents 2017)
- "G.O.A.T." - Mr. Vegas (Walshy Fire Presents 2017)
- "So High" - Mr. Vegas, Lizi, Walshy Fire (Walshy Fire Presents 2017)
- "Chicken and Dumplin" - Bunji Garlin (Walshy Fire Presents 2017)
- "No Laziness" - Ketchup featuring Bunji Garlin (Walshy Fire Presents 2017)
- "Hearts in the Sand" - Cutting Class & Flipo (Walshy Fire Presents 2016)
- Garmiani featuring Walshy Fire - "Voodoo" (Dim Mak Records 2016)
- Sanjin, Walshy Fire & Salvatore Ganacci - "Nah Tell Them" (Good Enuff 2016)
- Wurld featuring Walshy Fire & Shizzi - "Show You Off" (WeAreGVDS 2016)
- Machet - "Naturally" (Walshy Fire Presents 2016)
- Raekwon & Kabaka Pyramid - "Be Inspired" (Walshy Fire Presents 2016)
- Kelissa & Keznamdi - "Live for Today" (Walshy Fire Presents 2015)

=== Extended plays ===
- Know No Better EP (2018) (as Major Lazer)
- Thanks for Life Riddim EP (Walshy Fire Presents 2018)
- Top Shelf Riddim EP (Walshy Fire Presents 2018)
- Rum Xmas EP (Walshy Fire Presents 2017)
- Spread Out Riddim EP (Walshy Fire Presents 2017)
- Chicken and Dumplin EP (Walshy Fire Presents 2017)
- Confessional Riddim EP (Walshy Fire Presents 2015)
- Apocalypse Soon EP (2014) (as Major Lazer)

=== Compilations ===
- Walshy Fire: Riddimentary Selection (VP Records 2021)

== Filmography ==
=== Television ===
- Noisey Jamaica II VICE 6 episode documentary, host & presenter
- Noisey Season 1 VICE Episode 3 Miami
- Noisey Season 2 VICE Episode 2 São Paulo
