= Mi Casa =

South African band

- Origin: Johannesburg, South Africa
- Genres: Deep house, soulful house
- Years active: 2011–present
- Labels: Soul Candi Records; Universal Music
- Members: Dr. Duda (Producer); J'Something (Vocalist); Mo-T (Trumpet)
- Website: micasamusic.com

Mi Casa is a house trio based in Johannesburg, South Africa and consisting of three members, Dr. Duda (producer and pianist), J'Something (vocalist and guitarist), and Mo-T (trumpeter). The band was formed in early 2011 in Johannesburg when all three future members were at a night lounge and decided to perform together.

A few months later, they released an album titled Micasa Music, which went gold certification quickly and won several awards at the 18th Annual MTN South Africa Music Awards in 2012. The band's second studio album Su Casa (2015) reached number one in South Africa. The band then embarked on a Mi Casa Gone Global Tour. The band released their third studio album, Home Sweet Home (2013), which resulted with two chart-topping singles "Chocolate" & "Barman".

In August 2017 they released their fourth studio album Familia after nearly disbanding four months earlier.

== History ==
=== 2010-2011: Early years ===
In 2011, the trio meet at the night lounge & performed together, since then they formed Mi Casa band. Later on they formed a record label 34 Music.

=== 2011-2012: Mi Casa ===
The band received a lot of attention from the public in late 2011. Their hit single "These Streets" was taken from the album Mi Casa, which showcased the unique urban jazz sound of the band. It was not long before the band was on every major South African radio and music video chart at number 1, where it remained for weeks. The band went on to open for a number of major international acts, including The Layabouts, Reel People, Tortured Soul, and YMCMB's Canadian hip hop recording artist Drake.

Their second single from the album, "Heavenly Sent", also made every major South African radio and music video chart, and earned them South African Music Awards (SAMA) nominations for "Best Dance Album", "Album of the Year", "Group of the Year", "Newcomer of the Year", and "Record of the Year". Mi Casa's Newcomer of the Year nomination was met with controversy when some people mentioned that the group's producer, Dr. Duda, was clearly not a new artist. This single was remixed by Charles Webster, marking the first international recognition for the band.

The band went on to release their third single, "La Vida", which included a 3-D animated music video. This track was remixed by British house producer, Atjazz.

=== 2013-2016 : Su Casa; Home Sweet Home ===
On 16 August 2013, the band released their second studio album titled Su Casa, it features Black Coffee, Jimmy Nevis, Bora Viver and Mishka. The album includes singles "Dream For Love", "I Want You", "In The Mood and Your Body".

Their Su Casa topped number 1 on iTunes South Africa albums charts on its day of release.

In 2014, the band performed at Ultra Music Festival in South Africa on the Soul Candi stage. The group's estimated net worth as of November 2014 has been put by South African Revenue Service (SARS) at US$22 million. They have been nominated at the MTV Africa Music Awards (MTV MAMAs) in 2014 and 2016.

In November 2015, their third studio album Home Sweet Home was released in South Africa. The album includes collaboration of Cassper Nyovest, Big Nuz & DJ Tira, Ladysmith Black Mambazo, DJ Euphonik and Sauti Soul.

After the album was released, they embarked on Mi Casa Gone Global Tour.

=== 2017-2019: Familia ===
On 30 June 2017, "Nana" was released as the album lead single atop top 30 radio charts. On August 4, 2017, their fourth studio album titled Familia was released in South Africa.

At 24th South African Music Awards, Familia earned three nominations includes: Best dance Album, Best Engineered Album and Duo/Group of the Year.

=== 2020-present: We Made It (2020) ===
In 2020, they signed a record deal with Universal Music. On July 3, 2020, their fifth studio album We Made It was released in South Africa. The single "Mamela" was released off as second single & certified gold by the Recording industry of South Africa (RiSA) in early 2021. In 2021, the album received 2 nominations at 27th South African Music Awards for Best Produced video and Best dance album.

== Band members ==
=== Current members ===
- Dr. Duda - Producer and pianist (2011–present)
- J'Something - vocalist and guitarist (2011–present)
- Mo-T - Trumpet (2011–present)

== Personal lives ==
Mo-T's father, Kgasoane Banza, was part of the South African Afropop band Mango Groove.

J'Something is originally from Portugal. His real name is Joao da Fonseca. He moved to Port Alfred in the Eastern Cape, South Africa when he was seven years old. He was raised by his mother Maria after his parents separated. Joao completed his bachelor's degree in marketing at Stellenbosch University before moving to Johannesburg, where he was a studio manager at the SoulCandi Studios.

Dr. Duda is responsible for the music production for the band. He was part of a gospel band at his childhood church since the age of 8, played keyboards. He got his nickname from a FL Studio plug-in called "Duda". He still uses DAW software, amongst others, including Cubase, Sony Acid, Reason, and Ableton Live.

== Discography ==
- Mi Casa (2011)
- Su Casa (2013)
- Home Sweet Home (2015)
- Familia (2017)
- We Made It (2020)

== Tours ==
- Mi Casa Concert (2015)
- Mi Casa Gone Global Tour (2015)

== Awards and nominations ==
Year	Award	Category	Nominated work	Result	Ref
2011	Metro FM Music Awards	Best Newcomer		Nominated	
2011	Metro FM Music Awards	Song of the Year	"These Streets"	Nominated	
2011	Metro FM Music Awards	Best Music Video	"These Streets"	Nominated	
2011	Metro FM Music Awards	Best Newcomer		Nominated	
2011	Metro FM Music Awards	Best Group Album	'Mi Casa'	Nominated	
2012	18th South African Music Awards	Best Dance Album	'Mi Casa'	Won	
2012	18th South African Music Awards	Album of the Year	'Mi Casa'	Nominated	
2012	18th South African Music Awards	Group of the Year	'Mi Casa'	Won	
2012	18th South African Music Awards	Newcomer of the Year	'Mi Casa'	Nominated	
2012	18th South African Music Awards	Record of the Year	'Mi Casa'	Won	
2013	The Headies	Best African Artiste		—N/a	
2014	MTV Africa Music Awards 2014	Best Group		Nominated	
2014	MTV Africa Music Awards 2014	Artist of the Year		Nominated	
2014	MTV Africa Music Awards 2014	Song of the Year	"Jika"	Nominated	
2016	MTV Africa Music Awards 2016	Best Group		Nominated	
2018	Dance Music Awards South Africa	Best Live Act		Nominated	
2021	27th SAMAs	Best produced Music Video	"Mamela"	Nominated	
2021	27th SAMAs	Best Dance Album	We made It	Nominated	
