= 2005 Kisima Music Awards =

Kenyan music awards

The 2005 Kisima Music Awards recognised and rewarded music talent in East Africa. The Kenyan based Kisima Music Awards were held on July 2, 2005 in Nairobi. It continued the expansion begun in the previous year, incorporating both entrants and acts from across East Africa.

The ceremony was hosted by Tedd Kwaka, Kevin Ombajo and Ugandan Diana Muyera. This year included performances from multiple artists including Blu*3 and Pilipili.

This year was marked by difficulties. Tedd Josiah stepped down as CEO of the awards amid controversy surrounding his winning of the Best Producer Award, appointing Victor Mayeya Odwori in his place. Days before the event there was discussion of cancelling altogether due to poor sponsorship. The restaurant hosting the event opted to pay the suppliers which allowed the award show to continue.

== Winners ==
Category	Winner
Afro Fusion	Kaz
Asian Music	Gupz
Boomba Rap	Pili Pili
Boomba Pop	Xyzee
Contemporary Gospel	Esther Wahome
Eastern Benga	Musaimo
Gospel Ensembles	Ruth Wamuyu
Hip hop	Ukoo Fulani MauMau
R&B	Mbuvi
Rap	Bamboo
Reggae/Ragga	Redsan
Traditional	Kenge Kenge
Best Artist/Group from Tanzania	TID
Best Artist/Group from Uganda	Blu*3
Best Music Video from Uganda	Blu*3
Western Benga	Peter Khayadi
Best Music Video from Kenya	Harry Kimani
Best Song	Harry Kimani
Best Collaboration	Pili Pili Feat. Ratatat
Best Male Artist	Pili Pili
Best Female Artist	Nyota Ndogo
Most Promising Artist	Maximum Melodies
Best Group	Kleptomaniax
Producer of the Year	Clemo (Calif Records)
