= Odi Pop =

Kenyan music genre

Odi pop
- Other names: Gengeton
- Stylistic origins: Boomba; Genge; Dancehall; Hip hop; Reggaeton
- Cultural origins: 2000s, Kenya

Fusion genres
- Boomba; Genge music

Odi pop is a Kenyan music style which involves localized hip hop and draws influences from reggae and dancehall music to build on an African rhythm base performed in sing-along rap in heavy Kiswahili/Sheng language. There are several sub-genres stemming from this umbrella term including Gengeton, Dabonge, Debe and others. The music is spearheaded by Kenyan youths and most of them are pursuing their careers as music groups opposed to solo careers.

The term Odi Pop was coined in 2019 by musician and music scholar Dan Aceda, who is popular for Benga music. He described the naming on The Elephant:

For the sake of definitional simplicity, I am proposing the collective term “Odi-pop” to refer to all the sub styles of this new sound. I am aware of each group having named their style separately e.g Gengetone, Dabonge style and so on and my definition is not trying to replace that. For me this musical style is basically pop but with a common sound (hip-hop rap influence blended with Caribbean phrase and rhyme schemes, all constructed on an African rhythm base and performed in sing-along rap with heavy Kiswahili/Sheng inflections). My naming structure is borrowed from K-Pop.

== History ==
=== Origin ===
Odi pop earliest roots can be traced back to early 2000 Kenyan gospel music which was faintly related to the church. The music at the time was heavily driven by "message" and "meaning" which resulted in demand for feel good music. Gospel Superstars like Rufftone and Daddy Owen are considered pioneers in feel good Christian pop music that broke away from the traditional worship style to music that had more rhythm and was more relatable to the youth.

In the early 1990s and 2000s, the Kenyan government and church had massive control over what was aired as there was only one state controlled broadcaster. The government clamped down on several secular artists who were considered enemies of state, resulting in the rise of Kenyan gospel music as the style was under an acceptable theme.

In 2002, Gidi Gidi Maji Maji released 'Unbwogable' which was adopted by Kenyan politicians; future President Mwai Kibaki and future Kenyan Prime Minister Raila Odinga as the official campaign 2002 election campaign sound track. Ogopa DeeJays, a Kenyan record from the late 1990s was rising to prominence during this period developing music stars like E-sir, K- Rupt, Nameless, Amani, and others. Ogopa Deejays would become one of the most influential record labels in Kenya with their sound called Boomba Music (sometimes referred to as Kapuka). Boomba is one of the foundations of Odi Pop.

During the same period, a wave of music called Genge was popularized by hip hop artist Jua Cali and Nonini from Calif Records. The term Genge was coined by their producer Clemo. A paper titled The Poetics of Genge: Jua Cali's Niimbe was presented at the 26th annual MELUS conference and 6th conference of the United States Association for Commonwealth Literature and Language Studies (USACLALS), University of Santa Clara, California. In the following years artists like Mejja, Madtraxx, Jimwat and others played a critical role in shaping the Genge sound.

In October 2016, rapper Collo from music group Kleptomaniax released 'Bazokizo' featuring Bruz Newton which is considered a turning point for Odi Pop. The viral nature of the song and numerous airplay brought Odi pop to mainstream media and opened the door for other Odi pop musicians including Timeless Noel and Jabidii. The style has emerged from the Nairobi area mainly in the Eastlands region including Kayole, Dandora, Umoja, Dagoretti, and Rongai.

== Rise of Odi Pop ==
In 2008, President Kibaki signed a deal with the UAE government that brought high speed broadband internet to Kenya by under-sea optic fibre cables. This enabled Kenyan music to develop freely without interference from politicians and the church. Prior to that, a small group of gatekeepers were trusted by the media to select what could be heard while muting that which they frowned upon. The main medium to share the music is video-sharing website YouTube. Researchers ODIPODEV noted the impact of affordable fast internet on Odi Pop:

The fact that the rise of the Internet in Kenya has been driven by the smartphone has meant that the power of publishing is not just with the creator but with the creator’s audience as well. Every single person today who consumes content online also has the potential to create something new from the content they’ve just consumed. In the case of ‘Odi pop’, the songs seem to come with a long tail of user-generated content for the artist’s audiences to snack on – that is, commentary, reactions, reviews or simply clipping highlights from the content piece, created by the audience themselves.

Kenya is ranked second in Africa after Madagascar for internet speed.

=== Dance Craze and meme culture ===
Rapper Collo's collaboration with Bruz Newton, Bazokizo helped popularize Odi pop to the mainstream Kenyan media. The song was nominated for Groove Song of the Year and Groove Afro pop at the 2017 Groove Awards. The dance video was choreographed by Bruz Newton and has over 3 million views on YouTube.

More viral videos would follow which helped in popularizing Odi pop in Kenya. On September 15, 2017, Timeless Noel released 'Odi Dance' which was a viral sensation. The song was nominated for Breakthrough song of the Year at Pulse Music Video Awards. Another dance was popularized by Timeless Noel and Jabidii, 'Kanyaga Lami'. Fan videos were uploaded online featuring high school kids, youth, club videos and many iterations of memes which helped to popularize this type of music.
