= Jimwat =

Kenyan rapper (born 1985)

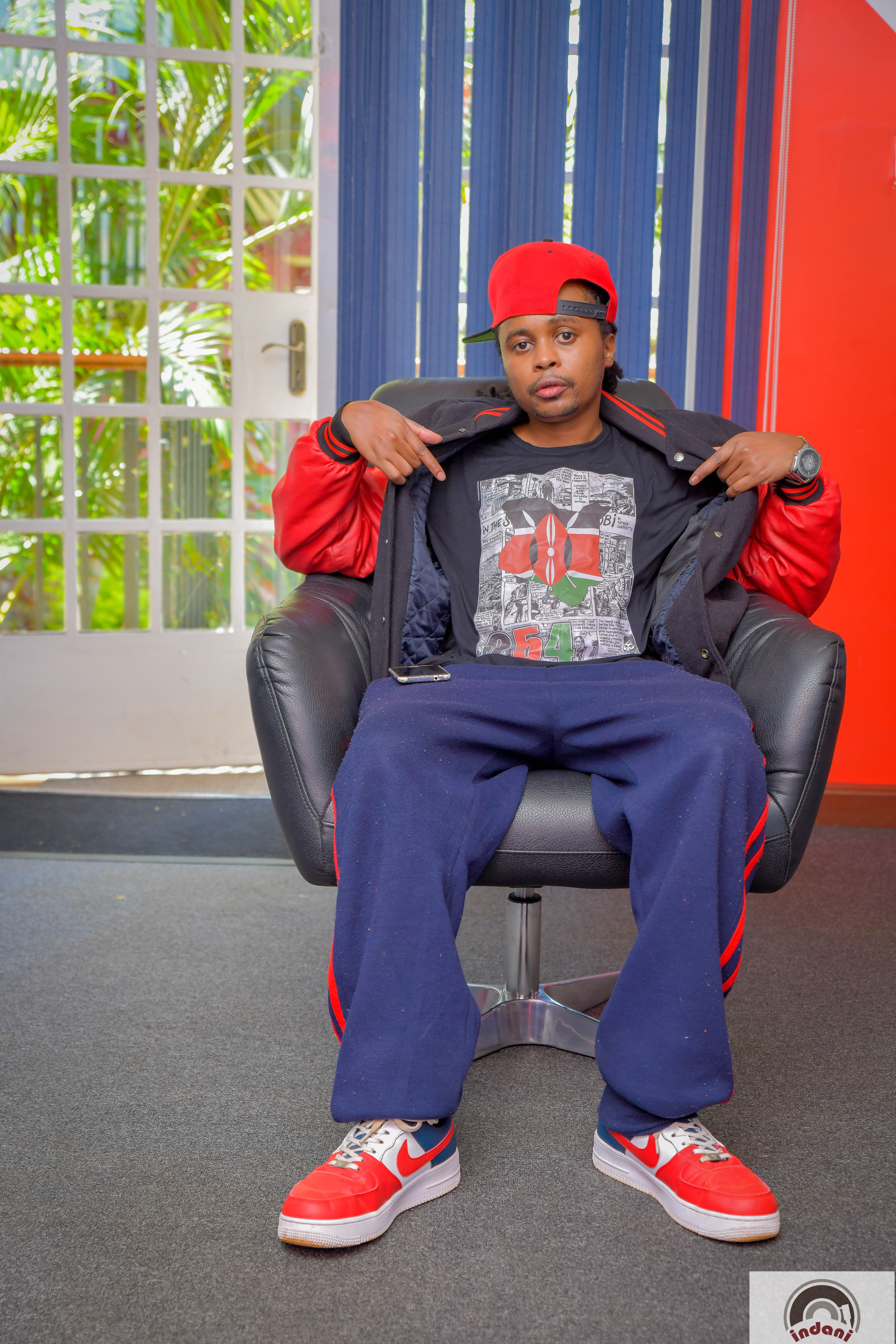
- Jimwat in 2020

Background information
- Born: James Wathigo Mburu; May 21, 1985 (age 41); Nairobi, Kenya
- Origin: Nairobi, Kenya
- Genres: Kenyan hip hop, genge
- Occupations: Rapper, record producer
- Instruments: Vocals, keyboard, sampler
- Years active: 2003–present
- Label: Calif Records
- Website: YouTube channel

James Wathigo Mburu (born May 21, 1985), better known by his stage names Jimwat (stylized Jimw@t) and Jimweezy, is a Kenyan genge rapper.

== Personal life ==
The name Jimwat is coined from his names, James Wathigo. He was brought up in Kabete, Nairobi, Kenya and went to Musa Gitau Primary School and Chinga Boys High School later transferring to Kikuyu Secondary School, Thogoto. After his O levels he took a computer course and later studied graphic design. He started rapping while he was in Class 7.

== Music career ==
While still in Form 4, Jimwat went to Calif Records and recorded his first song, Sema Nami Sweetie (Sheng for talk to me sweetie). It was not released until he completed his O levels. On clearing high school, Jimwat released it and he was shocked to hear it on 98.4 Capital FM a few days after its release. Later, other stations followed suit. The same year, he was featured by Rhaptaz, (a group composed of Gabu of P-Unit) in Paulina which became a club hit and was used in the Close-Up Dance-o-Mania competition. He also did videos for the songs that same year. Later on, he was featured in the song Adila by Pararo and Riziki. He was also featured in Jua Cali’s Kwa Album Yangu (Sheng for In My Album) and Wanakimbia (Kiswahili for They're Running), which are in Juacalisekta, a mini album by Jua Cali. He then went on to pursue a solo career. In the same year, he released his most popular single to date, Under 18, in which he featured Meg C in the video.

Other songs he has worked on are Mpaka Che with Pilipili, Tunakatika (Sheng for We're Dancing) with Wambo-E and Chakula Kinywaji (Kiswahili for Food Drink) with Jua Cali, which was featured in his album Ngeli ya Genge. Jua Cali's single, Sitoi Kitu Kidogo(Kiswahili for I am not bribing), also featuring Jimwat, addresses the issue of corruption in Kenya and was included in the National Anti-Corruption Steering Campaign in 2008.

In 2009, he was involved in a UN peace campaign where he collaborated in a peace song with artists Jua Cali, Mejja, Nyota Ndogo, Mr Lenny among other top artists in Kenya. He also worked on an anti-corruption song, Simama, (Kiswahili for Stand Up) with top Kenya artists. He later released a mellow jam, Fall in Love. His latest release, entitled Fan Wangu (Sheng for My Fan), is a dedication to his loyal fans.

Jimwat's comeback was marked with the release of the album titled Genge Nijenge; The Lost Tapes! (Kiswahili for Build Me Genge!). Jimwat later worked with artists such as Das Walanguzi, Jedidah and Pace Kenya among others as he bettered his musical comeback. Jimwat had taken a hiatus from the Music scene but got back in 2019 with new Genge #EduTainment Songs.

His recent release was an E.P. titled Jimweezy; A Genge Hip-hop Story that was met with successful critical acclaim around November 2023.

He is currently involved in a countrywide talent search scouting & helping nurture Kenyan talents from the grass-roots to internationally recognized status. The Myogenic Talent Show kick-start edition was in the Coast Province, Mombasa at the beginning of February 2024 and continued to the Nakuru edition in March later touring the major Kenyan counties with a final in Nairobi and a mentorship program for the winners that will see them tour the U.S.A showcasing their nurtured talents.

== Awards ==
Year	Nominated work	Event	Award	Result
2006	Under 18	2006 Chaguo La Teeniez Awards	Favourite New Artist	Won
2006	Under 18	2007 Kisima Music Awards	N/A (4 Awards)	Nominated
