= Size 8 =

Kenyan singer, songwriter and actress

- Born: Linet Masiro Munyali; 4 August 1987 (age 38); Nairobi, Kenya
- Other names: Linet Muraya
- Citizenship: Kenyan
- Occupations: Singer; songwriter; actress
- Years active: 2008–present
- Spouse: Samuel "DJ Mo" Muraya (m. 2013)
- Children: 2
- Musical career
- Genres: R&B; afro pop; contemporary christian music; urban contemporary gospel
- Instrument: Vocals
- Label: Calif Records (former)

Linet Munyali (born 4 August 1987), professionally known as Size 8, is a Kenyan singer, songwriter, and actress. Initially gaining recognition for her mainstream music with hits like "Shamba Boy" and "Moto," she later transitioned to creating gospel music, releasing her debut gospel single, "Mateke," in April 2013. In addition to her music career, Size 8 appeared in the legal comedy Mashtaka in a minor acting role.

== Early life and education ==
Born on August 4, 1987, Size 8 was raised in Maringo Estate, a historic residential area in the Eastlands region of Nairobi, Kenya. She is the youngest of six siblings born to a Ugandan father and a Kenyan mother, both serving as clergy. Growing up in a religious household, she demonstrated academic excellence and artistic potential early on. She secured a scholarship to State House Girls High School in Nairobi's Kilimani area, near State House, and later attended Hillcrest School in Karen, Kenya.

== Career ==
Size 8's music career began when she was discovered by Clemo, a Kenyan producer and co-founder of Calif Records, following a local audition. She released "Shamba Boy", "Silali" and "Vidonge". In April 2013, Size 8 revealed to have transitioned to recording gospel music due to a personal spiritual transformation. She felt a deep commitment to her faith, which led her to shift her focus and align her music with her beliefs. She released her first gospel single, "Mateke," on that same year.

After her change of genres, she released popular songs such as "Moto," "Yuko na Wewe," "Jemedari," and "Afadhali Yesu."

== Personal life ==
Size 8 married Samuel Muraya, a Kenyan DJ and music producer known as DJ Mo, in September 2013 and had two children. The couple divorced after 11 years of marriage, citing personal challenges and a period of reconciliation. On Valentine's Day 2025, DJ Mo surprised Size 8 with a proposal, rekindling their relationship. Just days later, on 18 February 2025, the couple held a private wedding ceremony at JS Meadows in Sigona, Kiambu County, renewing their vows.

== Filmography ==
- Mashtaka

== Awards and nominations ==
Year	Association	Category	Nominated work	Result	Ref(s)
2014	Groove Awards	Video of the Year	"Mateke"	Won	
2014	Groove Awards	Female Artist of the Year	Herself	Nominated	
2014	Groove Awards	Song of the Year	"Mateke"	Nominated	
