= Willy Paul =

Kenyan artist and songwriter

- Born: Wilson Abubakar Radido; 1 September 1993 (age 32); Mathare, Kenya
- Other names: Willis Paulson; Abu; Willy Paul Msafi; Willy Pozze
- Occupation(s): Musician, vocalist, songwriter
- Years active: 2010–present
- Spouse: Saron Ayelegn
- Parent: Paul Radido
- Awards: Groove Award for Male Artist of the year; Groove Award Artist of the year (2012 Afrima Awards)
- Musical career
- Genres: Secular Music; pop; soul
- Instrument: Vocals
- Website: www.willypaulmsafi.com

Wilson Abubakar Radido is a Kenyan artist and songwriter from Nairobi. He is the chief executive officer and founder of Saldido International Entertainment.

Paul was named male artist of the year at the 2013 Groove Awards alongside his mentor Gloria Muliro, who took the female artist of the year award. Some of his well-known singles are "I do" featuring Alaine from Jamaica, " Njiwa" featuring Nandy from Tanzania, "Hallelujah" featuring Nandy, "Sikireti" featuring Cecil from Jamaica, "Nobody" featuring Yemi Alade from Nigeria, "Mmmh" featuring Rayvanny from Tanzania, "Jigi Jigi, Kanungo, Malingo", and "You Never Know" which earned him recognition and a US tour.

He first gained recognition after recording the song "Rabuka" and later "Sitolia" with Muliro. The latter sparked controversy after several claims by Willy that he was not earning much from the song because Muliro allegedly owned exclusive copyrights to the song. They settled their differences and recorded another hit song, "Kitanzi". In 2012, he was nominated for the Kisima Music Awards' Male Artist of the year managed by David Grey.

== Early life ==
Wilson Abubakar Opondo Radido was born to Mr. and Mrs. Paul Radido in September 1993 in Mathare slums. His father was a carpenter, while his wife, was a hairdresser until 2011, Wilson dropped out of school in 2011 due to financial constrain. He took Juakali jobs to generate income to support his mother.

== Career ==
His first hit was "Rabuka". His major breakthrough came in 2010. He later co-authored his first single "Sitolia" with Muliro, which was a reflection of his life history, depicting his struggles and giving himself a renewed hope that God had brought him to the limelight. His first album, You never know launched on 5 December 2013 in a ceremony at KICC, graced by Daddy Owen, Ben Githae, Gloria Muliro, DK Kwenye Beat, Ben Bahati, Bahati, Men Of God (MOG), Size 8, Mr Seed, Shiru Wa GP, Betty Bayo, Danny Gift, DJ Sadic and DJ Mo. The album included, "You never know", "Lala Salama", "Mpenzi" and "Kitanzi".

Paul toured the US in 2014, performing in churches in 12 states. The tour began on 10 March in Sacramento, California. He performed alongside artiste Polly Odotte at the House of Glory Church. He then headed to Neema Gospel Church in Dallas, Texas, and, on 15 March, performed at St Louisiana, Missouri. On 29–30 March, Willy ministered to the audience at Neema Community Church in Overland Park, Kansas. He concluded his tour on 27 April in Las Vegas, Nevada.

Paul beat Bahati with his "Tam Tam" song featuring Size 8 and managed to win to Mdundo Awards; Most Downloaded Gospel Artist and Most Downloaded Male Single. He won four nominations for the awards with "Tam Tam", a collaboration with Size 8 released in 2014 granting him Collabo of the Year, Video of the Year, Song of the year and Male Artist of the Year.

He collaborated with hip-hop artist Khaligraph Jones on "Bora uhai" and Alaine on "I Do".

Paul has received constant accusations of secularism from various quarters.

On April 30, 2024, Kenyan musician Willy Paul released his third studio album, titled "Beyond Gifted." The album features 14 tracks and blends various genres, including Afropop, Bongo Flava, and Dancehall.

== Chart performance ==
"Jigi Jigi" peaked at number one in all major charts in Kenya, including Mdundo Weekly Top 100, the Top 40 Singles Chart, and the Local Top 20 Hits on Music Charts

== Philanthropy ==
Paul set up a foundation in Kenya to help needy people in the area. He helped children to get access to basic education and healthcare.

== Discography ==
Year	Title
2019	mmmh" ft Rayvanny
2019	"Hallelujah" ft Nandy
2019	"Nishikilie" ft Alikiba
2019	"Chuchuma"
2019	"Bure Kabisa"
2019	"Uuh mama" ft meddy
2018	Valary tribute song
2018	Kanungo
2018	Sikireti ft Ce'cile
2018	Nisamehe
2018	Bora Uhai
2018	"Imani"
2018	Njiwa
2012	Sitolia
2012	Mpenzi
2013	You Never Know
2013	Lala Salama
2013	Missi
2014	Kitanzi
2014	Tam Tam
2014	Mamangu
2015	Vigelegele
2015	Mapenzi
2016	"Take it Slow"
2016	"Fanya"
2016	"Tiga wana"
2017	I do ft Alaine
2024	keroro
2024	"Sheryl"
