= Kanyeria =

Kenyan record producer and songwriter

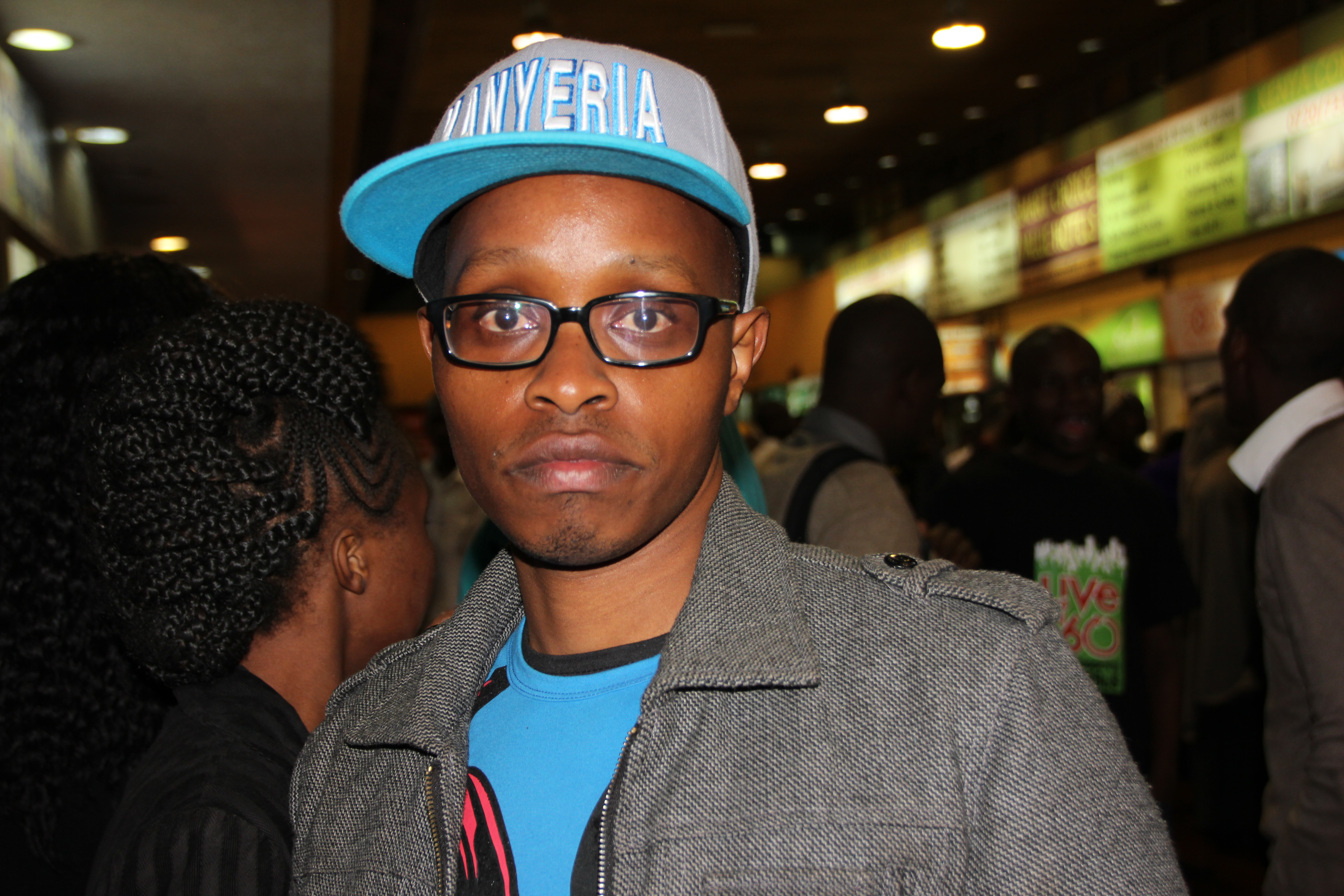
- Kanyeria in 2012

Background information
- Born: Nairobi, Kenya
- Genres: Hip hop, RNB, reggae, dancehall
- Occupation: Record producer
- Website: www.kanyeria.com

Kanyeria is a Kenyan music producer, composer, sound engineer and song writer based in Nairobi, Kenya but has worked with artists and record labels in Kenya and Tanzania.

Kanyeria produced "Kenya we pray" a song by 8 Kenyan artists seeking to remind young Kenyans to be patriotic.

In 2011, joined Bernsoft Studios where he worked with Kenyan artists like Jua Cali, P-Unit, Collo, Didge, Big Pin, Juliani, Joey Muthengi and others.

Kanyeria has also featured in a number of songs as a singer.
