= Eric Wainaina =

Eric Wainaina may refer to:

- Erick Wainaina (born 1973), Kenyan marathon runner
- Eric Wainaina (musician) (born 1973), Kenyan singer and songwriter
