= Genge =

Music genre

- Stylistic origins: Hip hop, dancehall, Traditional African music, Reggaeton
- Cultural origins: 1990s, Nairobi, Kenya
- Typical instruments: Rapping, Vocals, Keyboard, Sampler
- Derivative forms: Kenyan hip hop

Subgenres
- Ghipuka, Gengetone

Regional scenes
- Kenya

Genge music is a genre of hip-hop music influenced by dancehall, originating from Nairobi, Kenya in the 1990s. The term "Genge" was coined by producer Clemo and popularized by Kenyan rappers Jua Cali and Nonini at Calif Records. The genre is commonly performed in Sheng, a mixture Swahili, English and various local dialects. The word "Genge" itself comes from Sheng slang, meaning "a group or a mass of people."

== Origins and characteristics ==
As Kenyan urban music became more popular, Kenyan artists and music fans were missing a common name for their music, and many names were suggested. Among them were Boomba music, kapuka, and gemba. Around this time, Kenyan rapper Nonini started a campaign to popularize the term "genge" to refer to Kenyan urban music and also specifically to music by artists on Calif Records.

Calif-style genge was founded by Clement "Clemo" Rapudo of Calif Records and originated in California Estate, Nairobi. It was popularized by rappers Nonini, with his song Manzi wa Nairobi, and Jua Cali, with the songs Ngeli ya Genge, Nipe Asali, and Ruka.

Due to a disagreement on the definition of Kenyan urban music, the name genge is now more commonly used to describe music from Calif Records. However, genge is easily identified by its rapping style and conversational rhythm format that make a song sound like a casual discussion in Sheng.

The most notable genge artists are Nonini, P-Unit, Jua Cali, Influx Swagga, Flexx, Jimw@t, Rat-a-Tat, Alpha Msanii, Lady S (deceased), Kleptomaniax, and Pili Pili, among others. Nonini was continuously the most popular artist on Calif Records between the years 2002 and 2004; Nonini is the self-titled Godfather of Genge.

Genge has given rise to other subgenres, such as the Ghipuka, popularized by Kenrazy and Gengetone. The main line has also developed, for instance with America-based producer Keggah adapting genge into a form that has proved popular among Kenyans.

In June 2018, an Umoja-based boy band called Ethic Entertainment came out with their debut song "Lamba Lolo," garnering over 4 million views on YouTube. Other boy bands like Boondocks Gang, Ochungulo Family, Sailors Gang, Wakali Wao, Angry Panda, Wakadinali, Vintage Clan, and Rico Gang produced songs that created the subgenre Gengetone.

Genge songs generally talk about struggles in the ghetto, with most songs taking on a storytelling format where the main singer is reliving or sharing an event they witnessed with their friends and the lesson the event has taught them. These events often, but not always, revolve around sex, drugs, women, or interactions with people in positions of power over them.

Some of the most popular genge tracks include:

Artist	Title
Nonini	Manzi wa Nairobi
Nonini	Moyoni
Nonini	Kadhaa
Nonini	We Kamu
Jua Cali	Ruka
Jua Cali	Bongo La Biashara
Jua Cali	Ngeli Ya Genge
Jua Cali	Kiasi
Jua Cali	Bidii Yangu
	Kwaheri
Pilipili	Morale (featuring Rat-a-tat)
Pilipili	Kamata Dame
Jimw@t	Under 18, Sitoi Kitu Kidogo

== See also ==
- Kenyan hip hop
- Boomba, another form of Kenyan hip-hop
