= Hardstone (musician) =

Kenyan musician (born 1977)

- Born: Mbaruku Harrison Ngunjiri Maina; Kenya
- Occupation: Musician
- Years active: 1997–present

Hardstone (real name Mbaruku Harrison Ngunjiri Maina, born August 17, 1977) is a Kenyan musician. His music is a mixture of ragga, reggae and hip hop. He sings in English, Swahili and Kikuyu languages. He is a pioneer urban style artist in Kenya and topped the Kenyan music scene for a while in the late 1990s.

He emerged in 1997 with popular hit "Uhiki" and an album named Nuting but de Stone, produced by Tedd Josiah of Sync Sound Studios and released internationally by German-based Kelele Records. Guest artist on the album were Fiona Mungai (of Shadz O'blak) and Eric Wainaina. The album contained two versions of Uhiki: his original, and Pinye's remix. The latter version contains samples of Sexual Healing by Marvin Gaye. At the 1997 Kisima Music Awards, Hardstone won the "Best new artist of the year" category.

He recorded a second album, Ziwe Nkulu, which remained unreleased when he moved to the United States in 1998. He left Kenya to advance his career, and in 2003, he released the album Hardstory. The song "Uhiki (Pinye's remix)" was also on the African Groove compilation released by Putumayo World Music in 2003.

In 2008, he recorded the 12-track album Stone Republic on Vigintillion Records. Featuring the music of Hardstone, the Godfather of Kenyan Hip Hop, with producers including Edward "Eddie Hands" Rollins, and Paul "Arkitekt" Himmel.

In 2010, Hardstone created "Stone Island Entertainment" an Independent Record Label.

On 9 March 2015, he landed a recording deal with Atlantic Records, making him the first East African to sign for the label.
