= Lucas Mkenda =

Tanzanian singer

- Also known as: Mr. Nice
- Born: Lucas Mkenda; 1978 (age 46–47); Moshi, Kilimanjaro Region, Tanzania
- Origin: Kilimanjaro
- Genres: Bongo flava; Afro pop
- Occupation: Singer • Songwriter • Entertainer • Entrepreneur
- Instrument: Vocals
- Years active: 1999–present

Lucas Mkenda popularly known as Mr. Nice is a Tanzanian veteran singer and one of the most celebrated vocalists in East Africa dominating East African music in the early 2000s alongside Jose Chameleone of Uganda and Jua Cali of Kenya.

Mkenda went professional in 1999 with the release of his debut album, Kidali Po, and towards the end of 2002, he released his second album, Rafiki, also his songs; "Kikulacho", "Fagilia Wote" and "Kuku Kapanda Baiskeli" were among major hit songs of his career. He was famous for his 'Takeu' style, that comes from the initials of Tanzania, Kenya and Uganda respectively. It incorporates elements from all three countries.

== Personal life ==
Lucas Mkenda was born in 1978, a Chaga in Moshi, Tanzania. He currently resides in Kenya with his wife whom they have two daughters. In 2021, Mr. Nice's mother who was living in Moshi, Tanzania passed away.

== Controversies ==
Many controversies revolved around Mkenda as his music career went down. Things went south when he visited South Africa, at Mzansi, Mkenda experienced an alarming downward spiral that was attributed to alcoholism and hedonism. As he disappeared for a while, rumors had it that he raped a little girl and was arrested, more word went around that he had died. On 13 December, one of East African websites sensationally claimed that Mkenda was dead. A few hours later, it turned out to be just a rumour after the musician through his socials assured his fans that he was alive and well.

Mkenda has been struggling to revive his music career, at some point he migrated from Tanzania to reside in Uganda where he complained about cyber and physical attacks he faced that nearly costed his life. In 2013 he resided in Kenya and signing with a record label before being dropped just a few months later, also claims that he was HIV positive and being broke were everywhere however, he came out to deny all these claims publicly.

Mkenda had a long rivalry with a Tanzanian rap artist, Dudu Baya that lasted to more than two decades. The two Tanzanian musical artists reached a stage of putting on a fight back in 2001, an action that was criticized by government and music supporters.

== Discography ==
=== Albums ===
- Kidali po
- Rafiki

=== Singles ===
- Kikulacho
- Fagilia
- Nakuita
- Kidalipo
- Awe mama we
- Tabia gani
- Mama
- Tuvumiliane
- Kila mtu na demu wake
- Kuku kapanda baiskeli
- Mbona umeniacha
- King'asti
