= TID (musician) =

Tanzanian singer

- Born: 1982 (age 42–43)
- Citizenship: Tanzania
- Occupations: Singer, Rapper, Actor

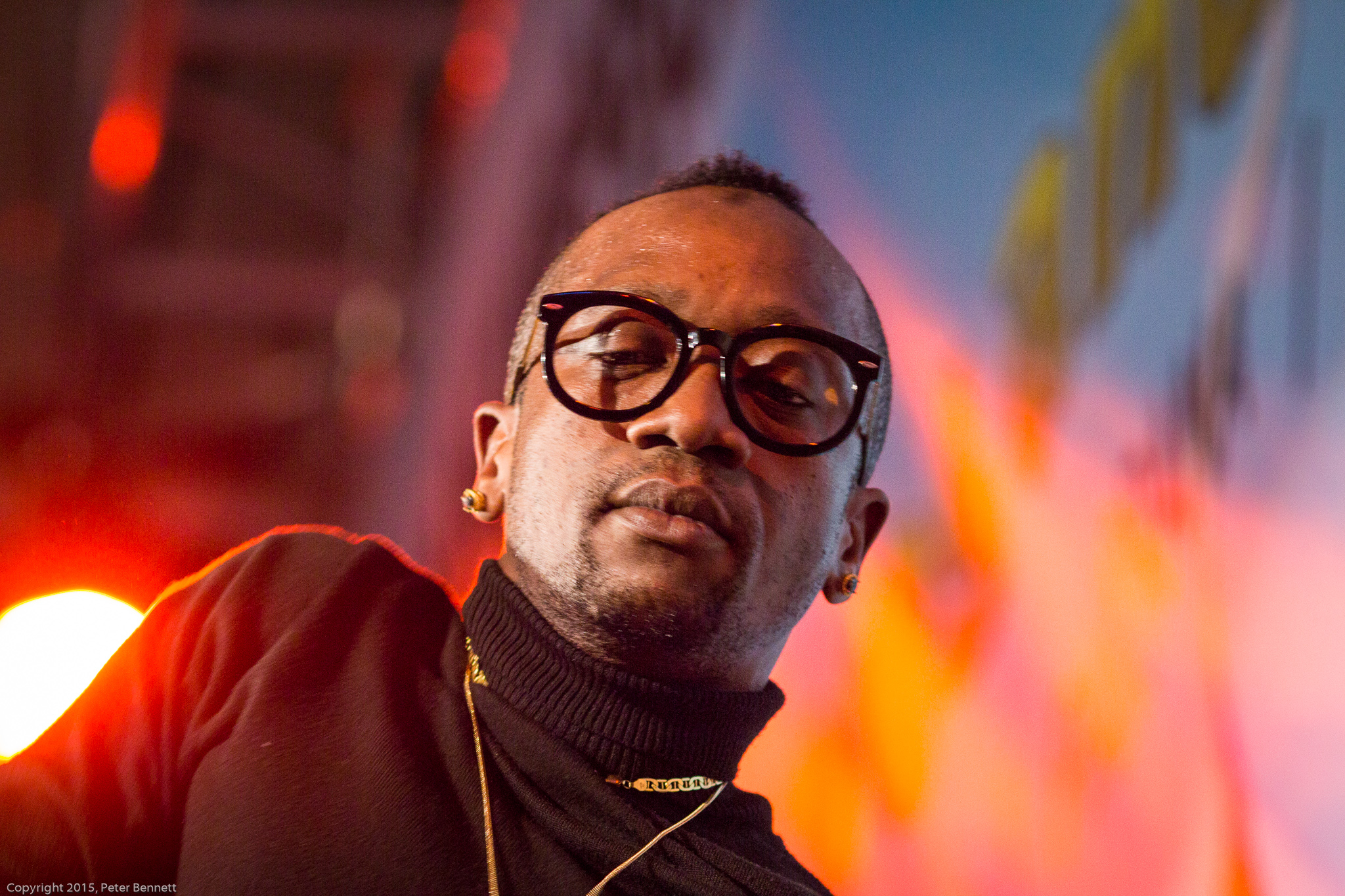
TID at the 2015 Zanzibar International Film Festival.

TID is a Bongo Flava musician from Tanzania, whose real name is Khalid Mohamed (born 1981 in Dar es Salaam). TID is an acronym for Top in Dar, in which "Dar" refers to Dar es Salaam, his hometown. He is best known for his hits Kiuno, Nyota Yako, We Dada, Zeze, and Siamini.

== Biography ==
He started singing in 1994 with a group known as Black Gangsters. He went solo five years later. At the age of 21, he signed with Poa Records. His first single, Mrembo was released in March 2002. He also played the lead role in the film Girlfriend, a film about the Bongo Flava scene.

He has toured in East African countries, the United Kingdom, and the United States. He performs with a live band called Top Band.

His hit Zeze is included in the Global Soul compilation by Putumayo World Music.

In 2008, he was sentenced to one year in prison for an assault. He was released four months later.

In May 2010, it was reported that he was assaulted by professional basketball player Hasheem Thabeet in a nightclub in Tanzania. Thabeet, through his agent, denied being involved in any altercation that night, although he was present at the nightclub.

== Discography ==
- "Sauti ya Dhahabu" (2002)
- "Burudani (2005)
- "Kiuno Viuono" (2012)
- "The Vocalist (2019)

== Awards ==
- 2003 Tanzania Music Awards - Best Male Artist & Best R&B Artist
- 2005 Kisima Music Awards - Best Artist/Group from Tanzania
- 2008 Kisima Music Awards - Video of the Year from Tanzania ("Nyota Yako")
