= Alaine Laughton =

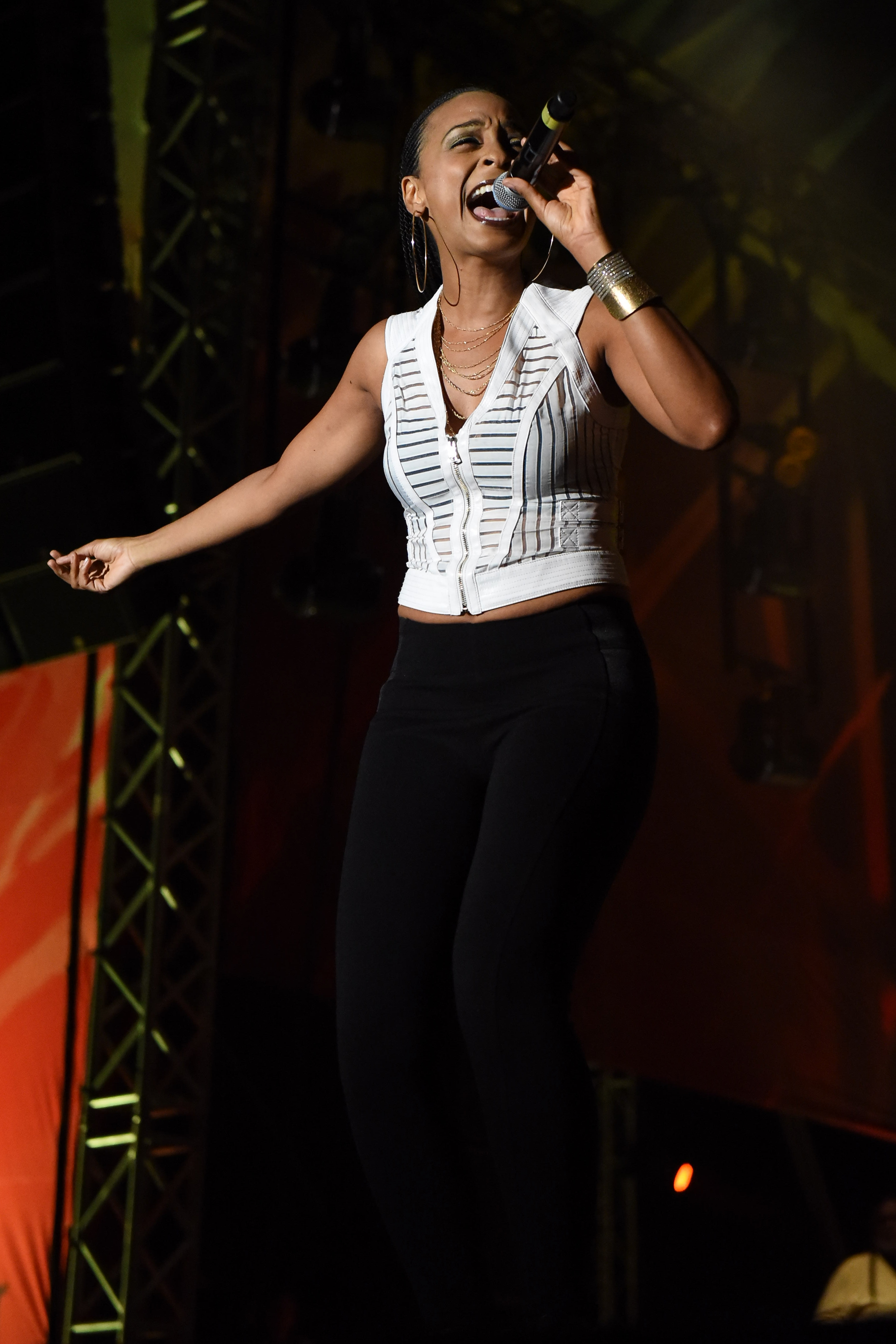
- Laughton performing at the 2016 Ruhr Reggae Summer festival in Mülheim, Germany

Background information
- Also known as: Alaine
- Born: September 21, 1978 (age 48); Toms River, New Jersey, United States
- Origin: Kingston, Jamaica / New Jersey, United States
- Genres: Dancehall, R&B, reggae / ska
- Years active: 2003–present
- Website: myspace.com/alainemusic

Alaine Laughton (was born September 21, 1978) is a Jamaican-American singer.

== Early life ==
Alaine was born in the United States and moved to Jamaica at the age of 3. Both her parents are Jamaican.<

== 1998–2004 ==
In 1988, Alaine appeared in movie Clara's Heart alongside Whoopi Goldberg. Through the late 1990s and early 2000s, Alaine lived in the United States and did songwriting and singing back up for Rocafella artists such as Cam'ron and Freeway.

She moved back to Jamaica in the summer of 2004 to focus on her own music after working in investment banking at JP Morgan Chase.

== 2005–present ==
In 2005 "No Ordinary Love" was her breakthrough single. She has released several hits including 'Deeper', 'Dreaming of You', 'Sacrifice', 'Rise in Love', 'Born To Win', 'Bye, Bye, Bye', and 'You are Me'. Her debut album, titled Sacrifice, was released in early 2008. Her album, titled Luv A Dub, was released in Japan in August 2009. Ten of Hearts was released in 2015.

She has performed all over the world, garnering huge followings in many East African countries. She has had success collaborating with the who's who of reggae music including Shaggy, Beres Hammond, Beenie Man and many others. She co-wrote the hit songs 'Gimmie Likkle One Drop' and 'Wanty Wanty' with Tarrus Riley and wrote the hit song 'Tight Skirt' for Samantha J. She also wrote the hit song 'Automatic' for the queen of reggae music, Marcia Griffiths.

The first song she independently produced and released, 'You Are Me', was inspired by the incursion that took place in Jamaica's Tivoli Gardens. Alaine draws attention to the fact that we are all one and if we treat each other the way we treat ourselves, a lot of the world's ills could be healed.

Alaine recently released a new video for her song 'You Give Me Hope'. She is a resident judge on Jamaica's number one reality talent search show 'Digicel Rising Stars'. Her personality and energy has made her recognizable to her Jamaican fans and fans worldwide.

== Discography ==
=== Studio albums ===
Sacrifice (2007)
No.	Title	Producer(s)	Length
1.	"Rise in Love"	Arif 'Supacoop' Cooper	3:37
2.	"Sacrifice"	Donovan 'Vendetta' Bennett	3:43
3.	"Ride" (featuring Tony Matterhorn)	Donovan 'Vendetta' Bennett, Tony Matterhorn	3:03
4.	"Sincerely"	Donovan 'Vendetta' Bennett	3:49
5.	"Baby Love"	Donovan 'Vendetta' Bennett	4:16
6.	"Deeper"	Donovan 'Vendetta' Bennett	3:50
7.	"Wine"	Donovan 'Vendetta' Bennett	4:53
8.	"Make Me Weak"	Donovan 'Vendetta' Bennett	3:13
9.	"Obsessed"	Donovan 'Vendetta' Bennett	3:38
10.	"Heavenly"	Donovan 'Vendetta' Bennett	3:24
11.	"No Ordinary Love"	Donovan 'Vendetta' Bennett	4:26
12.	"Keep Lovin' You"	Donovan 'Vendetta' Bennett	3:25
13.	"Ya Ya (I Want It)"	Donovan 'Vendetta' Bennett	5:06
14.	"Give You"	Donovan 'Vendetta' Bennett	3:25
15.	"Anything"	Donovan 'Vendetta' Bennett	3:01
16.	"Earth Cry"	Donovan 'Vendetta' Bennett	3:53
17.	"Sacrifice" (TC Movements Remix) (featuring Beenie Man)	Donovan 'Vendetta' Bennett	3:52

- Release on November 27, 2007, on Don Corleon Records

Luv a Dub (2009)
No.	Title	Producer(s)	Length
1.	"Without You"	Donovan 'Vendetta' Bennett	3:27
2.	"Color Blind"	Donovan 'Vendetta' Bennett	3:22
3.	"Forever More" (featuring Tarrus Riley)	Donovan 'Vendetta' Bennett	3:55
4.	"Never Done"	Donovan 'Vendetta' Bennett	3:44
5.	"Over U"	Donovan 'Vendetta' Bennett	3:19
6.	"Love of a Lifetime"	Donovan 'Vendetta' Bennett	3:55
7.	"Flash Back to Dancehall" (featuring 8 Bars of Fame)	Donovan 'Vendetta' Bennett	3:42
8.	"Spin Me"	Donovan 'Vendetta' Bennett	3:29
9.	"Luv a Dub" (featuring Buju Banton)	Donovan 'Vendetta' Bennett, Buju Banton	3:08
10.	"No Ordinary Love" (Remix)	Donovan 'Vendetta' Bennett	4:26
11.	"Sincerely"	Donovan 'Vendetta' Bennett	3:49
12.	"Follow U"	Donovan 'Vendetta' Bennett	3:18
13.	"Shame on Both of Us"	Donovan 'Vendetta' Bennett	3:26
14.	"Mama"	Donovan 'Vendetta' Bennett	3:16
15.	"Speak Love"	Donovan 'Vendetta' Bennett	3:14

Release on August 6, 2009, on Koyashi Haikyu Records

Ten of Hearts (2015)
No.	Title	Producer(s)	Length
1.	"Ten of Hearts (Intro)"
2.	"Like a Drum (featuring Dre Island)"
3.	"Favorite Boy"	Chimney Records
4.	"Sugar Love (featuring Tarrus Riley)"
5.	"Loving Feeling"
6.	"Don´t Walk Away (featuring J Boog)"	James Brunt
7.	"Ain´t No Sunshine"
8.	"T.H.I.S."
9.	"Sidewalk Hotel"
10.	"Number One (Dexta Daps)"
11.	"Better Than This"
12.	"Suzanna"
13.	"Make It Home Again"
14.	"Wafula (featuring Mwalim Churchill)"

Release on May 26, 2015

=== Singles ===
==== Solo singles ====
- "Sacrifice"
- "Without you"
- "No Ordinary Love"
- "Forever More" (featuring Tarrus Riley)
- "Flashback to Dancehall" (featuring 8 Bars)
- "Color Blind"
- "Luv a Dub" (featuring Buju Banton))
- "Me & You (Secret)" (featuring Chino)
- "Touch (On and On)"
- "Jehovah"
- "Up"

==== Featured singles ====
- "Dreaming Of You" (Beenie Man featuring Alaine)
- "I Love Yuh" (Busy Signal featuring Alaine)
- "Dying for a Cure" (Wayne Marshall featuring Alaine)
- "HeartBeat" (Mavado featuring Alaine)
- "Tonight" (Machel Montano featuring Alaine)
- "Love Sound" (Beres Hammond featuring Alaine)
- "For Your Eyes Only" (Shaggy featuring Alaine)
- "Ride" (Tony Matterhorn featuring Alaine)
- "Nakupenda Pia (I LOVE YOU TOO)" (Kevin Wyre featuring Alaine)
- "Wafula" (Alaine featuring Churchill)
- "I DO" (Willy Paul featuring Alaine)/
