= Tedd Josiah =

Kenyan music producer and entrepreneur

Edmond "Tedd" Josiah (born 1970) is a Kenyan music producer and entrepreneur.

== Early life ==
Josiah was raised by his grandmother in Nakuru in Kenya, before moving to the USA during his early childhood to live with his father in Chicago. He credits routine visits to a record store with his father with developing his interest in music.

He moved back to Kenya in 1981.

== Music career ==
Josiah is a self-taught producer.

He started his career in gospel music as a musician, first briefly with the group Ebony Affair before forming a new group, Hart, in 1993. Hart was disbanded in 1995 and Josiah joined Sync Sound Studios as a producer. In 1999, he left Sync Sound Studios and formed Audio Vault Studios. It was renamed to Blu Zebra in 2002.

He is credited for producing compilation albums called 'Kenyan, The First Chapter' and 'Kenyan, The Second Chapter'. The two albums featured Hardstone, Kalamashaka, Gidi Gidi Maji Maji, Necessary Noize, In-Tu, Jimmy Gathu, Maina Kageni, Pete Odera, Ndarling P and Ugandan musician Kawesa.

Tedd Josiah has worked with many of the most popular Kenyan performers like Poxi Presha, Suzzana Owiyo, Achieng' Abura, Abbi, and Didge among others.

Tedd Josiah has most recently produced for up and coming new artists such as Iddi Hemed, with the hit song Usijali and Pace Kenya with his song "Napata".

For the 2007 General elections, Josiah campaigned for ODM and its presidential candidate Raila Odinga. During the post-election crisis Josiah felt his life threatened and moved to London in 2008.

Josiah is also the founder of Kisima Awards, the premier annual musical awards held in Kenya. He was the given producer of the Year prize at the Kisima Awards in 2004, but he rejected it citing his position as an organiser of the awards. The win caused controversy, and Josiah resigned as the Awards' CEO the following year.

He returned to Kenya in 2015. Upon his return, he launched a record label, SwaRnB, but it was not successful. Following this, Josiah quit music to focus on his leather goods start-up JokaJok.

== JokaJok ==
Josiah started the luxury bag brand JokaJok to honor his late wife Regina Katar, who had introduced him to the fashion world. The brand's workshop is located in his Nairobi home and employs 7 artisans.

== Personal life ==
Josiah married his first wife Cynthia Akoth in 2002; they had two children and divorced in 2008.

He and his second wife Regina Katar met in 2016 after he returned to Kenya from the United Kingdom. They have one daughter together, Jameela Wendo. Katar died abruptly on 30 September 2017, three months after Jameela's birth, due to low patent count as a result of child birth.
