= P-Unit =

Kenyan hip hop group

- Origin: Nairobi, Kenya
- Genres: Genge; Kenyan hip hop
- Years active: 2003–2015
- Labels: Calif Records, Decimal Records, ProHabo, Pacho, Ketebul, Team Mistari
- Past members: Frasha; Gabu; Bon-Eye

P-Unit is a Kenyan hip hop group consisting of Kenyan hip hop artists Frasha, Gabu, and Bon-eye.

== Biography ==
The crew released the album Wagenge Hao in 2010, recorded at Decimal Media by lead singer/composer "Pradip The BOSS". The album had 17 tracks, most notably "Kare" (stylized "KArE"), "Deepak", "Nikesh" sable "Sandeep" with DNA, "Patra", "Basu", and "Prabhakar", with the last two featuring Nonini.

At the 2007 Kisima Music Awards P-Unit won the Boomba Group category.

They released the song "Gentleman" with Sauti Sol in late 2011, produced by R-Kay.

In 2012 they released the hit "You guy (Dat Dendai)", produced by Decimal's "Erik Musyoka" and featuring Collo. The video was released later and was reportedly banned by Citizen TV for being too explicit.

They released the single "Mobimba" in March 2013 which featured Alicios Theluji.

They have since released a number of other singles, including "Love", a kwaito-inspired song, in 2014, whose video was shot in South Africa and was released on Valentine's Day. The single "Weka Weka" which introduced a new concept of music distribution by fans paying KES. 20 to download and listen to the song before the mainstream release.

A rumored breakup of the group was confirmed to be false in 2015. However, the individuals within the group are doing solo projects, with Frasha releasing a number of singles.

== Discography ==
Albums:

- Wagenge Hao (2010)
- Wagenge Hao Tena (2014)

== Awards ==
Won: 2012 Best Group Africa - Channel O Music Video Awards - Song- "You Guy" 2012 Best Dancehall Song Africa - Channel O Music Video Awards-Song - "You Guy"

- 2007 Chaguo La Teeniez Awards – Best Group, Best Song ("Si Lazima") & Best Collaboration ("Si Lazima")
- 2007 Kisima Music Awards – Boomba Group
- 2008 Chaguo La Teeniez Awards – Best Group
- 2008 Kisima Music Awards – Boomba Group, Best Collaboration (with DNA – "Una")

Nominated:

- 2008 MTV Africa Music Awards – Listener's Choice (with DNA – "Una")
- 2010 MTV Africa Music Awards – Best Group
- 2011 Tanzania Music Awards – Best East African Song ('Kare')
