= African popular music =

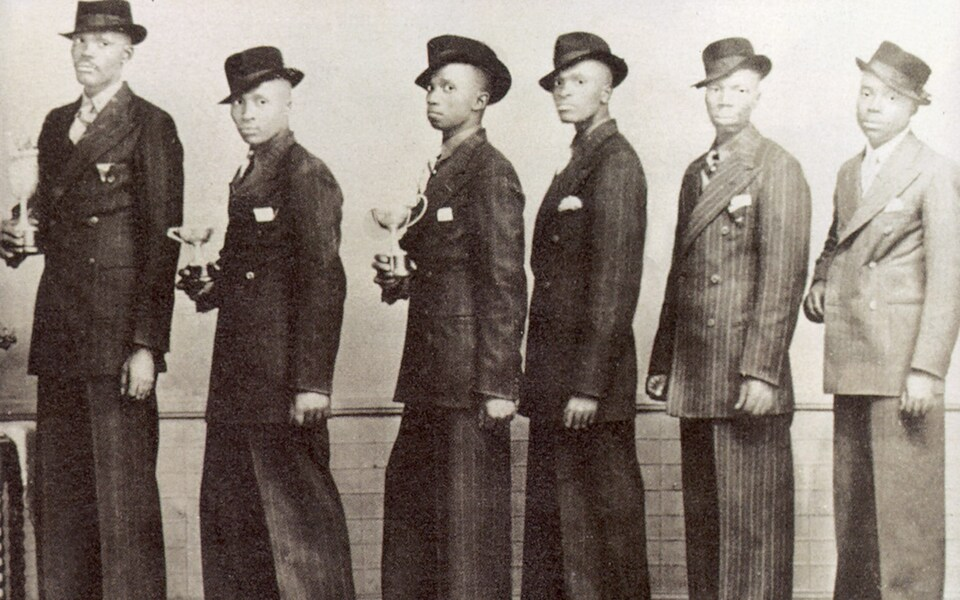
South African isicathamiya, choral vocal group Solomon Linda's Original Evening Birds pictured in 1941- most famed for their song "Mbube", the origin of the song "The Lion Sleeps Tonight".

African popular music (also styled Afropop, Afro-pop, Afro pop or African pop) can be defined as any African music, regardless of genre, that uses Western pop musical instruments, such as the guitar, piano, trumpet, etc. Afropop is a genre of music that combines elements from both African traditional music with Western pop music, characterized by the use of African rhythms and melodies, as well as western instrumentation and production techniques. Like African traditional music, Afropop is vast and varied. Most contemporary genres of western popular music build on cross-pollination with traditional African American and African popular music. Many genres in popular music of rock, metal, pop, blues, jazz, salsa, zouk, and rumba derive, of varying degrees, musical traditions from Africa cultured to the Americas, by enslaved Africans. These rhythms and sounds have subsequently been adapted by newer genres like hip-hop, and R&B. Likewise, African popular music have adopted Western music industry recording studio techniques. The term does not refer to a specific style or sound but is used as a general term for African popular music.

== Influence of Afro-Cuban music ==
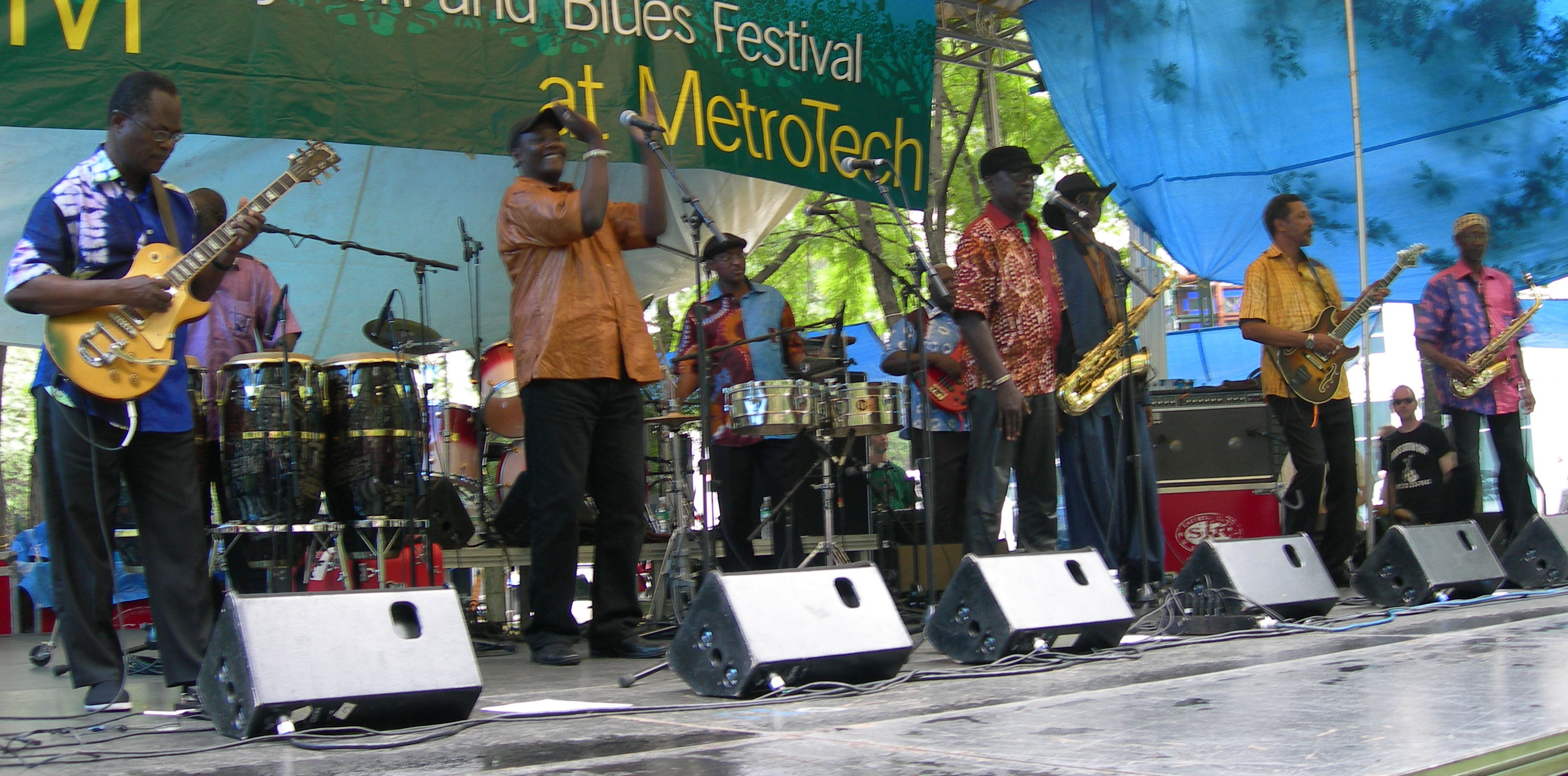
Orchestra Baobab

Cuban music has been popular in Sub-Saharan Africa since the mid-twentieth century. It was Cuban music, more than any other, that provided the initial template for Afropop. To the Africans, clave-based Cuban popular music sounded both familiar and exotic. The Encyclopedia of Africa v. 1. states:

"Beginning in the 1940s, Afro-Cuban [son] groups such as Septeto Habanero and Trio Matamoros gained widespread popularity in the Congo region as a result of airplay over Radio Congo Belge, a powerful radio station based in Léopoldville (now Kinshasa DRC). A proliferation of music clubs, recording studios, and concert appearances of Cuban bands in Léopoldville spurred on the Cuban music trend during the late 1940s and 1950s."

Congolese bands started doing Cuban covers and singing the lyrics phonetically. Soon, they were creating their own original Cuban-like compositions, with French lyrics. The Congolese called this new music rumba, although it was really based on the son. The Africans adapted guajeos to electric guitars, and gave them their own regional flavor. The guitar-based music gradually spread out from the Congo, increasingly taking on local sensibilities. This process eventually resulted in the establishment of several different distinct regional genres, such as soukous.

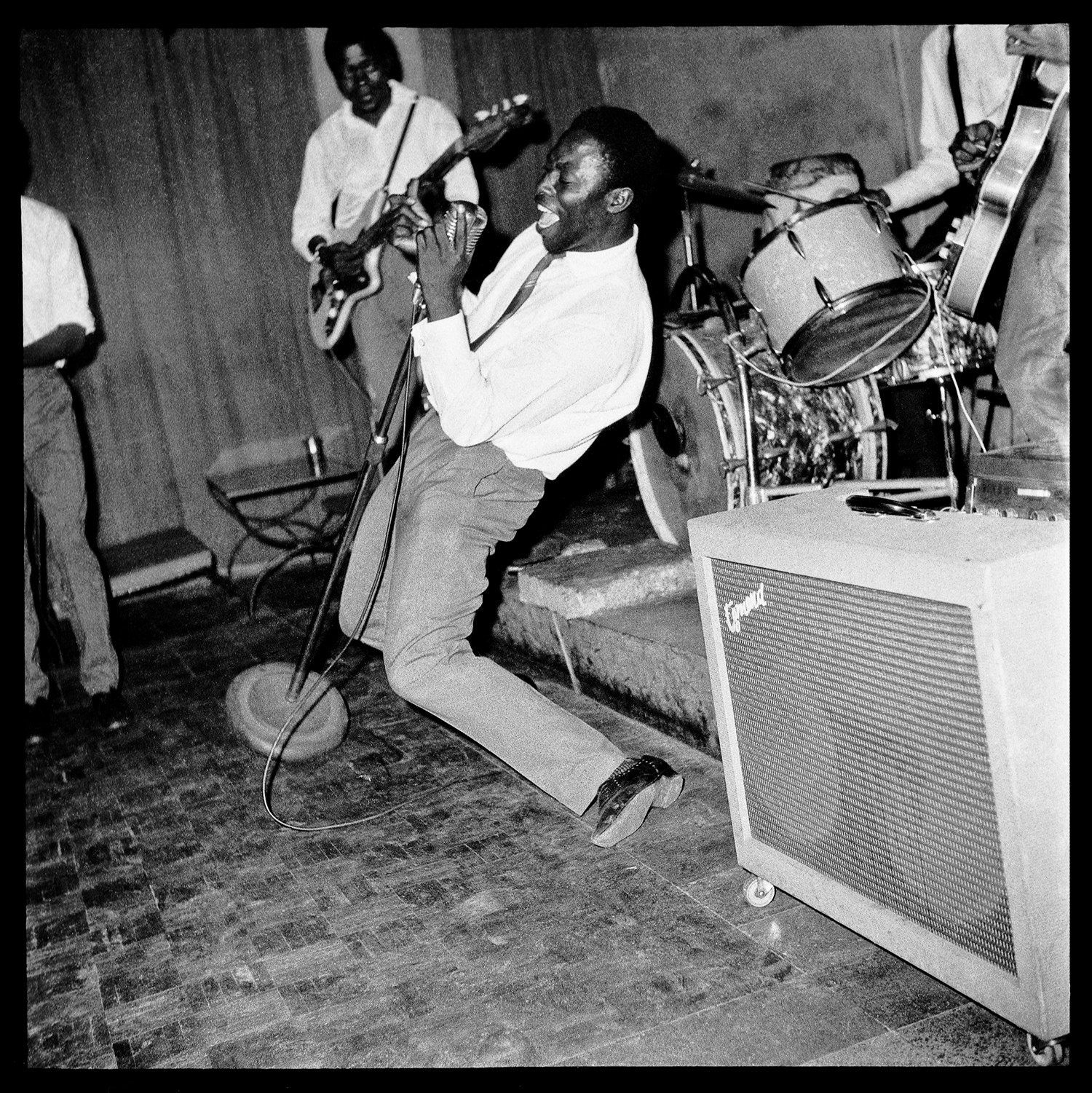
A Congolese rumba group performing in Léopoldville

Cuban popular music played a major role in the development of many contemporary genres of African popular music. John Storm Roberts states: "It was the Cuban connection, but increasingly also New York salsa, that provided the major and enduring influences—the ones that went deeper than earlier imitation or passing fashion. The Cuban connection began very early and was to last at least twenty years, being gradually absorbed and re-Africanized." The re-working of Afro-Cuban rhythmic patterns by Africans brings the rhythms full circle.

The re-working of the harmonic patterns reveals a striking difference in perception. The I, IV, V, IV, harmonic progression, commonly used in Cuban music, is heard in pop music all across the African continent, thanks to the influence of Cuban music. Those chords move in accordance with the basic tenets of Western music theory. However, as Gerhard Kubik points out, performers of African popular music do not necessarily perceive these progressions in the same way: "The harmonic cycle of C-F-G-F [I-IV-V-IV] prominent in Congo/Zaire popular music simply cannot be defined as a progression from tonic to subdominant to dominant and back to subdominant (on which it ends) because in the performer's appreciation they are of equal status, and not in any hierarchical order as in Western music."

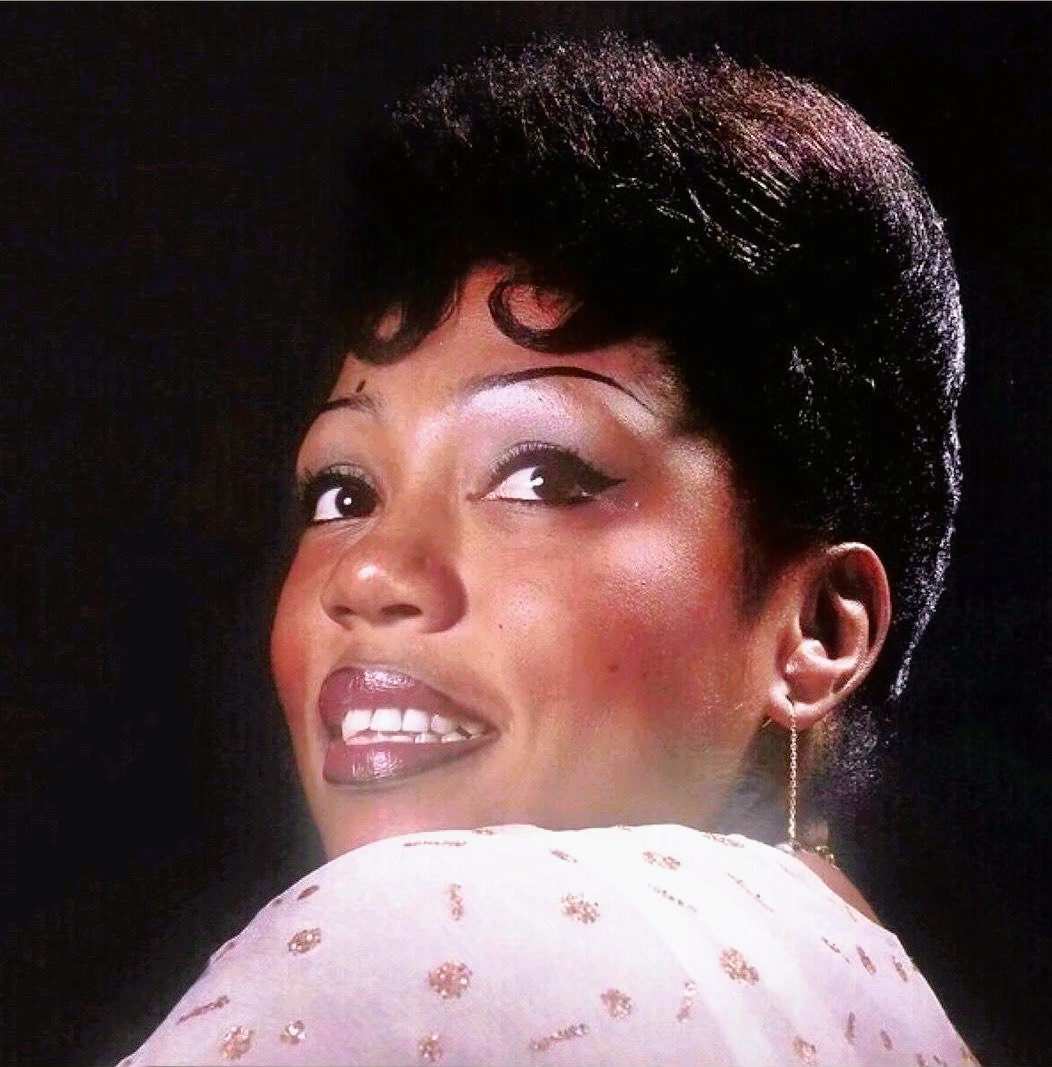
Abeti Masikini is one of the African female artists who revolutionized African music with her unique blend of rhythms.

The largest wave of Cuban-based music to hit Africa was in the form of salsa. In 1974 the Fania All Stars performed in Zaire (known today as the Democratic Republic of the Congo), Africa, at the 80,000-seat Stadu du Hai in Kinshasa. This was captured on film and released as Live In Africa (Salsa Madness in the UK). The Zairean appearance occurred at a music festival held in conjunction with the Muhammad Ali/George Foreman heavyweight title fight. Local genres were already well established by this time. Even so, salsa caught on in many African countries, especially in the Senegambia and Mali. Cuban music had been the favorite of Senegal's nightspot in the 1950s to 1960s. The Senegalese band Orchestra Baobab plays in a basic salsa style with congas and timbales, but with the addition of Wolof and Mandinka instruments and lyrics.

According to Lise Waxer: "African salsa points not so much to a return of salsa to African soil (Steward 1999: 157) but to a complex process of cultural appropriation between two regions of the so-called Third World." Since the mid-1990s African artists have also been very active through the super-group Africando, where African and New York musicians mix with leading African singers such as Bambino Diabate, Ricardo Lemvo, Ismael Lo and Salif Keita. It is still common today for an African artist to record a salsa tune, and add their own particular regional touch to it.

== Afropop's global influence ==
=== The African diaspora ===
African popular music spans beyond borders and traditional African music, and it has been shaping music around the world for centuries. This influence began with the dispersion of millions of Africans around the world during the slave trade and continues today as people travel to and from Africa.

The connection between Africa and the wider diaspora was reinforced as African artists toured around the world. In the period of the late 60s to early 70s, there was a number of visits from artists such as "James Brown, who toured Nigeria in 1968, and the legendary Soul-to-Soul concert held in Accra in 1971—which saw musical powerhouses in Wilson Pickett, Ike and Tina Turner, and Roberta Flack." In the late 90s to the early 2000s the Black African population within England and Wales grew higher than their Caribbean counterparts for the first time. This growing population would soon plant the seeds for an influential rave scene at key universities throughout the UK.

=== African rhythms and melodies ===
African popular music has contributed distinct rhythms, melodies, and vocal styles that have deeply influenced various global genres. Many global styles incorporate African call-and-response patterns, improvisation, and polyrhythms. "Jazz music, blues music, and gospel music all grew from African roots. Spirituals, work calls, and chants coupled with makeshift instruments morphed into blues rhythms and ragtime. Ragtime paved the way for jazz, and elements from all these styles influenced rock and roll and hip hop music." The percussion elements of Nigerian jùjú and the grooves of Congolese ndombolo can be recognized in electronic and pop music across the world.

=== Rise of global festivals ===
Major music festivals, such as Coachella, Glastonbury, and Afropunk, increasingly feature African artists, bringing African music to new audiences worldwide. Music festivals have grown into a global phenomenon, and they have become "international celebrations of culture, art, and, of course, music," serving as platforms for African artists to showcase their talents and reach a global audience.

Musical festivals have featured many African artists like Wizkid, Burna Boy, Mr. Eazi, Rema, and Asake. Femi Kuti was also able to perform at Glastonbury, expanding the reach of Afrobeats. Participation in international music festivals has increased the global recognition of Afropop music, establishing a mainstream appeal in Western markets and allowing artists to network globally. This exposure to international audiences has led to global fanbases and diverse listeners, working to expand Afropop's influence across the world.

=== Afrobeats beyond Africa ===
Fela Kuti's Afrobeats has had a particularly significant impact on music worldwide. Fela Kuti has been credited with the early development of Afrobeats. Kuti blended "traditional Yoruba music with Western jazz and funk to create a unique and rich sound" that would become to be known as Afrobeats. Kuti's 1977 album, Zombie, was a major break for Afrobeats on a global scale. Afrobeats soon began to gain international recognition, and in the mid-2010s, artists such as Wizkid, Davido, and Burna Boy began to collaborate with global artists, propelling Afrobeats into the global mainstream. Now, major international artists, such as "Beyoncé, Ed Sheeran, and Major Lazer have collaborated with Afrobeats stars, blending their sounds to create hit songs that resonate with global audiences."

=== The role of technology ===
Afropop's influence across the globe has been amplified by social media, streaming services, and digital music platforms, such as YouTube, Spotify, and TikTok, making it easier for fans around the world to access and discover Afropop.

Davin Phillips, the executive director at Celebrity Services Africa (CSA), believes that social media has amplified the reach of African artists, saying, "I think social media, maybe more technology, has allowed us to actually go into other regions across the continent that previously didn’t have access to certain streaming or publishing. We’ve been able to identify the continent a lot more and bring it together. Also, another thing, as we know, in any emerging market, sometimes we only give our own artists the recognition, but we are seeing the international community recognize them."

Data shows that TikTok has over 1.677 billion users globally, and South Africa makes up about 11.83 million of those users. Similarly, Instagram's data also shows that, out of its 2.35 billion users, 14.9 million of those users are from West Africa. Phillips finishes, "This has allowed young artists like eSwatini-born DJ, Uncle Waffles, Nigeria’s Rema, and even South Africa’s Musa Keys to take the world by storm in what feels like the blink of an eye."

== Genres ==
Genres of African popular music include:

- African heavy metal
- African hip hop
- African trap music (aka ATM)
- Afro house
- Afro fusion
- Afrobeat
- Afro house
- Afro jazz
- Alté
- Afrobeats
- Afro tech
- Afro trap
- Afro rave
- Afro rock
- Afro-soul
- Amapiano
- Apala
- Azonto
- Balwo
- Batuque
- Benga
- Bikutsi
- Jazz
- Bongo Flava
- Boomba (aka Kapuka)
- Cape Jazz
- Chimurenga
- Coladeira
- Congolese rumba
- Coupé-Décalé
- Ethio-jazz
- Fuji music
- Funaná
- Gnawa music
- Genge
- Gengeton
- Gqom
- Highlife
- Hipco
- Hiplife
- Igbo highlife
- Igwijo
- Isicathamiya
- Jit
- Jùjú
- Kalindula
- Kilalaky
- Kizomba
- Kuduro
- Kwaito
- Kwela
- Makossa
- Malipenga
- Maloya
- Marrabenta
- Mbalax
- Mbaqanga
- Mbube
- Morna
- Motswako
- Museve
- Pandza
- Sudanese popular music
- Ndombolo
- Ogene
- Palm-wine (aka Maringa)
- Raï
- Sakara
- Salegy
- Sega
- Semba
- Shangaan electro
- Soukous (aka Congo, Lingala or African rumba)
- Street pop
- Sungura
- Taarab
- Tsapiky
- Wassoulou music
- Zimbabwean jazz
- Zouglou
- Zouk

== See also ==
- African traditional music
- African-American popular music
- Mory Kanté
- Music of the African diaspora
- List of musical genres of the African diaspora
