= Harry Kimani =

Kenyan musician and composer (born 1982)

Harrison Mūngai "Harry" Kìmani (born c. 1982) is a Kenyan musician and composer.

== Biography ==
Kìmani grew up with music, teaching himself to play the guitar by watching an older brother perform. He attended Kirangari High School in Nairobi, where he already showed a great interest in music; he sang, composed songs, participated in music festivals and, at one time, conducted the school choir. His first love in high school inspired him to compose a song called "African Woman," which was well received among his friends; they urged him to record the song.

In 1999, Kìmani left school to look for a recording studio. Eventually, in 2000, he met producer Maurice Oyando of Next Level Productions; with Oyando's assistance, he recorded "African Woman," which was released as a single. The song began to receive air play on several radio stations in Nairobi. Encouraged by this early success, Kìmani returned to the studio to record a complete album, tentatively titled African Woman. A second single, "Tuohere" (God Forgive Us), was released for radio play. Although the African Woman album was completed in 2001, it was not released due to lack of funds. Undaunted, Kìmani returned to the studio to work on another album while his first one waited for release. He has since recorded and released two albums, Unborn and Tiushi Mi Nawe.

When the Festival Mundial officials visited Kenya in September 2002, they were impressed by Kìmani's talents. He performed at the 2003 Sarakasi Festival in Nairobi and was part of a group of Kenyan artists invited to perform at the Festival Mundial in June 2003 in the Netherlands.

Harry Kìmani was also featured in the award-winning African hip-hop documentary Hip-hop Colony.

In 2009, Harry released his latest album, The Quest.

== Style ==
Kìmani's musical style has been described as "African soul and a little bit of rumba and R&B." He sings in three languages—English, Kikuyu and Swahili—and his lyrics address the issues of everyday life and society. His recent performances have included the North Sea Jazz Festival in Rotterdam, North Sea Jazz Salutes Nairobi, and Bløf's Umoja Project launch in Amsterdam.

== Discography ==
- The Quest – 2009
- Tuishi Mi Nawe – Sawa Sawa Fair Trade Label 2006
- Unborn – 2005 (collaborative effort with Bamboo, Attitude, Mercy Myra and more)
- African Woman – 2001 (unreleased)

== Awards ==
Won:

- 2005 Kisima Music Awards for Best Music Video & Best Song

Nominated:

- 2005 Kora Awards – Most Promising Male Artiste
