= Jua Cali =

Kenyan genge artist (born 1979)

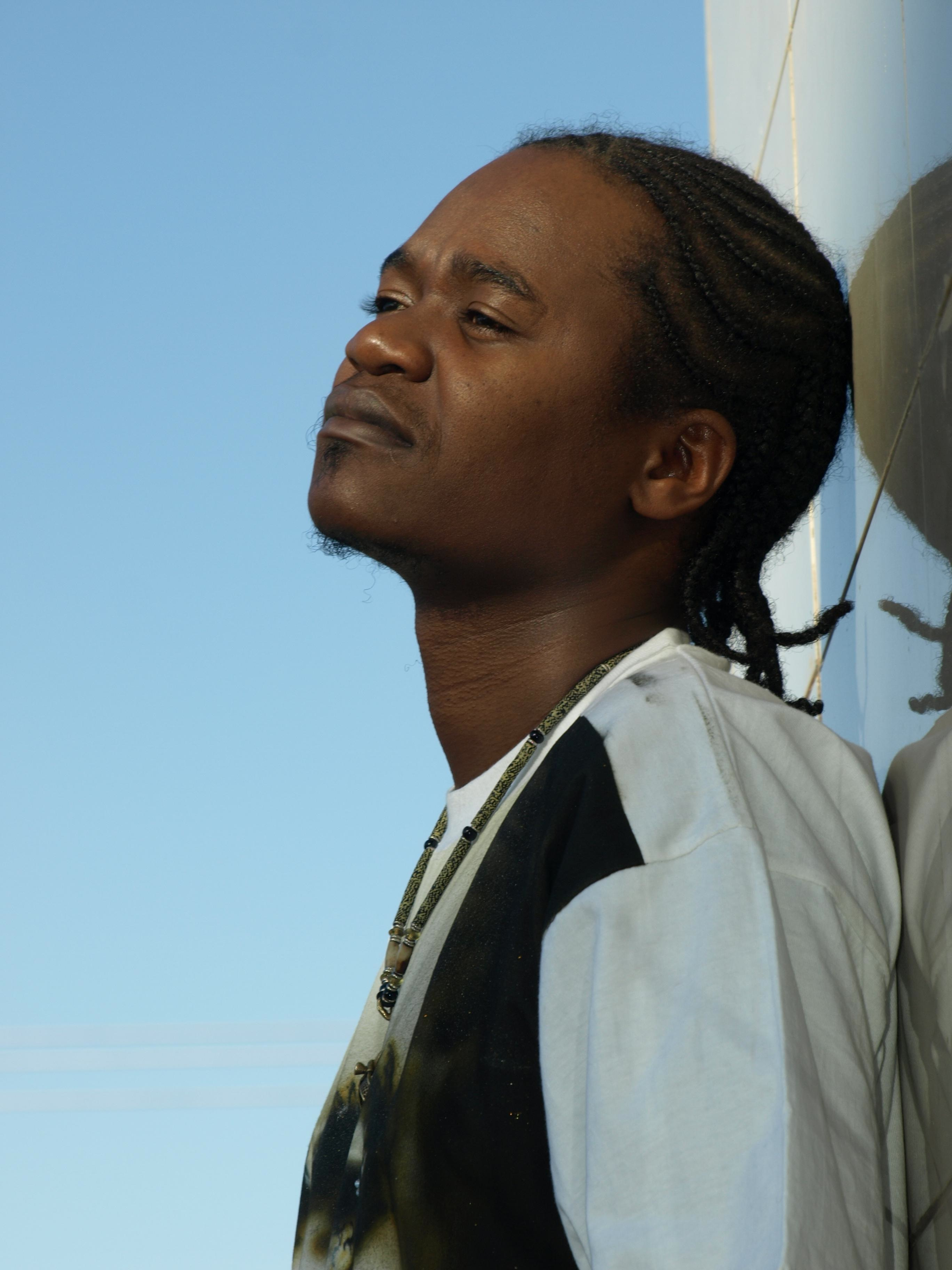
- Jua Cali during a photo shoot for his album, Ngeli ya Genge in 2009

Background information
- Born: Paul Julius Nunda; 12 September 1979 (age 46); Nairobi, Kenya
- Genres: Genge; hip hop
- Occupations: Rapper; record producer; singer; songwriter
- Instruments: Vocals; keyboard; sampler
- Years active: 1998–present
- Label: Calif

Paul Julius Nunda (born 12 September 1979), better known by his stage name Jua Cali, is a Kenyan rapper and record producer. In 2000, together with record producer Clemo, he founded Calif Records where he has been ever since, producing local and international music which has dominated East African music alongside Jose Chameleone of Uganda and Mr. Nice of Tanzania. Jua Cali performs in Swahili and Sheng in a popular Kenyan style of rapping called genge.

== Early life ==
Jua Cali was born in Eastlands, Nairobi. His parents, Doreen Onditi and Evans Onditi (deceased) were both schoolteachers. He grew up with a strict Catholic upbringing in California Estate to the east of Nairobi city. He began rapping at age 10, encouraged by his elder brother Christopher Sati. He was known as an introverted teenager who was often quiet, hardly ever socialising.

He attended Ainsworth Primary School (Standards 1 to 6); Shepherds Junior Buruburu (Standards 6 to 8); Jamuhuri High School and eventually Kenya Christian Industrial Training Institute (K.C.I.T.I) Eastleigh where he received a diploma in Information technology. There, he played basketball with ambitions to make it to the Kenyan National Basketball Team. He never made it to the team, blaming this on his height. His earlier foray into music included singing in a band called 'Sita Futi'. Sita Futi disbanded almost as soon as it was started leaving behind Jua Cali and his close friend Jemmoh. The departing group members left to pursue careers outside music. Calif Records came into being after Jua Cali teamed up with childhood friend Clemo to form the record label that quickly became a hit factory, gaining prominence in the East Africa music scene with chart topping artists and music. Calif Records also invented the Genge genre of Kenyan hip hop. Jua Cali often cites his brother, Chris, and his parents as his greatest influences in life. He is also related to dell xerxes as his brother in law.

== Music career ==
His first recorded track was Ruka, released in 2001, and was followed by Nipe Asali in 2002. In 2004 he collaborated with Pilipili in track "Kamata Dame". Like most Kenyan artists, it took several years before his first full album was released. His album "Juacali Sekta" reached the stores in 2006, containing mostly previously released singles.

His single Kwaheri (featuring Sainapei Tande-winner Coca-Cola pop star and radio presenter) was a major hit in Kenya in 2007. At the New Year's Eve 2008/2009 he released a new album, Ngeli ya Genge. He has toured the US and other countries. In August 2007, he was among 100 most influential Kenyans as selected by The Standard newspaper.

His stage name Jua Cali, is derived from California, an estate in Nairobi (as is the name of Calif Records). 'Jua' is Swahili for 'Know'. This translates his name to 'Know California'. It also resembles Jua Kali, a Swahili term meaning fierce sun, which has been taken to refer to Kenya's informal sector of the economy.

He has released a series of new songs with a new producer Keggah based in the United States. His new songs include, Karibu Nairobi and Kuna Sheng which have both received massive airplay and good reviews.

== Endorsements ==
=== Motorola ===
He became Kenya's first artist to get an endorsement deal when in 2007 he signed a reported 1-million-a-year deal mobile phone giant Motorola for its W model. "Jua Cali is part of the Motorola family, and we are honoured to have worked with him in the recent past," says Joanne Doyle, the marketing manager for Motorola East Africa. "He has been a great ambassador and, like Motorola, he is all about creativity, style and substance, so we could not be happier that his hard work has been recognised at the prestigious Kisima awards."

=== Orange Mobile ===
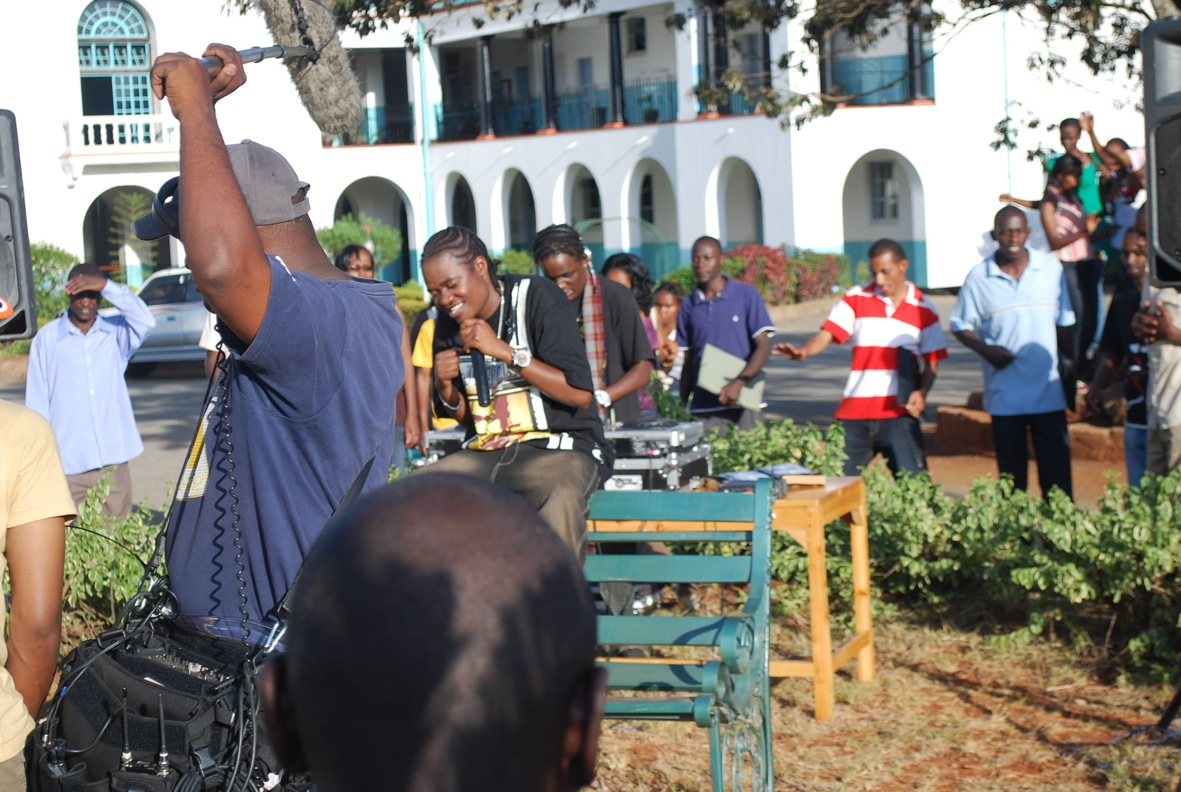
Juacali shooting the Hello tunes commercial at Nairobi Primary

Juacali is arguably today's most successful artist in the Kenyan music scene as far as endorsements and pay per show income is concerned. Early 2009, Telkom Kenya appointed him as the Orange Ambassador for their youth market and began his one-year sh10-million shilling contract by fronting the 'hello tunes' advertising campaign. Following the successes by the Kenyan Rugby Sevens team, Orange went on to shoot a series of infomercials on Rugby featuring top Kenya rugby players and the genge artist. Also featured in the informercials were label mates Mejja, Jimwat and their producer Clemo.

=== Pamoja Mtaani ===
Pamoja Mtaani, Swahili for "together in the hood" is a new video game in Kenya developed by Warner Bros. Interactive Entertainment. Its basically about a youth band together making their way through a maze of challenges throughout the East African city. The game has a subtle but deliberate agenda: HIV prevention. Players do not directly confront the threat of HIV; instead, they encounter challenges throughout the adventure that lead to lessons about risk and self-confidence. Jua Cali recorded the video games anthem "City in the Sun".

=== Others ===
The artiste has also been involved in other major advertisements such as Protex bath soap and Pilsner beer, and the deals have raked in big cash. He's also the Bloodlink Foundation Kenya ambassador. Bloodlink Foundation Kenya is a non-profit charitable trust established in Kenya seeking to assist Kenyan people achieve better health and improved quality of life through partnership with communities, corporate organisations and public sectors.

== Discography ==
Albums:

- JuacaliSekta (October 2006)
- Ngeli ya Genge (December 2008)
- TuGenge Yajayo(December 2013)
- Mali Ya Umma (September 2019)

== Awards ==
Won

- 2006 Kisima Music Awards – Boomba Male
- 2007 Chaguo La Teeniez Awards (CHAT Awards) – Best Male & Celebrity of the Year
- 2007 Kisima Music Awards – Best Male Artist & Boomba Male.
- 2007 Pearl of Africa Music Awards (PAM Awards) – Best Male Artist (Kenya)
- 2008 Chaguo La Teeniez Awards – Favourite Male Artiste & Best Live Stage Performance & Best Collabo Song ("Kwaheri" with Sainapei).
- 2025 creative forces behind Calif Records and the Genge music movement that defined a generation. https://www.kbc.co.ke/mashujaa-day-honours-jua-cali-clemmo-ted-josiah-kbcs-elizabeth-obege/

Nominated

- 2006 Chaguo La Teeniez Awards – nominated in three categories, but won none of them
- 2007 MTV Europe Music Awards – Best Africa Act
- 2007 MOBO Awards
- 2008 Tanzania Music Awards – Best East African Song ("Kwaheri")
- 2008 MTV Africa Music Awards – Best Male
