= Peter Kaberere =

Kenyan singer

Peter Kaberere (died 6 April 2014) was a Kenyan singer mostly in Swahili Pop and Zouk and contemporary gospel music. Kaberere also known as Qabbz after his surname began career with the music group Jogg C which had Lena Ochieng and Nuvine as members and merged with Gospel Fathers to form Zaidi Ya Mziki. He later launched a solo musical career. He released the album Kiburi that produced the hit "Kiburi Famous hits include "Nisamehe" and has collaborated with Mr Vee in the song "Just a Way". He also featured in "Mwanake" by Benachi. Kaberere and worked as Logistics/Operations Manager at Mo Sound Events, the company that hosts the Annual Gospel Awards Groove Awards and the Safaricom Live concerts.

He was electrocuted at his own car wash. He was married to Njesh Wa Qabbz and had a son and was expecting his second child, a daughter born just hours after his burial at the Langata cemetery.
