= Daddy Owen =

Kenyan singer (born 1982)

- Also known as: Papa Fololo
- Born: Owen Mwatia; January 29, 1982 (age 44); Kakamega
- Origin: Kakamega
- Genres: Gospel Kapungala
- Occupations: Songwriter, gospel singer, graphic designer
- Years active: 2003–present
- Labels: Beats and blessings
- Website: www.daddyowen.com

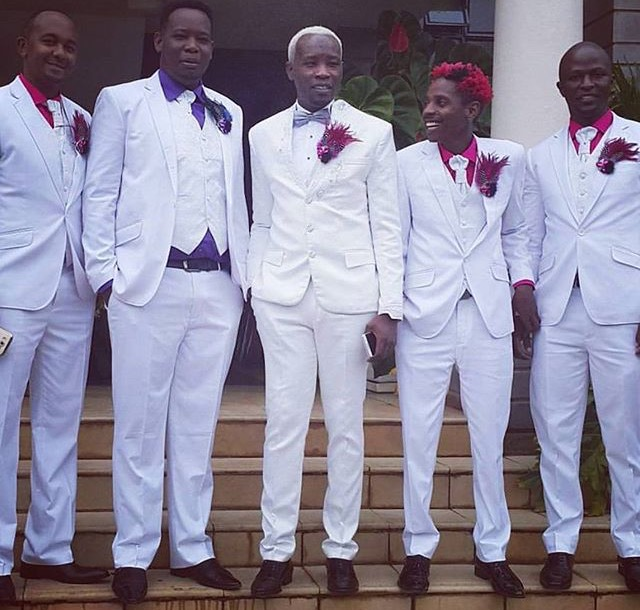
Daddy Owen with friends on his wedding day.

Owen Mwatia (born January 1, 1982), popularly known as Daddy Owen, is a Kenyan contemporary Christian music (CCM) artist and songwriter from Kakamega, Kenya. Owen is the brother to Kenyan Award-winning gospel musician Rufftone. He is a member of the Kenya Assemblies of God Church, Buru Buru, Nairobi and is signed to Beats & Blessings family. Daddy Owen was married to Farida Wambui (2 April 2016) and has since separated in 2021.

== Early life ==
Daddy Owen was born in Kakamega, Western Kenya, in 1982. He is the second born in a family of four brothers, all musicians and a sister. His elder brother Rufftone is a gospel musician who Daddy Owen refers to as "my inspiration". He is an alumnus of Eshihiru Secondary school but was not lucky enough to join a tertiary institution due to financial constraints. He thus had to travel to Nairobi where he worked as a matatu tout. The income he earned from this job was to meagre that it could not sustain his needs and that of his family. Daddy Owen has always confessed that he used to be a pick pocket in Downtown Nairobi and thus was until he was attacked by a mob and almost lynched.

"It all happened in a split second. All I remember was lying down surrounded by a huge crowd who beat me up mercilessly. One poked my eye using a sharp instrument. Meanwhile, I could hear the rest urging someone to bring a car tyre to burn me alive.”

After spending a whole week in an eye hospital in Kikuyu, he decided to turn over a new leaf. He however remains with a scar on his left eye that he conceals with his pair of sunglasses

== Career ==
Owen started singing way back when he was still in high school but was not particularly able to hit the limelight because he lacked money to record his songs as he was from a humble background. He however credits his breakthrough to great support both financial, spiritual and emotional from his family, particularly his brother Rufftone and the late gospel artist Kaberere who he has constantly called his mentor.

Daddy Owen released his first album, Haijalishi, in 2004. Some of his most well-known songs are "Mbona" which was co-authored by Denno, "Foundation", "Tobina", "Kazi ya Msalaba", "Saluti", and "System ya Kapungala". He is currently a praise and worship member at the Kenya Assemblies of God, Nairobi. Daddy Owen has Four albums to his name: Saluti, System ya Kapungala, Son of Man and Haijaisha. He was the Groove Awards male artist of the year from the year 2009 to 2011. His song 'Saluti' earned three groove award nominations and went on win in all three categories. Mwatia popularizes in Lingala music.

He is the founder member of Malaika Awards, a Charitable organization for the disabled.

== Philanthropy ==
Daddy Owen is the founder of Malaika Awards which seeks to honour artistes with disabilities. He also launched the "Macho Macho" campaign (see Fred Hollows Foundation and Macho Macho campaign) aimed at providing medical attention to needy people with eye problems in Kakamega. The Second Chance Campaign launched by Daddy Owen in 2012 gives moral and financial support to cancer victims in all parts of the country and creates cervical cancer awareness, encourages women to seek cervical cancer screening services. Daddy Owen also supports the Phoenix football team in Nairobi.

== Awards ==
He won the Anglophone' award during the MTV Africa Music Awards (MAMA).

Artist of the year at the 2012 Kisima Awards ceremony.

== Discography ==
- Haijalishi (2003)
- Son of man (2006)
- Kapungala (2008)
- Vanity (2016)
