= 2007 Kisima Music Awards =

Kenyan music awards

The 2007 Kisima Music Awards recognised and rewarded music talent in East Africa. The Kenyan based Kisima Music Awards were held on 8 September 2007 at Marula Manor in Karen, Kenya.

The award ceremony was marked with some drama. It started three hours late, at 10:00pm. Some attendees did not realize it was a black-tie event this year and attended in jeans and T-shirts. In one instance of the crowd's disagreement, Afro-fusion musician Eric Wainaina said he was "shocked" to win in the best video category. The video for his Twende Twende album was not yet officially released. He opted to give the award to Nyota Ndogo amid boos from the crowd. The Kisima nomination process has artists or production houses submit entries which are then placed into categories by the screening panel.

== Winners ==
Category	Winner (Artist - Track)
Afro Fusion	Eric Wainaina - KAMARE
Boomba Male	Jua Cali - Bidii Yangu
Boomba Female	Amani - Missing My Baby
Boomba Group	Nonini & P-Unit - Si Lazima
Contemporary Gospel	Astar - Close Your eyes
Eastern Benga	John De'Mathew - Kiuria Kinene
Gospel Ensembles	Jemima Thiongo – Imani
Hip hop	Wakamba Wawili - Musiq ya Soul
R&B	Nikki - Niwe Wako
Ragga	Wyre - She say Dat
Reggae	Ras Luigi - My!
Traditional	Tony Nyadundo - Obama
Western Benga	Jamnazi - Riziki
Best Producer	Robert Kamanzi (R Kay)
Best Song from Uganda	Chameleone ft. Professor Jay - Sivyo Ndiviyo
Best Music Video from Uganda	Obsessions - Jangu
Best Song from Tanzania	Matonya - Vailet
Best Video from Tanzania	A.Y. - Usijaribu
Best Collaboration	Artiste.ke - Tatizo
Best Music Video from Kenya	Eric Wainaina - Twende Twende
Best Song from Kenya	Eric Wainaina - Twende Twende
Most Promising Artist	Karma
Best Male Artist from Kenya	Jua Cali
Best Female Artist from Kenya	Jemima Thiongo
Best Group from Kenya	Wenyeji
Social Responsibility	Gidigidi Ft. Shaky, Fundi Frank & Die Hard - Wanaume Ibilisi
Lifetime Achievement Award	James Onyango Joel
