= Nonini =

Kenyan musician (born 1982)

- Also known as: Nonini
- Born: Hubert Mbuku Nakitare; 2 October 1982 (age 43); Nairobi, Kenya
- Genres: Genge; Kenyan hip hop
- Occupations: Rapper; singer; radio personality
- Instrument: Vocals
- Years active: 2002–present
- Label: Prohabo Entertainment

Hubert Mbuku Nakitare (born 2 October 1982), popularly known by his stage name Nonini, is a Kenyan rapper and a former radio presenter. He is often referred to as the "Godfather of Genge" due to his pioneering contributions to the music genre.

== Education ==
Hubert Nakitare, alias Nonini, attended Kawethei Secondary School in Machakos County.

== Personal life ==
Nonini (Hubert Nakitare) was born in October 1982 in California Estate in the Kamukunji constituency of Nairobi, Kenya. He is of Luhya descent. In late 2012, Nonini became a father to a baby boy.

== Biography ==
Nonini was originally signed to Calif Records but later joined Homeboyz Productions. He was introduced to the Kenyan urban music scene through his debut single "Nonini ni Nani?" He achieved national and regional recognition with his 2002 track "Manzi wa Nairobi," a song which praised the beauty of Kenyan women and a follow-up single "Weh Kamu". He went on to release his debut album Hanyaring Game in late 2004, which included the hit "Keroro," a Kenyan slang (sheng) term for alcohol. Nonini is famed for releasing the first Genge hits early in his career.

He runs a video production company named "Pro Habo" which successfully gave rise to P Unit. He is also a radio presenter.

Nonini also owns a clothing apparel line "Mgenge2RU".

He is currently based in the U.S.

== Collaborations and affiliated acts ==
Later, Nani Mwenza, his collaboration track with Tanzanian musician Juma Nature, became a regional hit. In addition, he has collaborated with local artiste Nameless to create a Friday anthem appropriately titled "furahi-day". Both songs are on his second album Mwisho Ya Mawazo, released in 2007. The album features several guest musicians, including Nyota Ndogo, Mercy Myra, Professor Jay and Q-Chief.

=== P-Unit ===
He is the founder of P-Unit (Pro-Habo Unit), which consists of rappers Bonnie, Frasha, Gabu and himself. The crew has produced several songs, most notably "Si Lazima", a Swahili phrase which literally translates to "It's not a must." The song talks of times in a relationship when a couple does not need to have sex – they can just go home and relax. People have found the song quite contradictory to the messages he communicated in previous songs. At the 2007 Kisima Music Awards, P-Unit won the Boomba Group category. It was the first time Nonini won a Kisima Award. Their second single is known as "Kushoto-Kulia"; meaning "Left-Right". Both songs are on Nonini's "Mwisho ya Mawazo" album.

== Recognition and awards ==
In August 2007, Nonini was selected as one of the 100 most influential Kenyans by The Standard newspaper. In 2009 he was named International Lifestyle Ambassador by the Limkokwing University in Malaysia.

Noni was honored with the MCSK 2012 Cross Over Artiste Award and won Best Hip-Hop Song and Best Director of a Music Video, both for Colour Kwa Face, at the 2012 Kisima Awards.

Nonini has been a two-time Top Earner MCSK Royalties Artiste.

In 2013 Nonini was elected as a director representing the Audio Visual Sector at the Performance Rights Society of Kenya (PRSK), where he expects to help in consolidating efforts towards royalties' collections and represent the plight of artistes in the entertainment industry.

== Discography ==
Albums:

- Hanyaring Game (2004)
- Mwisho ya Mawazo (2007)
- Godfather (2009)

== Awards ==
Won:

- 2004 Chaguo La Teeniez Awards – Best Male Artist
- 2007 Chaguo La Teeniez Awards – Best Song ("Si Lazima") & Best Collaboration ("Si Lazima") & Best Group (P-Unit)
- 2007 Kisima Music Awards Boomba Group (P-Unit).
- 2008 Chaguo La Teeniez Awards – Best Music Video ("Mtoto Mzuri") & Best Group (P-Unit)
- 2008 Kisima Music Awards Boomba Group (P-Unit), Best Collaboration (P-Unit & DNA – "Una").
- 2009 Named the International Lifestyle Ambassador by Limkokwing University. This award has also been granted to distinguished VIP's such as Mel Gibson, Bruce Davey, Miss England 2008, Miss India 2006, Eric Way (Sex and the City), Miss Botswana, HE Prince Andrew, HE Festus Mogae (President Of Botswana), Prime Minister of Malaysia. The award is in line with the University's of building the skills of their young citizens, particularly in the area of new technology, of Sound and Music, Film and Television and other creative courses.
- 2012 Award for the highest played Artists Across all media stations in the Music Copyright Society of Kenya Awards 2012

Nominated:

- 2008 MTV Africa Music Awards – Listener's Choice (P-Unit & DNA – "Una").
- 2008 Pearl of Africa Music Awards – Best Male (Kenya)
- Nominated for the Best International Afrobeats Act in the Black Entertainment, Film, Fashion, Television and Arts (BEFTA) Awards UK.
