= Mbuvi =

Dr Mbuvi
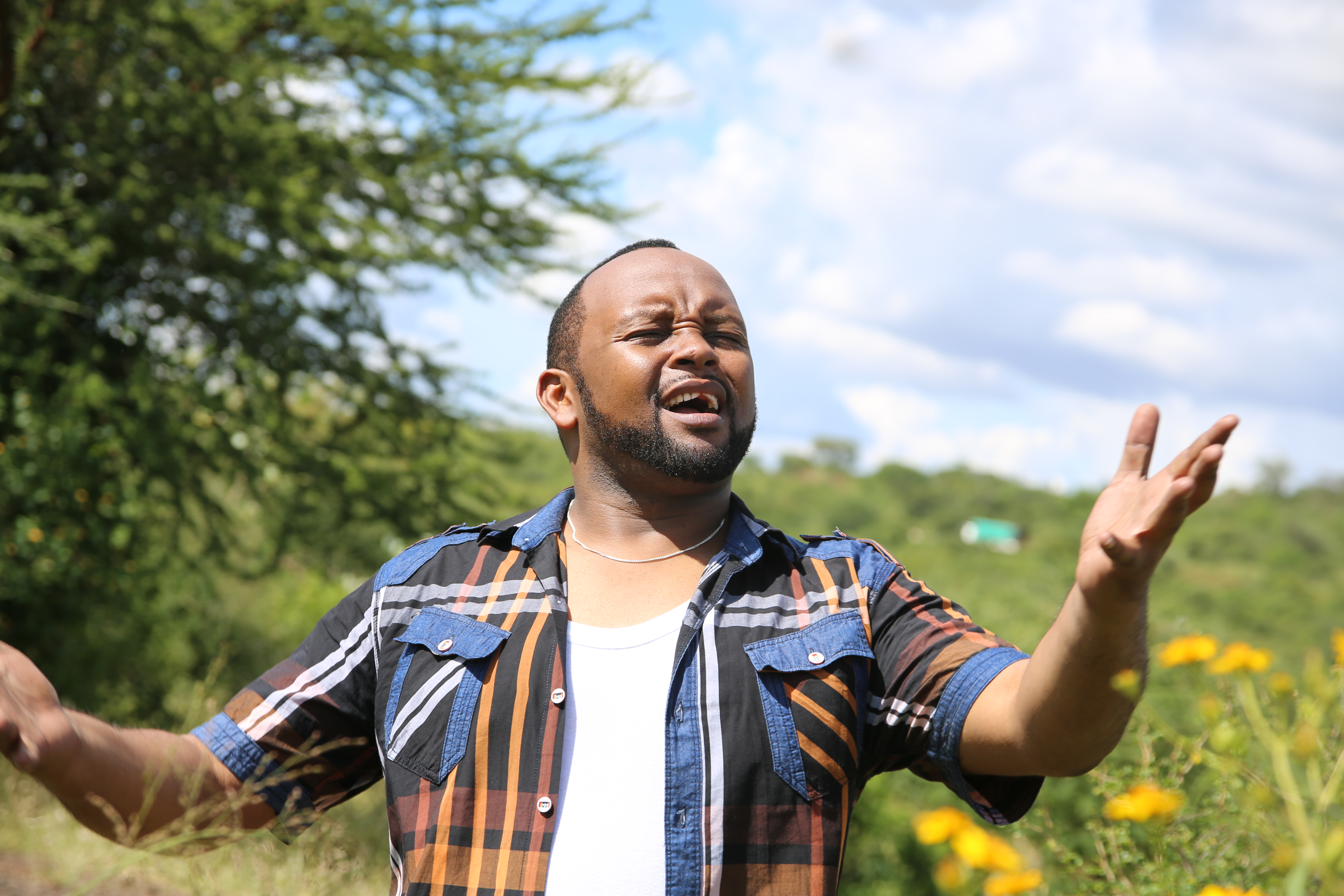
- Dr Mbuvi in 2013

Background information
- Also known as: Dr Mbuvi
- Born: Victor Mbuvi
- Origin: Kenya
- Genres: Christian, Gospel music
- Years active: 2000–present
- Label: Panache Plume

Dr Mbuvi is a Kenyan award-winning contemporary gospel singer, comedian, and TV presenter. Born Victor Mbuvi, he drew his love for music from his childhood and inspiration from his mother who died in 1999, a year before Dr Mbuvi launched his music career. Dr Mbuvi joined a group called His Image, who performed a cappella and various renditions of other artistes' works. We even modernised a Luo gospel folk song Niwara Nono. In 2001, he briefly teamed up with music producer R Kay and a friend to form Injili Group, which recorded Nisamehe – his first ever hit song.

== Background ==
Dr Mbuvi went to Kionyweni Primary School in Machakos County, and then moved to Unity Primary in Umoja Estate in Nairobi when his parents got transfers. His father worked as an auditor and his mother was a banker. He later joined Lenana School, where he played rugby. He then joined Moi University for a Bachelor of Science degree in physics and later pursued a master's degree in computer based information systems, at the University of Sunderland, UK.

Dr Mbuvi however decided to pursue his music career instead of what he had studied.

== Awards ==
- 2011 Kisima Music Awards, Benga Artiste of the Year
- Groove Awards, Eastern Song of the Year (2010)
- Groove Awards, Traditional Song of the Year (2009)
- Kisima Music Awards, Ethnic Fusion Artiste of the year (2008)
- Kisima Music Awards, R&B Artiste of the Year (2005)

== TV Hosting ==
In 2008, Dr Mbuvi hosted a TV called "The Day" on DSTV channel 311.
