= Eric Wainaina (musician) =

Kenyan singer-songwriter (born 1973)

Eric Wainaina (born 28 August 1973) is a Kenyan singer.

== Childhood ==
Wainaina was born in Nairobi, Kenya, to George Gitaū Wainaina and Margaret Wangarì Wainaina. He has one brother, Simon Wainaina. His love for music started at a young age. He got a piano at age 4, originally intended for his brother Simon who instead took keen interest in football. Wainaina thus begrudgingly took piano lessons. He actively participated in the choir throughout elementary and high school at St. Mary's School, Nairobi, save for a short stint in basketball. Whilst growing up, Wainaina was influenced musically by international artists such as Papa Wemba, Youssou N'Dour, Lokua Kanza and Paul Simon.

== Early career ==
Wainaina first stepped into the world of music with Five Alive, a gospel a cappella group. Five Alive consisted of Victor Seii, Bob Kioko, Chris Kamau, and David Mageria, who was replaced by Joe Kiragū. They drew their musical influence from Ladysmith Black Mambazo and Take 6. Dominating Kenya's airwaves in 1995, Five Alive released their debut album Five Alive in 1996, and even went on to tour Europe the same year. His experience with the group convinced Wainaina to pursue a professional career in music. In 1996 he performed and appeared in the video for "Get in the Driver's Seat", a song commissioned by the United Nations Drug Control Programme for a highly successful anti-drug campaign spanning 20 countries. This not only set the stage for his eventual emergence as a solo artist, but also got him into the social concern and activism that characterizes much of his music.

When the group disbanded in 1997, Wainaina went on to join the Berklee College of Music in the US city of Boston, from which he graduated with a degree in music, majoring in songwriting and record engineering. He graduated with honors.

During his years at Berklee, Wainaina and his band traveled around the country to perform, as well as holding regular shows in Boston. Together with his producer, Christian Kaufmann, he worked to produce a sound that would be distinctively Kenyan both in the music and the content of the lyrics. In order to do this, he made sure that he released a new track every time he returned home for vacation, This was well received by his growing fanbase, with his performance at Kenya's Beats of the Season concert in December 2000 being watched live by 15,000 fans and broadcast nationally.

== Rising popularity ==
His notable releases include "Daima Kenya", a song that instantly made him Kenya's favorite modern musician. After the 1998 terrorist bombing in Nairobi where over 200 Kenyans died, "Daima Kenya" was adopted as the unofficial song of mourning, receiving extensive radio and TV airplay nationwide. His adaptation of a Kikuyu folk tune "Rìtwa Rìaku" was added to the playlist of every radio station in the nation soon after.

Wainaina returned to the top of Kenya's musical agenda after he released "Nchi ya Kitu Kidogo" [Country of small things] (colloquial for bribe) in 2001, a song that launched his crusade against rampant corruption in the country. With the chart success of "Nchi ya Kitu Kidogo", Wainaina received international accolades. Transparency International (Kenya) supported him as an artist who would help educate people on the negativity of corruption, appointing him an ambassador. He was also appointed ambassador for the NGO MS Kenya, Kenya Human Rights Commission and by the Kenya National Commission on Human Rights for his commitment to fighting the abuses to justice through music. This anthem against corruption ("Nchi ya Kitu Kidogo") was not so highly appreciated in all quarters, however, with the government of the day putting up resistance to it by refusing to air it on the national broadcaster, Kenya Broadcasting Corporation. In one instance several attempts were made to keep him from performing at a national event, the Kenya Music Festival, including intimidation and attempts to switch off his microphone.

Following the suspicious death of Father Anthony Kaiser in 2000, Wainaina was commissioned by the Mill Hill Fathers in 2003 to write a song about this. This became "Ukweli", a call for justice despite efforts that were being made to cover up the true nature of Father Kaiser's death, which was reported as suicide despite strong evidence to the contrary.

In 2001, Africa Almanac.com listed him amongst the top 100 Africans of the year 2000, which included high-profile names such as Nelson Mandela, Joseph Kabila, Yash Pal Ghai, Baaba Maal and Ousmane Sembène. His first record, Sawa Sawa, released in 2001, remains one of the highest-selling solo albums in the country.

Wainaina returned home from Berklee in August 2002 after his graduation with two degrees. He was also honored with the Jack Maher award for his exceptional performance as a songwriter. The annual award is given to students who have been recognized for their potential to become leaders in the international music industry.

Wainaina's music has international appeal. He received the MNET (South Africa) award for favorite male vocalist in February 2001, and, together with Henrie Mutuku, was one of the first Kenyans to receive an award for Best East African Artist at the pan-African 7th annual KORA All Africa Music Awards on 2 November 2002. He is also the only Kenyan artist to have performed live at the KORA ceremony. He was nominated for another KORA Award in 2003, and in 2005 he received his third Kora nomination, this time for the prestigious Artist of the Decade award.

In 2002, he played at the launch of the International Criminal Court at the UN Headquarters in New York, presided over by Kofi Annan. He has toured in Switzerland for four consecutive years and performed at the Netherlands' Festival Mundial in 2003. The same year he performed at the Harare International Festival of the Arts (HIFA). After the concert he criticized Zimbabwe's president Robert Mugabe in a media briefing prompting Zimbabwe's state-owned media to give him unfavorable reviews. He also performed at the 2004 Sauti za Busara festival in Zanzibar, a celebration of East African Music.

In December 2004 Wainaina premiered a 21- song musical theater piece, Lwanda, Man of Stone, based on a local folk story. One of the first of its kind in Kenya, the show ran for a hugely successful season, and a concert version of the same show continues to be performed at major cultural events. A contemporary adaptation of this musical, Lwanda-A Ghetto Story had a very successful run at the GoDown Arts Centre, Nairobi, in December 2006. Plans are underway to find a permanent home for Lwanda in Nairobi.

Together with Mūmbi Kaigwa and Andrea Kalima, Eric co-wrote and arranged the music for Kigezi Ndoto, a Kenyan play written and directed by Kaigwa, which went on tour in Europe under the auspices of the World Theatre Music Festival – 2006. He has also written the music for Owen and Mzee, an upcoming documentary about the touching story of an unusual friendship between a tortoise and a baby hippo at the Kenyan coast. This documentary is based on a best-selling children's book by the same name.

Wainaina was involved in the 2006 launch of Kenya's National Civic Education Program (NCEP II), Uraia, which aims at fostering a mature political culture in Kenya: a culture in which citizens are able to exercise their rights and responsibilities—and to participate effectively in the broadening of democracy. Wainaina also performed at the inaugural Nairobi-hosted North Sea Jazz Festival in February 2006, and at the Netherlands-based version of the same in July 2006.

December 2006 saw the release of "Twende, Twende", his second solo album. He was among 100 most influential Kenyans as selected by The Standard newspaper in August 2007.

He produced the musical Mo Faya, shown at the 2009 New York Musical Theatre Festival. Wainaina himself also features in the musical as a singer. It is directed by John Sibi-Okumu. www.mofayathemusical.com

2009 proved to be a very fruitful year for Eric. He composed the music for the film, from a whisper, which won the Best Director, Best Screenplay, Best Picture, Best Original Soundtrack and AMAA Achievement in Editing awards, in the African movie 2009 awards.

Eric was also commissioned in 2010 to write the UN-MDG anthem to be performed at the closing ceremony of the Fifa world cup in South Africa to be performed alongside Jimmy Dludlu, Baaba Maal and Angelique Kidjo.

In 2013 Eric was designated a National UN Goodwill Ambassador for the United Nations Environmental Program (UNEP) alongside fellow Kenyan singer Suzanna Owiyo.

Eric Wainaina performed during Mata Amritanandamayi's 60th Birthday Celebrations at Amritapuri, Kerala, India on 26 September 2013.

== Personal life ==
Wainaina married his fiancée of five years, Sheba Hirst, on 29 February 2008. They have two children, Seben, born in April 2006 and Neo born in October 2009.

== Discography ==
=== Studio albums ===
- 2001 Sawa Sawa
- 2006 Twende Twende
- 2011 Love and Protest
- 2018 Dreams in Stereo

=== Others ===
- 2003 Ukweli (single)
- 2004 "Lwanda, Man of Stone" (musical)
- 2006 Kigezi Ndoto (producer & arranger)
- 2006 Owen & Mzee
- 2006 Lwanda – A Ghetto Story (musical)
- 2009 Mo Faya (Musical)
- 2010 Tinga Tinga Tales

== Awards ==
Won:

- 2002 Kora Awards – Best East Africa Artist
- 2007 Kisima Music Awards – Best Afro-fusion & Best Song & Best Video.

Nominated:

- 2003 Kora Awards – Best East Africa Artist
- 2007 Pearl of Africa Music Awards – Best Kenyan Male Artiste.
- 2008 Kisima Music Awards – Best Urban Fusion
