= Pace Kenya =

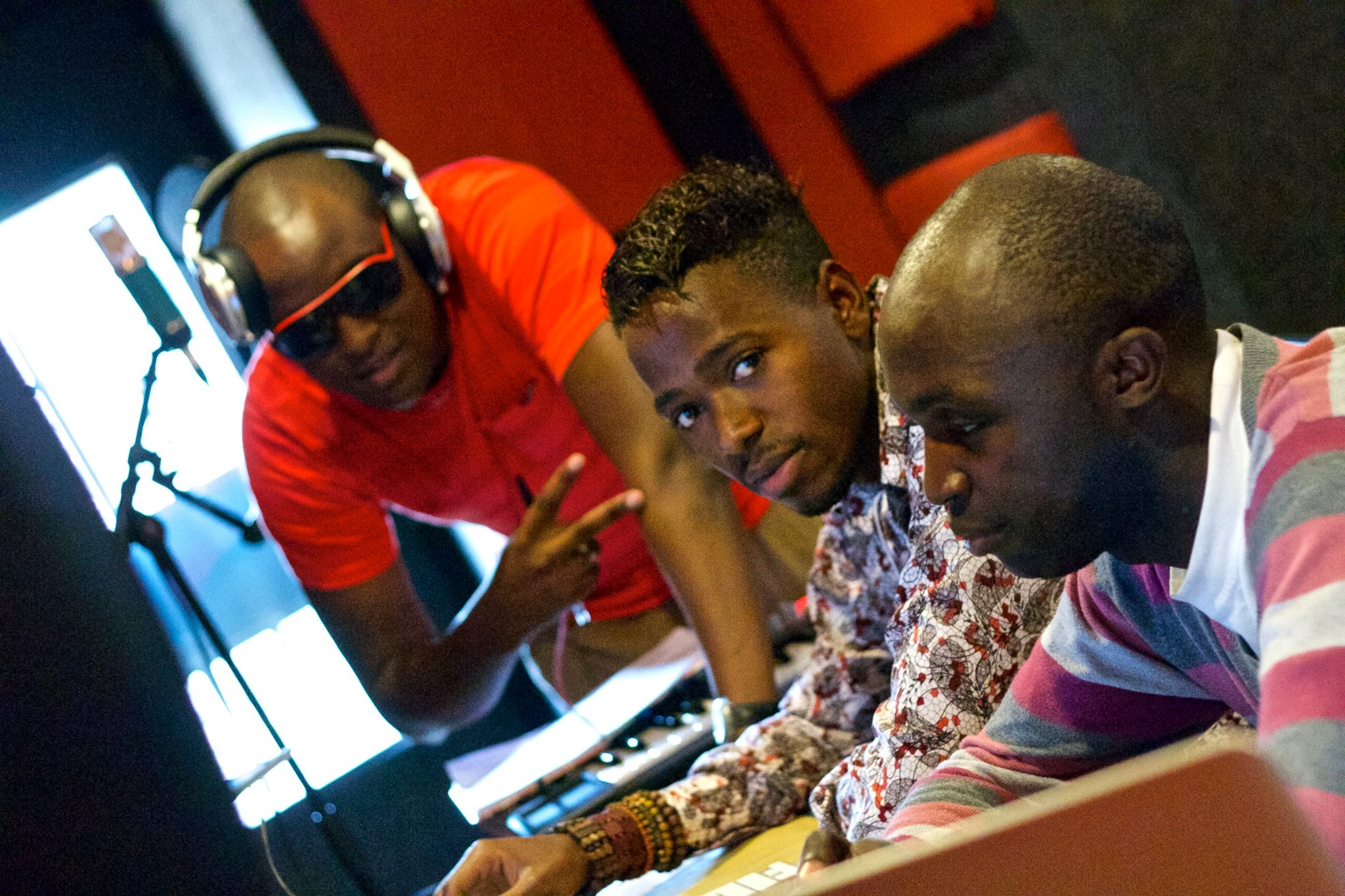
Pace at the Studio

Ian Gituku, known as Pace Kenya, is a rapper, singer, audio engineer from Kenya. He started music at a very early age of 14 years playing the piano in his primary school, Gilgil Hills and proceeded to better his musical career onto his secondary school years. Pace worked as a solo artist at Studio 15 and then joined J.M.E Records in 2010 to release his first song "Go Bananas".

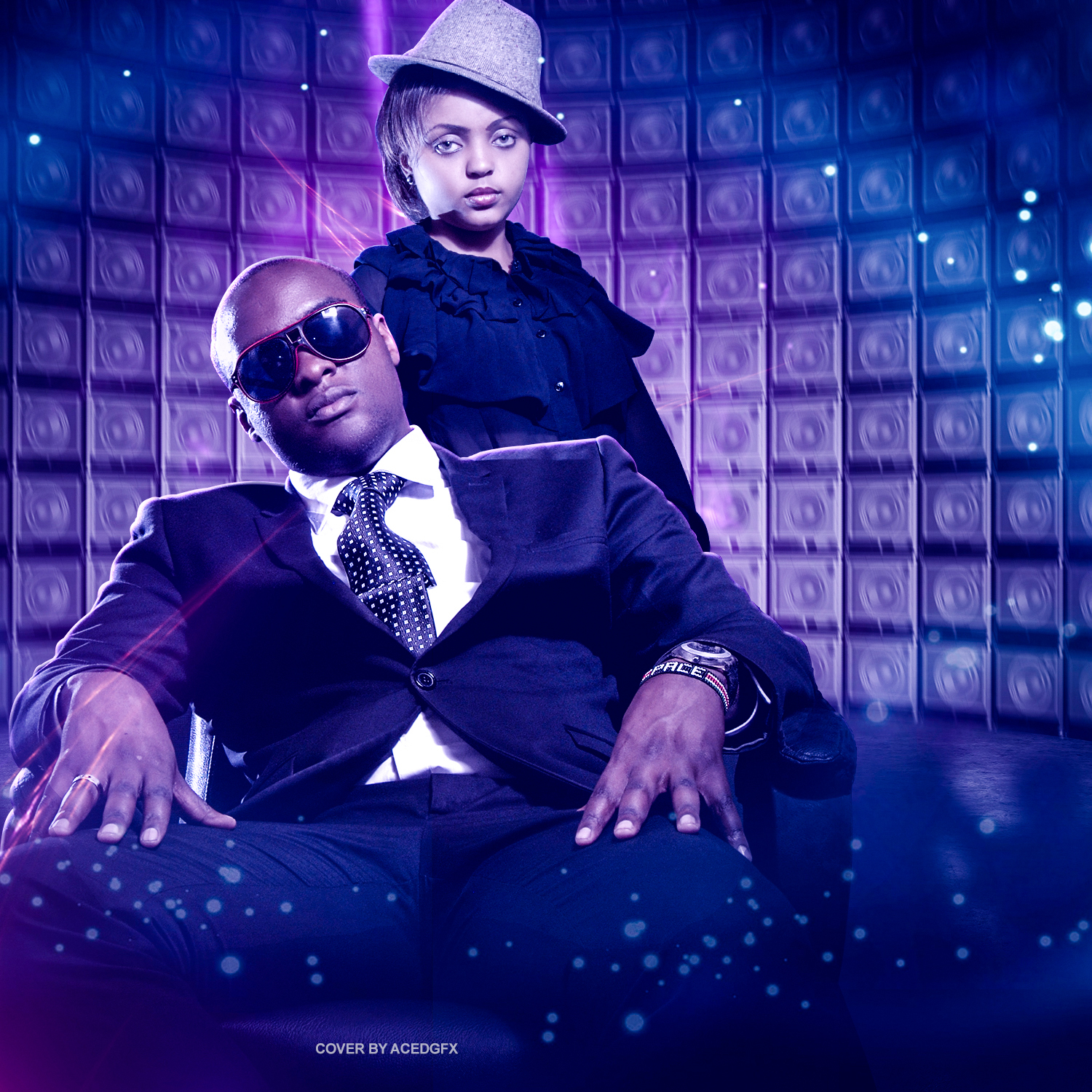
Songa

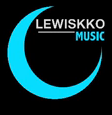
Management
