= Pilipili =

Kenyan musician and singer (born 1982)

- Born: November 1982 (age 43–44)
- Citizenship: Kenya
- Occupation: Musician

Peter Gatonye (born November 1982), known better for his stage name Pilipili, is a musician/singer from Kenya. At the beginning of his career, he collaborated with another musician, Gun B. Their best known song was "Nampenda". He also did a song with Ratatat. The song was called "Morale".

He is an award winner in Kisima and of Chaguo La Teeniez held in East Africa. Pilipili's debut album "Fungua Mlango" was released in late 2005 produced by Clemo through Calif Records in Nairobi. During the same year they both became artist of the year and producer of the year respectively. He is a respected songwriter especially in Swahili language. He has worked with great music producers like Tedd Josiah, Chris Adwar, Ogopa DJs among others. He is known for hits such as Kamata Dem, Mpaka che, Morale, Iweje, among others.

His former partner, Gun B (Robert Misiani), died on 20 October 2007 due to illness. Gun B was the son of famous benga musician Daniel Owino Misiani.
