= Nyota Ndogo =

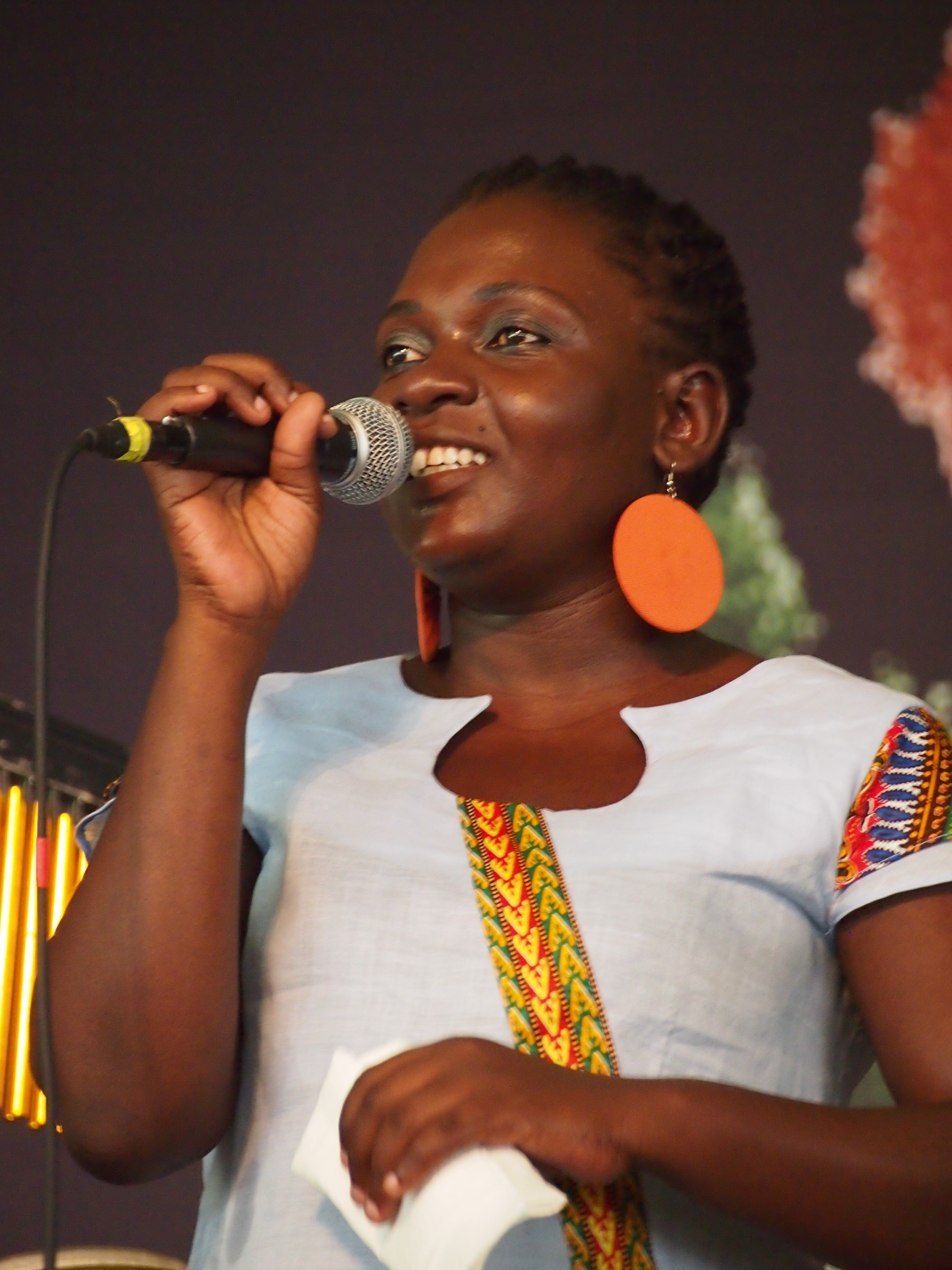
Nyota Ndogo performing at 2014 Smithsonian Folk Festival

Nyota Ndogo (real name Mwanaisha Abdalla, born c. 1981) is a musician from Kenya who performs taarab-influenced pop music.

== Music Career ==
Ndogo is from the coastal city of Mombasa. She was a school drop-out who worked as a housemaid. Her father, Abdala Atib, was a musician with a local band, but Nyota Ndogo did not take up a musical career until she was inspired by the hip hop group K-South's lyrics. She was discovered by Andrew Burchell, a Mombasa-based producer.

On February 29, 2020, Nyota Ndogo published her hit song Je Wewe in YouTube. The song received positive feedback from music lovers, her fans, and radio stations.

She released a new single entitled Mungu Wangu in April 2021.

=== Albums ===
Nyota Ndogo has released four albums: Chereko, Nimetoka Mbali Mpenzi and Mama Wakambo. Her song Take Care is featured on the international World 2003 compilation album, while Chereko is on the Rough Guide to the Music of Kenya compilation. The same track was also featured on the Rough Guides - Off the Beaten Track compilation.

=== Awards and nominations ===
She won Kisima Award for best Taarab singer in 2003 and Best female singer in 2005. She had three nominations for the 2008 Kisima Awards. She was nominated for the Best Kenyan female artiste at the 2007 PAM Awards. Her song Watu na Viatu was nominated for the best East African song at the 2007 Tanzania Music Awards.

=== Collaborations ===
She has collaborated with Nonini on the track Nibebe and with Necessary Noize on their track Nataka Toa. She also collaborated with Ally B on the hit song in East Africa named Ni Wangu. Nyota Ndogo later collaborated with the famous Tanzanian Artist known as Q Chilla, which was a success, leading her to collaborate with Mr. Blue, another well-known Tanzanian artist. As a result of this collaboration, she was among the artists nominated to perform at the Kilimanjaro Awards. In 2013, she also did another collaboration with Tember from Tanzania and Bobby Mapesa from Kenya on a hit song called Nawachanganya.

=== Performances ===
Nyota has represented Kenya in various festivals in East Africa, including Sauti za Busara and ZIFF in Zanzibar. She also represented Kenya in Comoros. Nyota has also performed in Dubai, Germany, and South Africa.

== Radio and Television Career ==
The Mombasa songbird was employed as a radio presenter at the famous radio station known as Baraka FM, which is based in Mombasa, Kenya. In 2013, she was among the judges in the biggest television show in East Africa, Tusker Project Fame. The same year, she won Best Coast Female Artist of the Year 2013. Her major song that hit the entire East African airwaves was Watu Na Viatu.
