= Calif Records =

Kenyan record label

- Parent company: Calif Entertainment Africa Co. Ltd
- Founded: 2000
- Founder: Clement Rapudo Jua Cali Nonini
- Distributor: Calif Music Group (KE) Warner Music
- Genre: Genge
- Country of origin: Kenya

Calif Records is a Kenyan record label based in Nairobi's California estate, known for the Genge genre of music.

It was founded in 2000 by record executive & producer Clement "Clemo" Rapudo, together with Juacali and Nonini. It is among two leading music production houses in Kenya, the other being Ogopa Deejays.

== Current artists ==
List of artists who have been signed to Calif Records at least some part of their career

- Jua Cali
- Nonini
- Mahatma

== Former Artists ==
- Vikki Ocean a.k.a. Raudy
- Masha
- Choku
- Circuite & Joel
- Flexx
- Jimw@t
- Lady S
- Czars
- Mahatma
- Nonini
- Pilipili
- Ratatat
- Mejja
- Size 8
