= Clemo =

Kenyan music producer

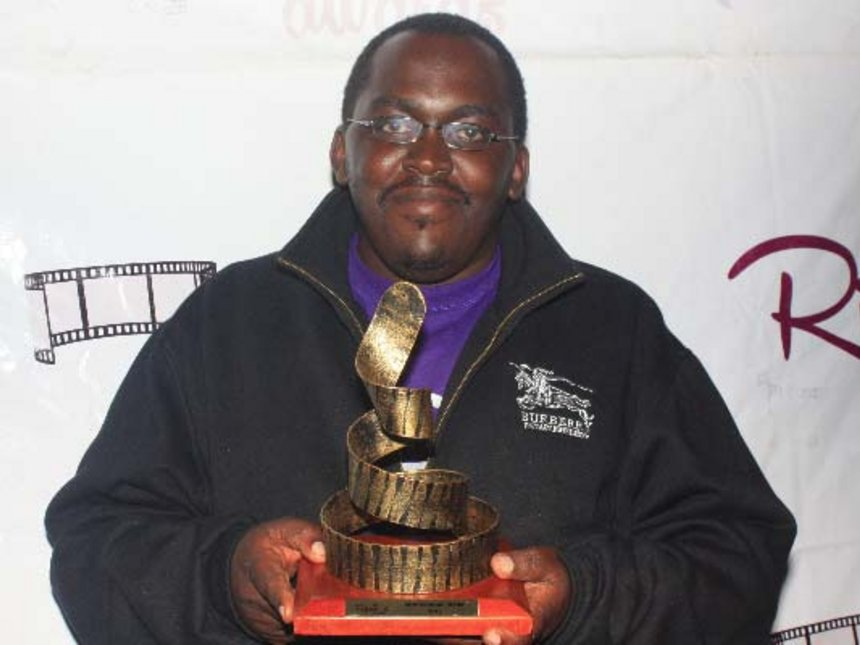
- Clemo at the Riverwood awards
- Born: Clement Rapudo Sijenyi; June 2, 1980 (age 45); Nairobi, Kenya
- Occupations: Producer, Songwriter, Entrepreneur
- Years active: 1999–present
- Website: www.ngomma.com

Clement Rapudo Sijenyi (born June 2, 1980) better known as Clemos, is a music producer and co-founder of Calif Records based in Life Ministry House near Hurlingham Business Center along Jabavu Road in Nairobi, Kenya.

== Career ==
He won an award for "Producer of the Year" at the 2007 Chaguo La Teeniez awards (CHAT Awards). He won the 2005 Best Producer category at the Kisima Music Award and was nominated for the 2006 competition.

He is the founder of Ngomma VAS, a Multi Channel Network that distributes local music to various media houses in Kenya and abroad.
