= Adhola dialect =

Dialect of Southern Luo of Uganda

Adhola
- Dhopadhola
- Native to: Uganda
- Region: Tororo District
- Ethnicity: Adhola people
- Native speakers: 480,000 (2014 census)
- Language family: Nilo-Saharan?: Eastern Sudanic?; Kir–Abbaian?; Nilotic; Western Nilotic; Luo; Southern; Adhola–Alur–Luo; Adhola–Luo; Adhola

Language codes
- ISO 639-3: adh
- Glottolog: adho1243

Adhola, also known as Jopadhola and Ludama, is a dialect of Southern Luo spoken by the Adhola people (a.k.a. Jopadhola or Badama) of Uganda. Dhopadhola is generally mutually intelligible with Acholi, Kumam, Lango and Alur of Uganda and Dholuo of Kenya.

The prefix dho means "language of". It can be attached to a nationality or speech community to imply the language of such a people. jo means "people of". The infix pa means possessive 'of'.

Dhopadhola thus means the language spoken in Padhola.
Padhola is the area or region where Dhopadhola is spoken.
Jopadhola is the plural of Japadhola; a person who speaks Dhopadhola. Hence, Jopadhola are speakers of Dhopadhola.

Ja is a prefix meaning the 'doer' or a person belonging to a particular place or position. The plural is Jo. That is, people who do something or belong to a particular place or organisation.

For instance
Jafwonji means a teacher.
Jofwonji means teachers.
Jawer means a singer.
Jower means singers.
Janywol means a parent.
Jonywol means parents.
Japach means a carpenter.
Jopach means carpenters.
