= Dholuo =

Language of the Luo people found in Kenya, Uganda and Tanzania

Luo
- Dholuo
- Native to: Kenya and Tanzania
- Region: Nyanza province of Kenya and Mara Region of Tanzania
- Ethnicity: Joluo
- Native speakers: 4.2 million (2009 census)
- Language family: Nilo-Saharan?: Eastern Sudanic?; Southern Eastern?; Nilotic; Western Nilotic; Luo; Southern Luo; Adhola-Alur-Luo; Acoli-Luo; Luo
- Writing system: Latin script Luo script

Language codes
- ISO 639-2: luo
- ISO 639-3: luo
- Glottolog: luok1236

Dholuo (pronounced [d̪ólúô]) or Nilotic Kavirondo, is a dialect of the Luo group of Nilotic languages, spoken by about 4.2 million Luo people of Kenya and Tanzania, who occupy parts of the eastern shore of Nam Lolwe (Lake Victoria) and areas to the south. It is used in broadcasts on Ramogi TV and KBC (Kenya Broadcasting Corporation, formerly the Voice of Kenya).

Dholuo is mutually intelligible with the Acholi, Alur and Adhola languages of Uganda. Dholuo and the aforementioned Uganda languages are all linguistically related to Dholuo of South Sudan and Anuak of Ethiopia due to common ethnic origins of the larger Luo peoples who speak Luo languages.

Four primary Dholuo dialects exist. These do not have their own names but are purely geographical: northwestern, south-central, east-central, and south. All dialects are highly mutually intelligible, and mainly differ in lexis.

It is estimated that Dholuo has 93% lexical similarity with Dhopadhola (Adhola), 90% with Leb Alur (Alur), 83% with Leb Achol (Acholi). However, these are often counted as separate languages despite common ethnic origins due to linguistic shift occasioned by geographical movement.

== Literacy (Of the Luo from South Nyanza) ==
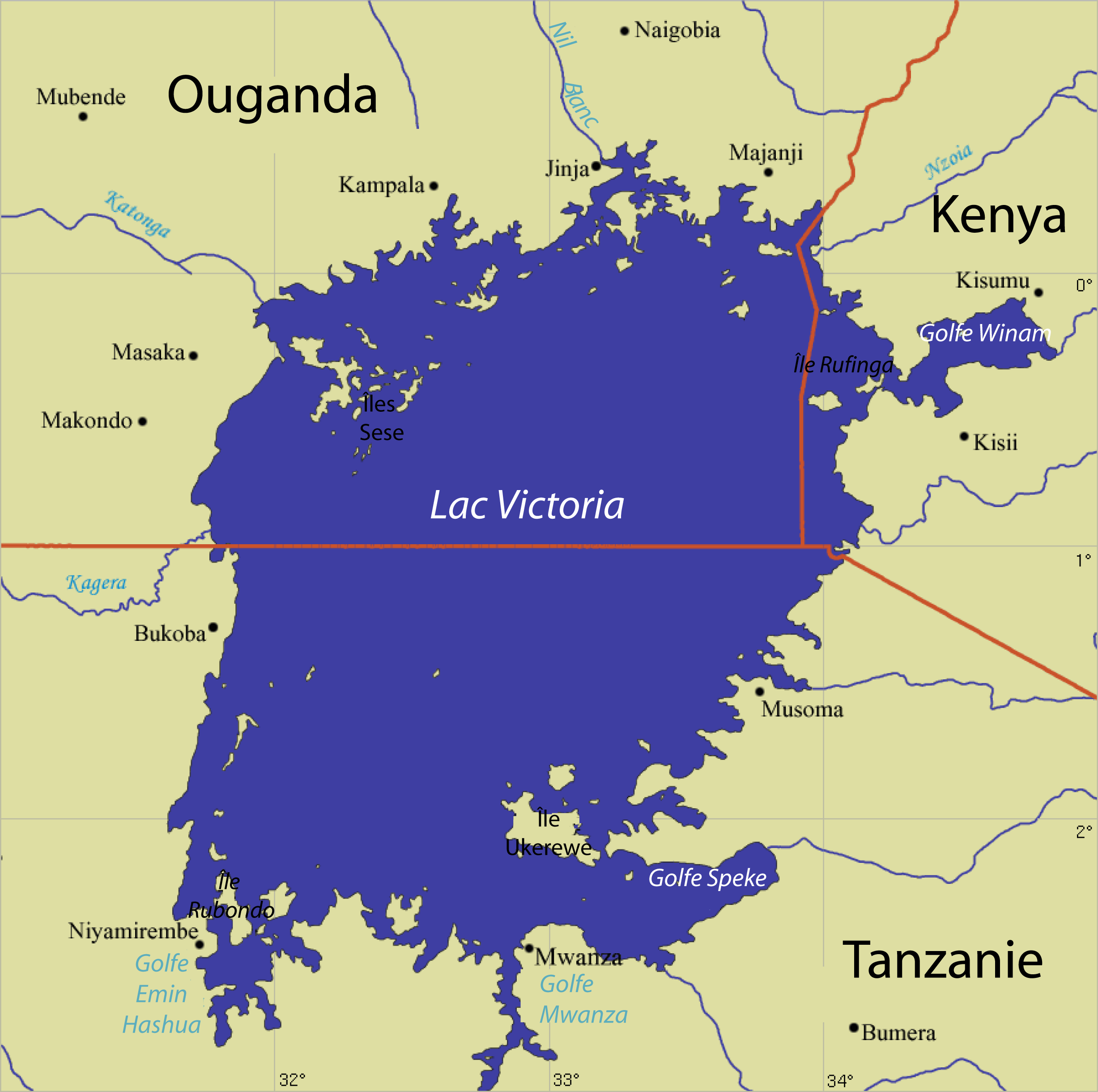
Contains the area in which the Seventh-day Adventist British East Africa Mission worked. Rusinga Island and the town of Kisii are marked.

The foundations of the Dholuo written language and today's Dholuo literary tradition, as well as the modernization of the Joluo people in Kenya, began in 1907. It began with the arrival of a Canadian-born Seventh-day Adventist missionary Arthur Asa Grandville Carscallen, whose missionary work over a period of about 14 years along the eastern shores of Lake Victoria left a legacy. (This applies only to the Luo of Southern Nyanza, which are to the East of Lake Victoria). This legacy continues today through the Obama family of Kenya and the Seventh-day Adventist Church to which the Obamas and many other Joluo converted in the early part of the 20th century. The Obamas of Kenya are relatives of former US president Barack Obama.

From 1906 to 1921, Carscallen was superintendent of the Seventh-day Adventist Church's British East Africa Mission, and was charged with establishing missionary stations in eastern Kenya near Lake Victoria and proselytizing among the local population. These stations would include Gendia, Wire Hill, Rusinga Island, Kanyadoto, Karungu, Kisii (Nyanchwa), and Kamagambo. In 1913, he acquired a small press for the Mission and set up a small printing operation at Gendia in order to publish church materials, but also used it to impact education and literacy in the region.

Over a period of about five years administering to largely Jaluo congregations, Carscallen achieved a mastery of the Dholuo language and was credited with being the first to reduce the language to writing, publishing the Elementary grammar of the Nilotic-Kavirondo language (Dhö Lwo), together with some useful phrases, English-Kavirondo and Kavirondo-English vocabulary, and some exercises were key to the same in 1910. Then, a little more than two years later, the mission translated portions of the New Testament from English to Dholuo, which were later published by the British and Foreign Bible Society.

In 2019, the Jehovah’s Witnesses released the New World Translation of the Holy Scriptures in the Luo language. The Bible translation is distributed without charge, both in print and online.

The grammar textbook Carscallen produced was widely used for many years throughout eastern Kenya, but his authorship of it is largely forgotten. It was later retitled Dho-Luo for Beginners and republished in 1936. In addition to the grammar text, Carscallen compiled an extensive dictionary of "Kavirondo" (Dholuo) and English, which is housed at the School of Oriental and African Studies, University of London, UK. Neither of these works has been superseded, only updated, with new revised versions of the linguistic foundation that Carscallen established in 1910.

== Phonology ==
=== Vowels ===
Dholuo has two sets of five vowels, distinguished by the feature [±ATR] which is carried primarily on the first formant. While ATR is phonemic in the language, various phonological vowel harmony processes play a major role and can change the ATR of the vowel at output. A current change in certain dialects of Dholuo is that certain pronouns seem to be losing the ATR contrast and instead use [±ATR] in free variance.

[−ATR] vowels in Dholuo
	Front	Central	Back
Near-close	ɪ		ʊ
Mid	ɛ		ɔ
Open		ɐ	

[+ATR] vowels in Dholuo
	Front	Central	Back
Close	i		u
Mid	e		o
Open		a	

=== Consonants ===
In the table of consonants below, orthographic symbols are included between angle brackets following the IPA symbols. Note especially the following: the use of ⟨y⟩ for /j/, common in African orthographies; ⟨th⟩, ⟨dh⟩ are plosives, not fricatives as in Swahili spelling (but phoneme /d̪/ can fricativize intervocalically).

Phonetic inventory of consonants in Dholuo
		Labial	Dental	Alveolar	Palatal	Velar	Glottal
Nasal		m ⟨m⟩		n ⟨n⟩	ɲ ⟨ny⟩	ŋ ⟨ngʼ⟩	
Plosive	prenasalized	ᵐb ⟨mb⟩		ⁿd ⟨nd⟩	ᶮɟ ⟨nj⟩	ᵑɡ ⟨ng⟩	
Plosive	voiceless	p ⟨p⟩	t̪ ⟨th⟩	t ⟨t⟩	c ⟨ch⟩	k ⟨k⟩	
Plosive	voiced	b ⟨b⟩	d̪ ⟨dh⟩	d ⟨d⟩	ɟ ⟨j⟩	ɡ ⟨g⟩	
Fricative		f ⟨f⟩		s ⟨s⟩			h ⟨h⟩
Trill				r ⟨r⟩			
Approximant		w ⟨w⟩		l ⟨l⟩	j ⟨y⟩		

=== Phonological characteristics ===
Dholuo is a tonal language. There is both lexical tone and grammatical tone, e.g. in the formation of passive verbs. It has vowel harmony by ATR status: the vowels in a noncompound word must be either all [+ATR] or all [−ATR]. The ATR-harmony requirement extends to the semivowels /w/, /ɥ/.

== Grammar ==
=== Pronouns ===
Dholuo has both emphatic and non-emphatic pronoun forms. The latter includes both prefixal and suffixal forms – no non-emphatic pronoun forms can be used as free morphemes.

	Emphatic	Non-emphatic	
	Emphatic	Prefixal	Suffixal
1sg	an	a-	-a
1pl	wan	wa-	-wa
2sg	in	i-	-i
2pl	un	u-	-u
3sg	en	o-	-e ~ -go
3pl	gin	gi-	-gi

==== Distributives ====
Dholuo exhibits the following distributive pronouns:

'Each' (person)	ng'ato ka ng'ato
'Each' (thing)	moro ka moro
'Any' (person)	ng'ato ang'ata
'Any' (thing)	moro a mora

=== Nouns ===
Nouns (nyinge) can be masculine, feminine, or neuter. The masculine and feminine are used for people and animals with respectively masculine or feminine natural gender. The neuter is used for all other nouns.

Nouns only change their form when put in the genitive. Most genitives are highly irregular. The majority of genitives, though, end in a consonant.

=== Possession ===
Dholuo is notable for its complex phonological alternations, which are used, among other things, in distinguishing inalienable possession from alienable. The first example is a case of alienable possession, as the bone is not part of the dog.

chogo guok
bone dog
'the dog's bone' (which it is eating)

The following is however an example of inalienable possession, the bone being part of the cow:

chok dhiang'
{bone (construct state)} cow
'a cow bone'

== Sample phrases ==
English	Luo
Hello	Misawa (ber)
How are you?	Idhi nade? Intie nade?
I'm fine.	Adhi maber.
What is your name?	Nyingi ng'a?
My name is…	Nyinga en…
I am happy to see you.	Amor neni.
Where do you come from?	In jakanye?
good morning	oyawore
good evening	oimore
God bless you.	Nyasaye ogwedhi.
good job	tich maber
Salvation	resruok
goodbye	oriti
I want water.	Adwaro pi.
I am thirsty.	Riyo deya. / Riyo omaka. / Riyo ohinga.
thank you	erokamano
child	nyathi
student (university student)	nyathi skul, japuonjre (ja mbalariany)
come	bi
go	dhiyo
take	kaw
return	dwok
come back	dwogi
sit	bedi
stand / stop	chung' / wee
hunger	kech
I am starved.	Kech kaya.
father	wuoro [Dinka] wur
mother	miyo [Dinka] mor mer
God	Nyasaye, Nyakalaga, Were, Obong'o ( Different names associated with different attributes of God)
Lord (God)	Ruoth (Nyasaye)
God is good	Nyasaye ber
help	kony [Dinka] ba kony
man	dichuo
woman	dhako
boy	wuoyi (wuowi)
girl	nyako [Dinka] nya
book	buk, [Alego/Seme] buge
youth	rawera
pen	randiki
shorts	onyasa
trousers	long'
table	mesa
plate	tao
lock	rarind, ralor
leader	jatelo
bring	kel
Go back there.	Dog kucha.
Come back here.	Duog ka.
ask / query	penj
question	penjo
run	ringi [Dinka]
walk	wuothi
jump	dum / chikri [Alego/Seme]
rain	koth
sun	chieng'
moon	dwe / duee
stars	sulwe
work	tich
fish	rech [Dinka]
cold	koyo
I want to eat.	Adwaro chiemo.
I have something to say	An gi wach
grandfather	kwaro [Dinka] / kwar
grandmother	dayo [Dinka] / day
white man	ja rachar / ombogo / ja wagunda
cow / cattle	dwasi / dhiang'
sing	wer [Dinka]
song	wer
good, beautiful	ber, jaber
bad	rach
marriage	kend [Dinka], "keny" is the process, "thiek" is the marriage
marry	kendo
tomorrow	kiny
today	kawuono
here	ka / kae
there (close by)	kacha / kocha
there (far)	kucho
child	nyathi
money	omenda / chung' / oboke / sendi / pesa
gun	bunde
gun fire	maj bunde
start	chaki
dream	leki
stand	chung'
abroad	loka
talk	wuo/los
sit	bedi
praise	pak
eat	chiem
fire	mach
I want ugali.	Adwaro kuon.
maize, corn	oduma, bando
maize and beans	nyoyo
taxi	matatu (Swahili)
farm	puodho (Alego-Ndalo)
plough / dig out	pur / kuny
flying (in the air)	fuyo
fly (insect)	lwang'ni
stream (river)	aora
lake	nam
ocean	ataro
please	asayi

== Bibliography ==
- Gregersen, Edgar (1961). Luo: A grammar (Thesis). Yale University.
- Stafford, Roy Lawrence (1967). An Elementary Luo Grammar: With Vocabularies. Nairobi: Oxford University Press. ISBN 9780196393964.
- Omondi, Lucia Ndong'a (1982). Heine, Bernd; Möhlig, Wilhelm J.G.; Rottland, Franz (eds.). The Major Syntactic Structures of Dholuo. Language and Dialect Atlas of Kenya. Vol. Supplement 1. Berlin: Dietrich Reimer. ISBN 9783496005117.
- Tucker, Archibald Norman (1994). Creider, Chet A. (ed.). A grammar of Kenya Luo (Dholuo). Vol. 1–2. Köln: Rüdiger Köppe Verlag. ISBN 9783927620704.
- Okoth Okombo, Duncan (1997). A Functional Grammar of Dholuo. Nilo-Saharan. Vol. 12. Köln: Rüdiger Köppe Verlag. ISBN 9783896451309.
- Odaga, Asentha Bole (1997). English-Dholuo dictionary. Kisumu: Lake Publishers & Enterprises. ISBN 9789966847768.
- Odhiambo, Reenish Achieng; Aagard-Hansen, Jens (1998). Dholuo Course Book. Nairobi: Produced in collaboration with the Danish Bilharziasis Laboratory, Kenyan-Danish Health Research Project and Anglican Church of Kenya Language and Orientation School. ISBN 9789966966308.
- Jamieson Capen, Carole (2019) [1998]. Bilingual Dholuo-English dictionary, Kenya. Tucson: SIL Global. ISBN 9780966688108.
