= Northern Luo languages =

Subgroup of the Luo languages

Northern Luo
- Northern Lwoo
- Geographic distribution: Western Bahr el Ghazal, Pochalla County, Jonglei State, Upper Nile (state), Gambela Region, Lafon County
- Linguistic classification: Nilo-Saharan?: Eastern Sudanic; Southern Eastern; Nilotic; Western Nilotic; Northern Luo
- Proto-language: Proto-Northern Luo

Language codes
- ISO 639-3: –
- Glottolog: nort2814

The Northern Luo languages are a subgroup of the Luo languages that are spoken in South Sudan and Ethiopia.

== Classification ==
Northern Luo is classified by Glottolog as follows:

- Northern Lwoo
  - Anuak
  - Belanda Bor
  - Luwo-Thuri
    - Luwo
    - Thuri
  - Päri
  - Shilluk

According to Mechthild Reh, the Northern Luo languages are classified as follows:

- Northern Luo
  - Shilluk
  - Belanda Bor
  - Thuri
    - Jur
    - Anuak
    - Päri
