= Atuot people =

Nilotic ethnic group of South Sudan

Atuot
Total population
- approx. 116,000 (2017)

Regions with significant populations
- South Sudan (Lakes State)

Languages
- Atuot and Dinka

Religion
- Traditional African religion and Christianity

Related ethnic groups
- Dinka and Nuer

The Atuot (Reel/Apek) are a Nilotic ethnic group of South Sudan who live in Yirol in Lakes State. They comprise a majority of the population in Greater Yirol payam of Yirol West.

== Language ==
The Atuot people speak Reel, which was first recognized as a distinct language from Dinka by anthropologist John Burton in 1987, and is widely spoken in Yirol West. It is a Western Nilotic language of the Dinka-Nuer group, closely related to the Nuer language and more distantly to the Luo languages. SIL International estimates that the number of Atuot Reel speakers is 50,000.

Atwot speakers distinguish two dialects to their language, Thok Reel Cieng Luai and Thok Reel Cieng Nhyam with the latter being the more lexically conservative of the two. Most Atwot are bilingual in Dinka and Atwot.

A distinctive feature of the language is its having three contrastive vowel lengths.

== Culture ==
The Atwot share much of their culture with their neighbours. Like the Dinka and Nuer, they are also semi-sedentary cattle-herding pastoralists, meaning that while they travel with their herds to grazing grounds, they do not go far from where they had started. There are six subsections of the Atuot: Jilek, Luac, Jikeyi (Rorkec), Kuek, Akot and Ajong. The Ajong subsection claims to speak their own dialect, known as Thok-ajong a hard version of Thok Reel. Jikeyi and Kuek speak Thok Reel Cieng Nhyam. The Luac, Jilek, and Akot speak Thok Reel Cieng Luai. In some moments, Apak (a Dinka section) is considered to be Atwot, but they speak Thong Apak which is a dialect of South Central Dinka.

=== Atwot country ===
There were approximately 24,700 Atwot at the time of the local dialect survey in 1987. SIL estimates that there were over 50,000 Atwot in 1998. The population of Yirol West in the 2008 Sudanese census was 103,190 although not all inhabitants of the municipality are Atwot.

== See also ==
- Demographics of South Sudan
- Geography of South Sudan
