= Reel language =

Nilotic language spoken in South Sudan

Reel
- Thuɔk ë Rëël
- Native to: South Sudan
- Ethnicity: Atwot
- Native speakers: 116,000 (2017)
- Language family: Nilo-Saharan?: Eastern Sudanic; Nilotic; Western Nilotic; Dinka-Nuer; Nuer-Reel; Reel
- Writing system: Latin

Language codes
- ISO 639-3: atu
- Glottolog: reel1238
- ELP: Reel

Reel, or Atwot, is a Nilotic language of South Sudan that is closely related to Nuer. They call themselves Reel; Atwot is their Dinka name.

== Phonology ==
=== Consonants ===
Consonants
		Labial	Dental	Alveolar	Palatal	Velar	Glottal
Nasal		m	n̪	n	ɲ	ŋ	
Plosive	Voiceless	p	t̪	t	c	k	ʔ
Plosive	Voiced	b	d̪	d	ɟ	ɡ	
Trill				r			
Approximant		w		lʲ	j		

/t̪/ alternates with [s], /c/ with [ç], and /p/ with [ɸ]. /ʔ/ becomes [ɦ] near breathy vowels.

=== Vowels ===
Vowels
	Front	Central	Back
Close	i		u
Close-mid	e		o
Open-mid	ɛ		ɔ
Low		a	

Reid (2010) finds seven vowel phonemes, considering voice quality and vowel length as suprasegmental distinctions. Vowels have two voice qualities (modal and breathy) and three lengths (short, long, and overlong).

=== Tones ===
Reel has three tones—high, low, and falling.

== See also ==
- Atwot people
- Nilotic languages
- Western Nilotic languages
