= Shilluk =

Shilluk may refer to:

- the Shilluk Kingdom
- the Shilluk people
- the Shilluk language
