= Nuer–Reel languages =

Nuer-Reel
- Geographic distribution: South Sudan, Ethiopia
- Linguistic classification: Nilo-Saharan?: Eastern Sudanic; Southern Eastern; Nilotic; Western Nilotic; Dinka-Nuer; Nuer-Reel
- Subdivisions: Nuer; Reel

Language codes
- Glottolog: nuer1245

The Nuer-Reel languages are a group of closely related Western Nilotic languages spoken in South Sudan and Ethiopia.
