= Jumjum people =

Ethnic group in South Sudan

Jumjum, Mabaan
Total population
- c. 92,000

Languages
- Mabaan

Religion
- Indigenous religion

Related ethnic groups
- Burun, Mabaan

Jumjum or Mabaan is an ethnic group in South Sudan. Most of its members are Muslims. The number of persons in this group is at about 92,000. They speak Mabaan, a Luo Nilotic language. They live in the Upper Nile.

== Culture ==
The Mabaan people speak Mabaan, and are mostly farmers and shepherds. Men and women work together to cultivate crops such as millet, sesame, and beans. The men also engage in hunting and fishing, while women collect fruits and grain. The women wear and make lingans (beads in the Mabaan language), for kids when the graduate or weddings. They can also be made for holidays. The Mabaan now reside in North Sudan/South Sudan near the Nile and migrated. They also live in various states in The United States of America, European countries like Norway, and Australia after the Civil War.

A 'rain chief' acts as the headman of each village. He possesses both political and religious power. His dwelling is characterized by village drums (Nuba's), heirloom weapons, and other symbolic insignia related to old Mabaan culture.

== Related Luo People ==
The Jumjum people are closely related to the Burun and the Mabaan people.

== Social life ==
The jumjum people believe in non-human spirits, they worship Dyong as their god.
