= Southern Burun language =

Nilotic language spoken in Sudan Plateau

Southern Burun
- Tüŋ Mäbaan
- Native to: South Sudan, Sudan
- Region: Upper Nile–Blue Nile border
- Ethnicity: Jumjum
- Native speakers: 180,000 (2017–2022)
- Language family: Nilo-Saharan?: Eastern Sudanic?; Southern Eastern?; Nilotic; Western; Luo; Northern; Mabaan–Burun; Burun; Southern Burun
- Dialects: Bwonyin; Ulu; Twok
- Writing system: Arabic; Latin

Language codes
- ISO 639-3: Either: mfz – Mabaan jum – Jumjum
- Glottolog: maba1272
- ELP: Mabaan

Southern Burun is a Western Nilotic language of South Sudan. It is a dialect continuum with Burun proper (Northern Burun), Mabaan/Ulu, and Jumjum (Arabic: جوم جوم).

== Sample Text ==
Sample texts from "Mabaan Dictionary".

Translation	Nyanna, when you go to Mulle's village, ask Mulle for my oil gourd the gourd that she borrowed the other day. When she gives it to you bring it in your hand so that I can pour out some of my oil because I don't have any left.
Latin Script	Ñanna,ne i ooddi ban Mullinyɛ,dala ne i toocca Mulliti te lwañgɔn ’ya lwañgɔn ’uannɛ ɛkɛ oŋiti. Dala ne i ’wondi owwa bieŋiti aŋka ’ya buaga luayi ñɔn ’ya acaan ’ya balka gɛɛl moki bɛɛ.

== Phonology ==
These are from the Jumjum dialect.

=== Vowels ===
Burun has 8 vowels. All vowels have long equivalents.

	Front	Back	
	Front	unrounded	rounded
Close	i		u
Near-close	ɪ		ʊ
Close-mid			
Open-mid	ɛ	ʌ	ɔ
Open	a		

=== Consonants ===
Burun has 20 consonants.

		Bilabial	Labiodental	Dental	Alveolar	Palatal	Velar	Glottal
Stop	voiceless	p			t	c	k	ʔ
Stop	voiced	b			d	ɟ	g	
Fricative	voiceless			θ				
Fricative	voiced			ð				
Nasal		m	ɱ		n	ɲ	ŋ	
Approximant		w			l	j		
Trill					r			
