= Shilluk people =

Nilotic ethnic group of South Sudan

Shilluk
Cøllø
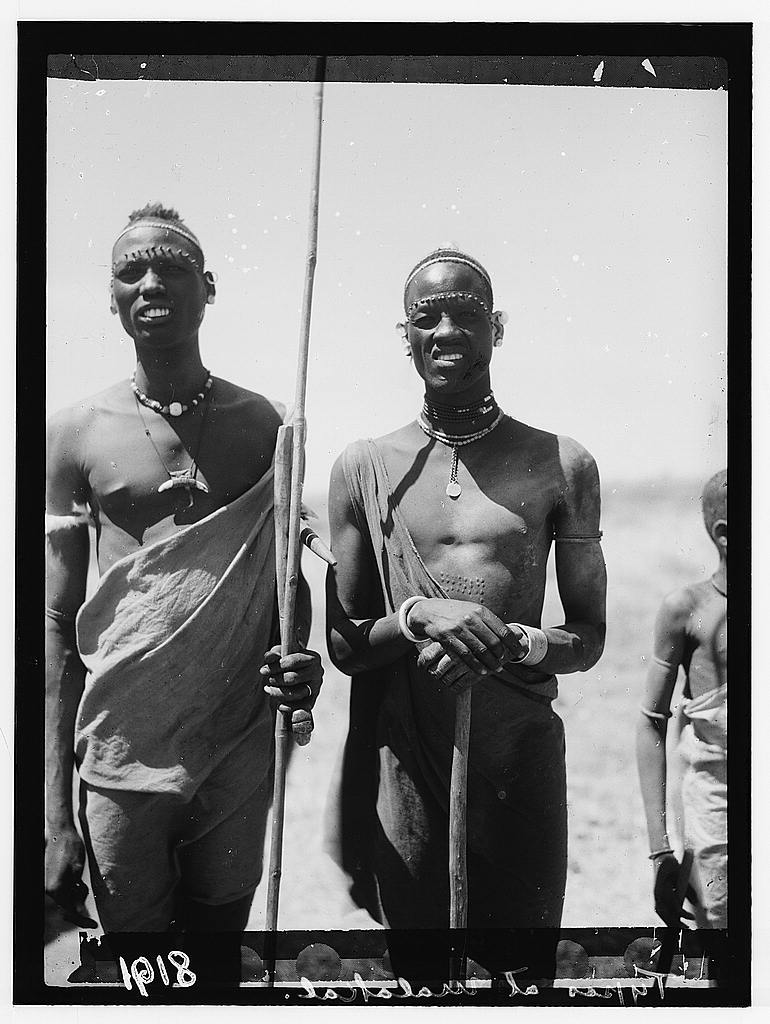
- Two Shilluk men, photographed in 1936 near Malakal, South Sudan

Total population
- 800,000–1,000,300

Languages
- Shilluk, English

Religion
- Christianity; African traditional religion

Related ethnic groups
- Other Luo peoples, other Nilotic peoples

The Shilluk (Note: Shilluk: Cøllø) are a major Luo Nilotic ethnic group that resides in the northeastern Upper Nile state of South Sudan on the western bank of the White Nile River in Upper Nile. The Shilluk people natively speak Dhøg Cøllø and are the third-largest ethnic group of South Sudan, after the Dinka and Nuer.

== History ==
=== Shilluk kingdom ===
The Shilluk people formed today's Shilluk Kingdom in southern Sudan in 1454. Historically, it was a patriarchal monarchy led by a reth from the divine lineage of the culture hero Nyikang, who is believed to affect the nation's health. Their society was once somewhat hierarchical, with castes of royals, nobles, commoners, and enslaved people. Today, the Shilluk government is a democracy, with an elected headman voted in by a council of hamlet heads.

The Shilluk are closely related to the Anuak people and Luo Nilotic members. The Shilluk language shares many words with the Anuak language (the dha anywaa).

Most Shilluk are sedentary agriculturists. Like most Nilotic groups, cattle-raising is a large part of their economy; however, agriculture and fishing are more significant activities than usual. Both sexes engage in agricultural work.

=== Contemporary ===
Before the Second Sudanese Civil War, the Shilluk also lived in settlements on the northern bank of the Sobat River, close to where the Sobat joins the Nile in the defunct Sobat district and in particular Anakdiar district today. The defunct Sobat district was made up of the Current Baliet County and Akoka County, and the indigenous residents of these counties are people of Ngok Lual Yak and Dongjol. Shilluk (Chollol) with their different clans, are residing in Obwa lelo and Anakdiar on the Eastern White Nile banks and around the northern Sobat River confluence with the White Nile along both banks of Sobat River eastward up to Doma North of Sobat and Ashweel South of Sobat River. And also, these chollo people are residence of the some parts of White Nile eastern Bank up to the border of the Sudan in Renk county today.

During the summer of 2010, the Sudan People's Liberation Army (SPLA), in an attempt to disarm the tribe and stop a local Shilluk rebellion, burned several villages and killed an untold number of civilians in South Sudan's Shilluk Kingdom. Over 10,000 people were displaced during the rainy season and sent fleeing into the forest, often naked, without bedding, shelter, or food. Many children died from hunger and cold.

Violence started again in April 2011 with an SPLA crackdown on rebel-controlled regions. The Shilluk and Nuba were the alleged victims.

Violence broke out again in late 2022.

== Culture ==
=== Marriage and family ===
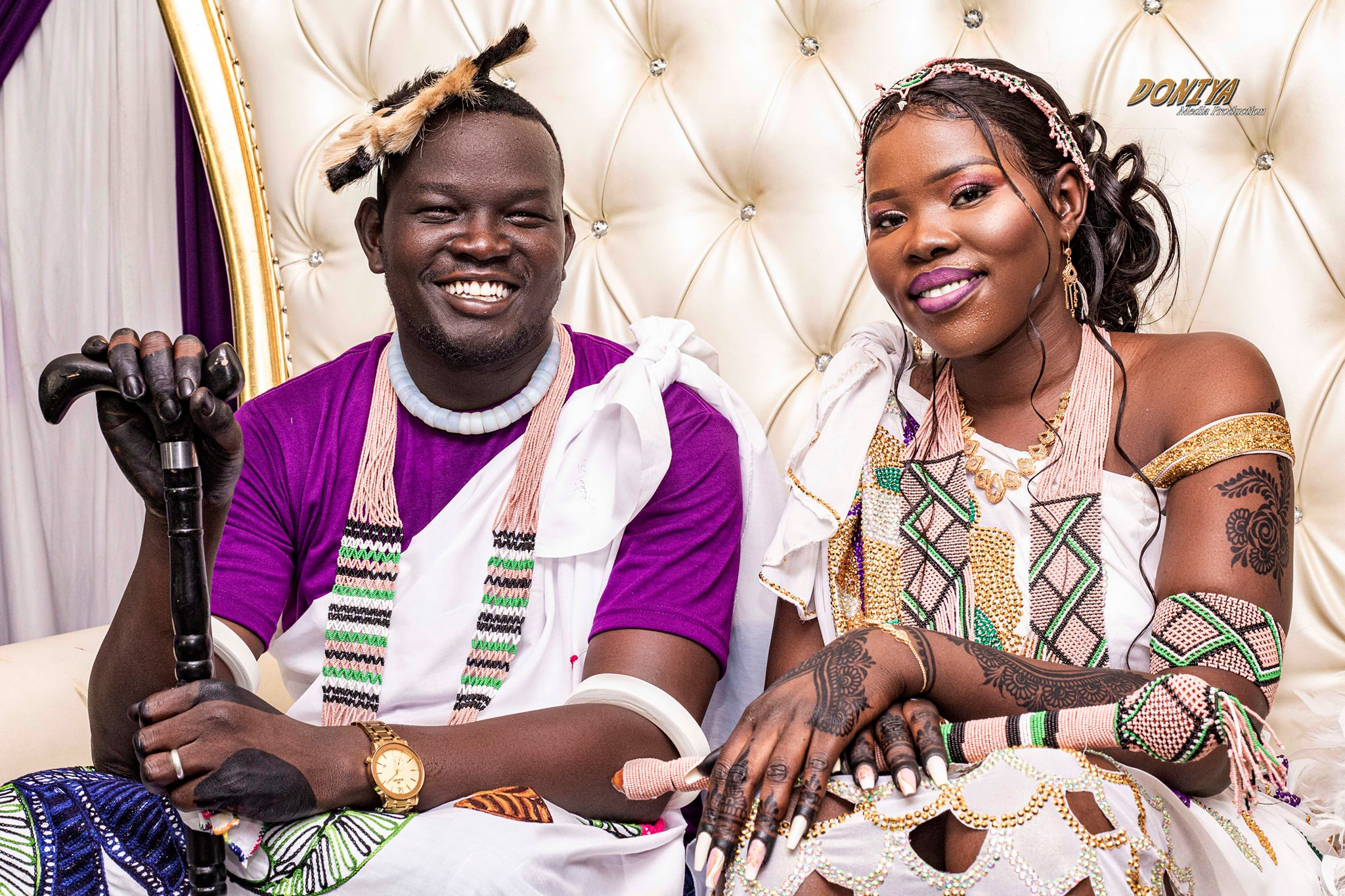
Shilluk Couple during wedding

Among the Shilluk, marriage is a culturally significant institution marked by the transfer of bride-wealth which traditionally included about ten head of cattle, several sheep (diek nom), and symbolic items such as spears (jam nom). While these form the ideal, the amount was negotiable depending on the groom’s means. The process traditionally involves formal ceremonies—cattle exchange, a wedding feast at the bride’s home, a symbolic mock battle between families, and the couple’s relocation to the groom’s family compound. The bride often returns to her natal home to give birth to her first child, affirming lineage ties.

In urban areas like Juba, these customs persist in modified forms. One chief noted that families may accept smaller payments—such as three goats or a modest cash sum—making marriage more accessible to youth. Public celebrations are held in communal spaces, with community contributions reinforcing collective involvement. Despite economic and social shifts, Shilluk marriage continues to emphasize respect, kinship, and cultural continuity.

=== Religion ===
Most Shilluk have converted to Christianity, while some still follow the traditional religion or a mixture of the two; a few have converted to Islam. The Episcopal Church of Sudan dates the event to the late 19th century, when the Church Mission Society first began to send missionaries.

Colonial policies and missionary movements have divided Shilluk into Catholic and Protestant denominations. The Catholic Church historically proselytized on the western bank of the Nile. It ran mission stations at Lul, Detwoc, Tonga, and Yoynyang. In contrast, the American Inland Mission ran a mission station at Doleib Hill, located south of Malakal on the eastern side of the Nile but situated on the Sobat River. The Shilluk were a minority in the Sudan People's Liberation Movement (SPLM) for most of the Second Sudanese Civil War, their number peaking in the late 1980s and the pre-ceasefire fighting in 2004.

=== Physique ===
The Shilluk, along with the Dinka, have been considered some of the tallest people in the world. In an investigation between 1953 and 1954, D. F. Robers reported that Dinka Ruweng males were, on average, 181.3 cm (5 ft 11 1/2 in) tall, while Shilluk males averaged 182.6 cm (6 ft 0 in). General characteristics among the Nilotic people include long legs, narrow bodies, and short trunks, adaptations to South Sudan's hot climate.

However, in 1995, male Shilluk refugees in southwestern Ethiopia were, on average, 172.6 cm (5 ft 8 in) tall. The study suggests that Nilotic people "may attain greater height if privileged with favorable environmental conditions during early childhood and adolescence, allowing full expression of the genetic material." These refugees were displaced due to the Sudanese civil wars in their country from 1955 to the present.

== Language ==
Their language is called Dhøg Cøllø (Shilluk), dhøg being the Shilluk word for language and mouth. It belongs to the Luo branch of the Western Nilotic subfamily of the Nilotic languages.

== Bibliography ==
- Corbett, Greville G. (2000). Numbers. Cambridge, UK; New York: Cambridge University Press. pp. 156–158. ISBN 0-521-64970-6. This section discusses number systems in Dhok-Chollo.
