= Carl Meinhof =

German linguist (1857–1944)

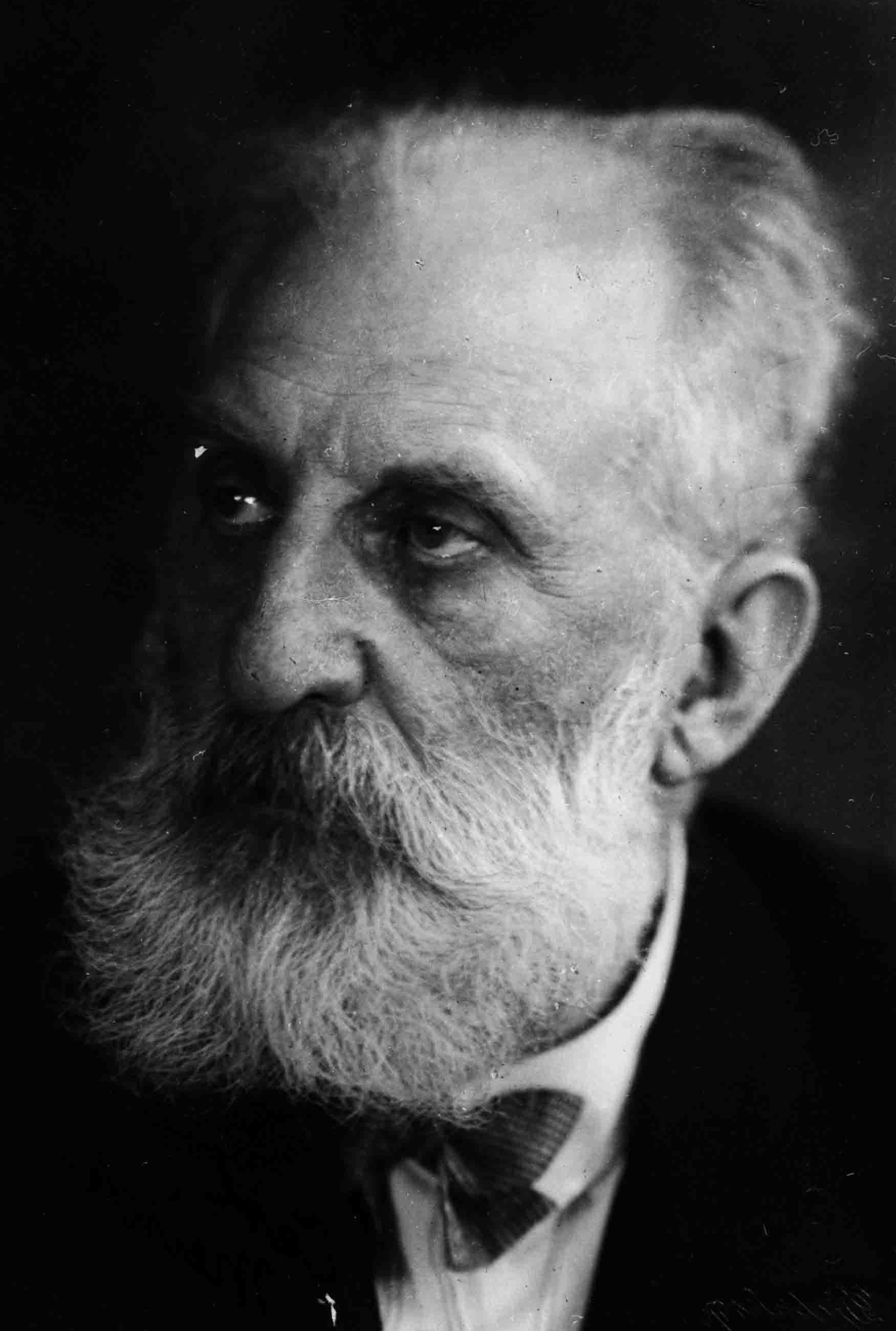
- Born: 23 July 1857; Barzwitz, Province of Pomerania (now Barzowice, Poland)
- Died: 11 February 1944 (aged 86)
- Occupation: Linguist

Carl Friedrich Michael Meinhof (23 July 1857 – 11 February 1944) was a German linguist and one of the first linguists to study African languages.

== Early years and career ==
Meinhof was born in Barzwitz near Rügenwalde in the Province of Pomerania, Kingdom of Prussia. He studied at the University of Tübingen and at the University of Greifswald. In 1905 he became professor at the School of Oriental Studies in Berlin. On 5 May 1933 he became a member of the Nazi Party.

== Works ==
His most notable work was developing comparative grammar studies of the Bantu languages, building on the pioneering work of Wilhelm Bleek. In his work, Meinhof looked at the common Bantu languages such as Swahili and Zulu to determine similarities and differences.

In his work, Meinhof looked at noun classes with all Bantu languages having at least 10 classes and with 22 classes of nouns existing throughout the Bantu languages, though his definition of noun class differs slightly from the accepted one, considering the plural form of a word as belonging to a different class from the singular form (thus leading, for example, to consider a language like French as having four classes instead of two). While no language has all 22 (later: 23) classes active, Venda has 20, Lozi has 18, and Ganda has 16 or 17 (depending on whether the locative class 23 e- is included). All Bantu languages have a noun class specifically for humans (sometimes including other animate beings).

Meinhof also examined other African languages, including groups classified at the time as Kordofanian, Bushman, Khoikhoi, and Hamitic.

Meinhof developed a comprehensive classification scheme for African languages. His classification was the standard one for many years (Greenberg 1955:3). It was replaced by those of Joseph Greenberg in 1955 and in 1963. His ideas influenced the notation of African-language phonetics as advanced in the mid-nineteenth century by the Egyptologist Karl Richard Lepsius and gave rise to what some called the "Meinhof-Lepsius system" of diacritical markers.

In 1902, Meinhof made recordings of East African music. These are among the first recordings made of traditional African music.

== Controversial views ==
In 1912, Carl Meinhof published Die Sprachen der Hamiten ('The Languages of the Hamites'). He used the term Hamitic. Meinhof's system of classification of the Hamitic languages was based on a belief that "speakers of Hamitic became largely coterminous with cattle herding peoples with essentially Caucasian origins, intrinsically different from and superior to the 'Negroes of Africa'." However, in the case of the so-called Nilo-Hamitic languages (a concept he introduced), it was based on the typological feature of gender and a "fallacious theory of language mixture." Meinhof did this in spite of earlier work by scholars such as Lepsius and Johnston demonstrating that the languages which he would later dub "Nilo-Hamitic" were in fact Nilotic languages with numerous similarities in vocabulary with other Nilotic languages.

== Family ==
Carl Meinhof was the great-uncle (the brother of the grandfather) of Ulrike Meinhof, a well known German journalist, who later became a founding member of the Red Army Faction (RAF), a left-wing militant group operating chiefly in West Germany in the 1970s and 1980s.

== See also ==
- Ernst Dammann, Africanist and Nazi, employed by Meinhof
