= Thuri language =

Luo language of South Sudan

Thuri
- Native to: South Sudan
- Native speakers: (6,600 cited 1956)
- Language family: Nilo-Saharan?: Eastern Sudanic?; Kir–Abbaian?; Nilotic; Western; Luo; Northern; Luwo–Thuri; Thuri
- Dialects: Bodho?

Language codes
- ISO 639-3: thu
- Glottolog: thur1255

Thuri (Turi) is a Luo language of South Sudan. The number of speakers is unknown; 6,600 were reported in 1956 (Tucker and Bryan).

Bodho is said to be a dialect, but has also been reported to be closer to Luwo.
