= Kumam dialect =

Southern Luo language

Kumam
- Ikokolemu
- Native to: Uganda
- Region: Kaberamaido District
- Ethnicity: Kumam people
- Native speakers: 270,000 (2014 census)
- Language family: Nilo-Saharan?: Eastern Sudanic; Nilotic; Western Nilotic; Luo; Southern Luo; Lango–Kumam; Kumam

Language codes
- ISO 639-3: kdi
- Glottolog: kuma1275

Kumam is a language of the Southern Lwoo group spoken by the Kumam people of Uganda. It is estimated that the Kumam dialect has 82 percent lexical similarity with the Acholi dialect, and 81 percent with the Lango dialect.

== Phonology ==
=== Consonants ===
		Bilabial	Alveolar	Palatal	Velar
Stop	voiceless	p	t	c	k
Stop	voiced	b	d	ɟ	g
Fricative		(f) (Note: Fricatives occur only in borrowed words.)	(s)		
Lateral			l		
Trill			r		
Nasal		m	n	ɲ	ŋ
Semivowel		w		j	

Gemination can occur due to morphological processes, for example del 'skin' + -ná → dellá 'my skin'.

=== Vowels ===
Kumam has ten vowels, with a vowel harmony system based on presence or absence of advanced tongue root (ATR).

	[-ATR]		[+ATR]	
	Front	Back	Front	Back
Close	ɪ	ʊ	i	u
Mid	ɛ	ɔ	e	o
Open		a		ɑ

Vowels have no distinction in length, except due to some morphological processes, for instance compensatory lengthening that occurs when applying the transitive infinitive suffix -nɔ: ted- 'cook' + -ne → *ted-do → teedo 'to cook'.

=== Tone ===
There exist six tones: low, high, falling, rising, downstep high and double downstep high.

Tone	Transcription
low	[à]
high	[á]
falling	[â]
rising	[ǎ]
downstep high	[!á]
double downstep high	[!!á]

==== Tone sandhi ====
Kumam exhibits tone sandhi in two ways. The first is the spreading of high tonemes rightwards to the following words beginning with a low tonemes, as in ɑbúké 'eyelash' + waŋ 'eye' → abúké wâŋ 'eyelash'. The second is when a floating high toneme is followed by a word beginning in a low toneme, where the floating tone is assigned to the following word and not the word bearing the floating tone: cogó 'bone' + rac 'bad' → cogo râc 'The bone is bad.'

== Grammar ==
=== Verbs ===
==== Valency ====
Transitive stems are constructed by applying the suffix -ɔ (yɛŋ 'be satisfied' → yɛŋ-ɔ 'satisfy'). A subset of transitive verbs can have the suffix -ɛ́rɛ́ applied to form what Hieda calls a 'middle form' (nɛ́n-ɔ → nɛ́!nɛ́rɛ́ 'be seen').

== Basic lexicon ==
Hello – yoga
How are you? –Itiye benyo (singular), Itiyenu benyo (plural)
Fine, and you? – Atiye ber, arai bon yin?
Fine – Atiye ber or just ber
What is your name? – Nying in en Ngai?
My name is ... – Nying ango en ...
Name --- Nying
Nice to see you. --- Apwoyo Neno in (also: Apwoyo Neno wun)
See you again --- Oneno bobo
Book – Itabo
Because – Pi Ento

The first sentence in the bible can be translated as I ya gege, Rubanga ocweo wi polo kede piny ("In the beginning God made the heaven and the earth" ).
