= Alor language =

Alor language may refer to:

- One of the Alor–Pantar languages, a group of non-Austronesian languages
- Alorese, an Austronesian language spoken on Alor Island

== See also ==
- Alur language, a Nilotic language of Uganda and the DRC
