= Ghost marriage in South Sudan =

Cultural practice

In South Sudan, a ghost marriage is a marriage where a deceased groom is replaced by his brother. The brother serves as a stand in to the bride, and any resulting children are considered children of the deceased spouse. This unusual type of marriage is nearly exclusive to the Dinka (Jieng), Nuer, and Atuot people of South Sudan although instances of such marriages have also occurred in France. These tribes overlap in cultural practices, potentially because all of these tribes are cattle-herding pastoralists.

== Nuer people ==
Nuer women do not marry deceased men only to continue the man's bloodline. In accordance with Nuer tradition, any wealth owned by the woman becomes property of the man after the marriage. This wealth that is transferred is in the form of cattle, being exchanged from the father's lineage to the mother's lineage. Once this exchange is completed, the male children of that woman who received the cattle can now marry.

Thus, a wealthy woman may marry a deceased man to retain her wealth, instead of giving it up after marrying. Among the Nuer, a ghost marriage is nearly as common as a marriage to a live man.

== Atuot people ==
There was a decline in ghost marriage among the Atuot people in the 1970s, and some sources attributed it to a connection with the cattle trade.

== See also ==
- Ghost marriage (Chinese)
- Levirate marriage
- Posthumous marriage
