= Nuer =

Nuer may refer to:

- Nuer people
- Nuer language or Thok Nath
