= Southern Luo languages =

Luo (also spelt LWO) dialect cluster spoken in Central Africa

Southern Luo (Lwo)
- Southern Lwoo
- Region: South Sudan, Uganda, Kenya, Tanzania and the DRC
- Ethnicity: Luo peoples, Ateker peoples
- Native speakers: (8.8 million cited 2001–2009)
- Language family: Nilo-Saharan?: Eastern Sudanic?; Southern Eastern?; Nilotic; Western; Luo; Southern Luo (Lwo)
- Early form: Proto-Southern Luo
- Dialects: Acholi; Adhola–Alur–Luo; Kumam–Lango

Language codes
- ISO 639-2: luo
- ISO 639-3: Variously: adh – Adhola kdi – Kumam luo – Dholuo alz – Alur laj – Lango ach – Acholi
- Glottolog: sout2831

The Southern Luo languages are a subgroup of the Luo languages and form a dialect cluster spoken from Uganda and neighboring countries.

== Classification ==
The Southern Luo dialects are classified within the Glottolog database as follows:

- Southern Lwoo
  - Acholi
  - Adhola–Alur–Luo
    - Adhola–Luo
      - Adhola
      - Luo (Kenya and Tanzania)
    - Alur
  - Lango–Kumam
    - Kumam
    - Lango (Uganda)
