= Burun =

Burun may refer to:

- Burun people, of Sudan
- Burun language, spoken by the Burun people
- Burun, Iran, a village in Zanjan Province, Iran
