= Georg Jacob =

German orientalist and arabist (1862–1937)

Georg Jacob (26 May 1862 – 4 July 1937) was a scholar of Islamic studies and an Orientalist. He founded Turkology as a modern academic discipline in Germany.

== Life ==
Jacob studied Arabic geography at the Universität Greifswald, achieving his Habilitation in 1892. In 1896 he became an Extraordinary Professor at the Friedrich-Alexander-Universität in Erlangen, and in 1888-90 he was assistant librarian at the Royal Library in Berlin. In 1911 he was made Chair of Oriental Studies at the Christian-Albrechts-Universität in Kiel, succeeding Georg Hoffmann (orientalist). As (ordinarius) for 'Semitic and Islamic Philology' at the university, Jacob was the first German professor to have a chair incorporating Islamic studies, reflecting a tentative institutional willingness to allow the field of Semitic language study to expand to include the Islamic world, including the non-Semitic, Turkic-speaking world. In Kiel, Jacob 'was director of the Oriental institute at the university [...], which consisted of one room serving as his office, as classroom and as library. Luckily the room had a high ceiling, thus ample wall space was available for the book shelves'. 1922–23 saw him serving as Rector of the university, and he was the honorand of a Festschrift in 1932.

Though beginning with research on Arabic history and literature, Jacob turned his attention progressively towards Persian and Turkish studies, especially the latter. His work was characterised by its wide-ranging, internationalist outlook, and 'the customs and institutions of the common people'.

In 1892, Jacob attended a shadow puppet performance in Istanbul. That experience led him to a lifetime fascination with, and scholarly research into, the subject of shadow play. Jacob was rare in the German academy of his day for specialising in Ottoman-Turkish studies, and was the first translator and editor of modern Turkish literature in the German-speaking world, founding the Türkische Bibliothek series published by Mayer & Müller in Berlin.

== Major works ==
- Das Leben der vorislâmischen Beduinen. (Studien in arabischen Dichtern, Heft III) Mayer & Müller, Berlin 1895
- Das türkische Schattentheater. Berlin, 1900
- Die Geschichte des Schattentheaters im Morgen- und Abendland. 1. Auflage 1907, 2., erweiterte Auflage 1925 (1972), ISBN 978-3764804114
- Arabische Berichte von Gesandten an germanische Fürstenhöfe aus dem 9. und 10. Jahrhundert. Ins Deutsche übertragen und mit Fussnoten versehen von Georg Jacob. Berlin 1927.

== Biographical sources ==
- Ernst Dammann: "Erinnerungen an Georg Jacob (1862–1937)." In: Klaus Kreiser (ed.): Germano-Turcica. Zur Geschichte des Türkisch-Lernens in den deutschsprachigen Ländern, Universitätsbibliothek Bamberg, Bamberg 1987, ISBN 3-923507-06-2, pp. 113–118.
- Norbert Diekmann: Georg Jacob und seine Bedeutung für die Entwicklung der Orientalistik vom 19. zum 20. Jahrhundert. In: XXX. Deutscher Orientalistentag, Freiburg, 24–28 September 2007. Ausgewählte Vorträge. Ed. in association with the DMG by Rainer Brunner, Jens Peter Laut and Maurus Reinkowski, February 2009 (PDF).
- Klaus Kreiser: Bektaşî-Miszellen (including: 2. Georg Jacob <1862–1937> als Begründer der Bektaşî-Studien). In: Turcica. Revue d'études turques. vols. 21–23, 1991, pp. 115–130; repr. in: Istanbul und das Osmanische Reich. Derwischwesen, Baugeschichte, Inschriftenkunde (=Analecta Isisiana 14). Isis, Istanbul 1995, pp. 243–256.
- Klaus Kreiser: "Jacob, Georg (1862–1937). Alman şarkiyatçısı ve Türkologu." In: Türkiye Diyanet Vakfı İslâm Ansiklopedisi, vol. 23, Istanbul 2001, pp. 567–568 (online).
- Enno Littmann: "Georg Jacob (1862–1937)." In: Zeitschrift der Deutschen Morgenländischen Gesellschaft. vol. 91 (n.F. 16), Nr. 2/3, 1937, pp. 486–500.
