= Lango language (Uganda) =

Luo language of Uganda

Lango
- Lëblaŋo
- Native to: Uganda
- Region: Lango sub-region
- Ethnicity: Lango
- Native speakers: 2.1 million (2014 census)
- Language family: Nilo-Saharan?: Eastern Sudanic; Nilotic; Western Nilotic; Luo; Southern Luo; Lango-Kumam; Lango
- Writing system: Latin

Language codes
- ISO 639-3: laj
- Glottolog: lang1324
- Glottopedia: Lango

Lango is a Nilotic language spoken in the Lango sub-region of Northern Uganda.

The origin of Lango people is strongly linked to the Karamojong and Teso speaking people.

== Phonology ==
=== Consonants ===
		Bilabial	Alveolar	Palatal	Velar	Glottal
Stop	voiceless	p	t		k	(ʔ)
Stop	voiced	b	d		g	
Affricate	voiceless			tɕ		
Affricate	voiced			dʑ		
Fricative		(ɸ)	(s)	(ɕ)	(x)	
Lateral			l			
Tap	voiceless		(ɾ̥)			
Tap	voiced		ɾ			
Nasal		m	n	ɲ	ŋ	
Semivowel		w		j		

In addition to these consonants, the Lango language maintains a gemination [Cː] distinction in the stops, affricates, nasals and lateral.

Voiceless stops and affricates are slightly aspirated, whereas voiced stops and affricates are fully voiced, sometimes with a characteristic of breathy voice. Stops are normally unreleased at the end of an utterance.

Fricatives and the voiceless alveolar tap are found in complementary distribution with ungeminated voiceless stops and affricates:

- [p] alternates with [ɸ]
- [t] alternates with [ɾ̥]
- [tɕ] alternates with [s] and [ɕ]
- [k] alternates with [x]

A glottal stop [ʔ] can also be heard in word-initial position, or in other intervocalic positions. In slow speech, it may also be heard as a murmured fricative [ɦ].

=== Vowels ===
Kumam has ten vowels, forming an asymmetric vowel harmony system based on advanced and retracted tongue root, wherein the presence of advanced tongue root vowels [+ATR] may change retracted tongue root vowels [-ATR], but the reverse does not hold. Vowels can be lengthened but in a predictable manner.

	[+ATR]			[-ATR]		
	Front	Central	Back	Front	Central	Back
Close	i		u	ɪ		ʊ
Mid	e	ə	o	ɛ		ɔ
Open					a	

== Writing system ==
Lango alphabet
a	b	c	d	e	ë	g	i	ï	j	k	l	m	n	ŋ	ny	o	ö	p	r	t	u	ü	w	y

Long vowels are indicated by doubling the vowel: ⟨aa, ee, ëë, ii, ïï, oo, öö, uu, üü⟩.
