= Burun language =

Nilotic language of South Sudan

Burun
- Lange
- Native to: South Sudan
- Region: Upper Nile State
- Ethnicity: Burun
- Native speakers: 50,000 (2022)
- Language family: Nilo-Saharan?: Eastern Sudanic; Southern Eastern; Nilotic; Western; Luo; Northern; Mabaan–Burun; Burun languages; Burun
- Dialects: Maiak; Mughaja; Kurmuk
- Writing system: Arabic; Latin

Language codes
- ISO 639-3: bdi
- Glottolog: buru1301

Northern Burun is a Nilotic language of South Sudan. Blench (2012) lists the three varieties separately.
