= Belanda Bor language =

Luo language of South Sudan

Bor
- Belanda Bor
- Native to: South Sudan
- Native speakers: 26,000 (2017)
- Language family: Nilo-Saharan?: Eastern Sudanic?; Kir–Abbaian?; Nilotic; Western; Luo; Northern; Bor

Language codes
- ISO 639-3: bxb
- Glottolog: bela1256
- ELP: Belanda Bor
- Belanda Bor is classified as Definitely Endangered by the UNESCO Atlas of the World's Languages in Danger.

Belanda Bor, or Bor, is a Luo language of South Sudan. Most speakers also use Belanda Viri, which is an unrelated Ubangian language.

Obtaining scientific/linguistic information about the Belanda language posed more challenges than expected. There were many gaps in the history of the language, and many contradictions were encountered.

The history of the Belanda Boor ethnic group lacks coherence, likely due to conflicts, slave raids, and civil wars affecting the region. Most of the Belanda Boor people were forced to leave their homelands and settle in Western Equatoria. Another possible reason for the lack of proper history is the independence of South Sudan, which led to more contradictions and a lack of proper recordings about the Belanda Boor people.

There are currently between 40,000 and 50,000 speakers of the language in South Sudan.

== Etymology ==
The term Belanda Boor is used to denote both the language and the people. To distinguish between both meanings, a prefix is added:

Joo-boor – the community

Di-boor – the language.

Belanda Boor is formed from the autonym Boor and the central-Sudanic Bongo word Beerlanda. In Bongo, beer is the ethnonym for all their Lwoo speaking neighbours. The word landa means hills and mountains.

== Classification ==
Belanda Boor belongs to the Nilo-Saharan group, further classified as Nilotic, western Nilotic, and northern Lawoo.

== Phonology ==
=== Syllable structure ===
Like many western Nilotic languages, the syllabic structure of Boor is monosyllabic. Also typical for the Belanda Boor language is that most of the nouns have no affixes in the singular form and in the plural, they maintain prefixes. The syllables in the Belanda Boor languages are either open or closed. Open syllables can be high or heavy.

=== Consonants ===
Belanda Boor has 35 consonant phonemes. There is a vast difference between typical Lwoo consonants systems. They exist as fricatives and labiovelars.

		Bilabial	Labiodental	Dental	Alveolar	Palatal	Velar	Labiovelar
Stops	Voiced	b		d̪	d	ɟ	ɡ	ɡʷ ɡb
Stops	Unvoiced	p		t̪	t	c	k	kʷ kp
Stops	Prenasalised	ᵐb			ⁿd	ᶮɟ	ᵑɡ	ᵑɡʷ ᵑɡb
Nasals		m			n	ɲ	ŋ	ŋʷ
Fricatives			f		s			
Liquids	Lateral				l	ʎ	ʟ	ʟʷ
Liquids	Trill				r			
Glides		w				j		

=== Vowels ===
Many of the Lwoo languages have the vowel system of the five ATR+ and ATR- vowels.

Belanda Boor has two phonologically categorised sets of vowels. These vowels are distinguished by the position of the tongue root as either of ATR+ or ART- quality. The vowel inventory of Boor reflects an ATR system.

A significant difference between the Boor and other languages is that Belanda Boor is not prone to vowel harmony, even if there are traces.

== Nouns ==
Belanda Boor nouns are defined morphosyntactically as they comprise only the categories of words which can be marked based on numbers. The gender of nouns can also be linked to the gender marking prefixes. In the Belanda Boor language, the agent is always the subject of the clause, their roles are syntactically realised when used with the object of a verb or the object of a preposition.

The word order of Belanda Boor is SVO. The role of the word classes is determined according to their position in the order. It is also possible to identify nouns according to their semantic behaviours. Belanda Boor distinguishes a large number of semantic categories for nouns. Nouns typically refer to concepts which are time-stable.

Types of Nouns

The Nouns of the language Belanda Boor exhibit a rather wide range of canonical forms in various tone patterns. Tone is reduced in Belanda Boor, so it does not have any grammatical function. All the minimal pairs of the lexicon differ in vowel length and quality, but not in tone.

The majority of the Basic Nouns in Belanda Boor are of the CV(V) pattern and only few of them exhibit the shape CV (V).

In Belanda Boor, there are various types and nouns which only consist of the pure stem. Complex nouns exhibit a stem and up to their prefixed morphemes. Only a derivational prefix or a classifier can be attached at a time, but never both.

(1) morphological structures

(1a) structures including a derivational prefix

Number marker+ derivational prefix+ petrified sex+ stem+ petrified suffix

(1b) Structures including a classifier

Classifier+ number marker+ petrified sex+ stem+ petrified suffix

== Verbs ==
Belanda Boor follows the typical CVC structure for the verb roots, similar to the roots of basic nouns. Verbs in Belanda Boor usually denote actions, but there are some exceptions like stative verbs.

The syntactic position of verbs is either SVO or SV. Although there are exceptions, the verb always follows the subject. Another way to identify verbs is according to their morphosyllabic behaviour. In this case, verbs can be marked for grammatical categories like TAM-tense, aspect and mood and person.

Structure of Verbs

Here are some examples for the CVC structure in Belanda Boor by Beatrix von Heyking.

CVC

High- Tone kwác 'to beg'

Mid-Tone cãm 'to eat'

Low-Tone màd̪ 'to drink'

In Belanda Boor, there are verbs which lack the final consonant and are thus of CV or CVV structure

Some examples

CV (V)

Mid tone mbū 'be tired'

Low tone mbù 'leave sth'

Mid tone wīī 'allow sth'

The first two examples can be traced to be loans from Ubanga, which probably entered Boor via Belanda Bviri.

Another pattern for verbs is CVCV. The final vowel does not belong to the verb stem.

HHH méd médɔ́ 'to dance'

MM cãm cãm ‚to eat'

LL lèg lèk 'to dream'

Summarising Tam

Here is an overview of all the inventory markers for tense/ aspects and moods

Tense

Present perfective: ni

Past perfective: a-

Future perfective: uku

Present imperfective: na

Past imperfective: (ɲiki) na

Aspects

Completive: ɲika

Incompletive: ɲiki

Habitual: u-

Completive habitual: dɛka

Incompletive habitual: dɛki

Negative habitual: kʊ

Final: yɔkɔ

Mood

Evidential: kɪ

Imperative: (syntactical means)

Negative imperative: ni

Hortative: (syntactical means)
