= Jur language =

Language spoken by the Luo people of South Sudan's Bahr El Ghazal region

Luwo
- Jur
- Native to: South Sudan
- Region: Bahr el Ghazal
- Ethnicity: Luwo people
- Native speakers: 260,000 (2017)
- Language family: Nilo-Saharan?: Eastern Sudanic?; Southern Eastern; Nilotic; Western; Luo; Northern; Luwo

Language codes
- ISO 639-3: lwo
- Glottolog: luwo1239

Luwo (Luo, Dheluwo), is a language spoken by the Luo people of Bahr el Ghazal region in South Sudan. The language is predominantly spoken in the western and northern parts of Bahr el Ghazal. The Luwo form a majority in the Jur River County.

The language is part of the Luo languages of East Africa and is especially related to the languages of South Sudan such as Anyuak and Päri with whom it forms a dialect cluster.

== Etymology ==
The Luwo language is spoken by the Luwo (or Jur Col), an ethnic group in South Sudan. Jur is exonym adopted from the local Dinka language whose speakers are the Luwo's northern and eastern neighbours. Its original Dinka usage, non-cattle-holding non-Dinka, was not particular to the Jur. Jur Col ("black Jur") is today used to disambiguate Luwo from other Jur groups.

== Status ==
Dhe Luwo is currently a developing language. Meaning that the language is developing its written language, standard dialect and undergoing modernization.

== Phonology ==
=== Consonants ===
		Labial	Dental	Alveolar	Palatal	Velar	Glottal
Nasal		m	n̪	n	ɲ	ŋ	
Plosive	voiceless	p	t̪	t	c	k	ʔ
Plosive	voiced	b	d̪	d	ɟ	g	
Trill				r			
Lateral				l			
Approximant		w			j		

- /k/ can sometimes be heard as [ɣ] in intervocalic position.
- /ŋ/ can sometimes be heard as [h] in intervocalic position among speakers of the eastern dialects.
- /r/ can be heard as a tap [ɾ] in word-final position.
- All consonant sounds except the voiced stops /b, d̪, d, ɟ, ɡ/ and the two glides /w, j/ can occur as geminated [Cː].
- Labialization [Cʷ] may occur among all consonants except /d̪, ɟ, n̪, n, r, w, j/.
- Palatalization [Cʲ] may occur among consonants /t, c, d̪, ɡ, m, l/.

=== Vowels ===
Oral vowels
	+ATR			-ATR		
	Front	Central	Back	Front	Central	Back
Close	i iː		u uː	ɪ ɪː		ʊ ʊː
Mid	e eː	ʌ̈ ʌ̈ː	o oː	ɛ ɛː		ɔ ɔː
Open					a aː	

Breathy vowels
	+ATR			-ATR		
	Front	Central	Back	Front	Central	Back
Close	i̤ i̤ː		ṳ ṳː	ɪ̤ ɪ̤ː		ʊ̤ ʊ̤ː
Mid	e̤ e̤ː	ʌ̤̈ ʌ̤̈ː	o̤ o̤ː	ɛ̤ ɛ̤ː		ɔ̤ ɔ̤ː
Open					a̤ a̤ː	

== Sample phrases ==
English	Luwo
Hello (How are you?)	Mahdhia (Ni dih)?
I am fine (nothing bad)	Gihn me raaj tooro.
What is your name?	Nyingi nga'a?
My name is Dimo.	Nyinga Dimo.
Child	Nyithiin
Boy	Nyidhohg
Girl	Nyakuo
God is great.	Juag Duohng.
Good	Ber
Thank you!	Kori!
I am happy.	Ciwnya med.
