= Detwoc =

Detwoc is a Shilluk village in the state of Upper Nile in South Sudan, and is situated on the western bank of the Nile river, 16 kilometres (10 mi) from the town of Kodok, which is approximately two hours by boat north of the state capital Malakal.

The Catholic Church established a mission station in Detwok in 1923, its third in the region after Lul and Tonga. A fourth mission was subsequently established in Yoynyang. The missions were originally managed by the Comboni Missionaries of the Heart of Jesus, a Catholic Missionary Order established by Daniel Comboni. Immediately prior to World War II, the Detwok mission was taken over by Mill Hill fathers. The mission station was a fairly typical one, and included a school, health centre and church. The station was abandoned by the church in the early 1980s because of the Second Sudanese Civil War, but began to be re-developed after the end of that conflict in 2005.
