= Barzowice =

- Village
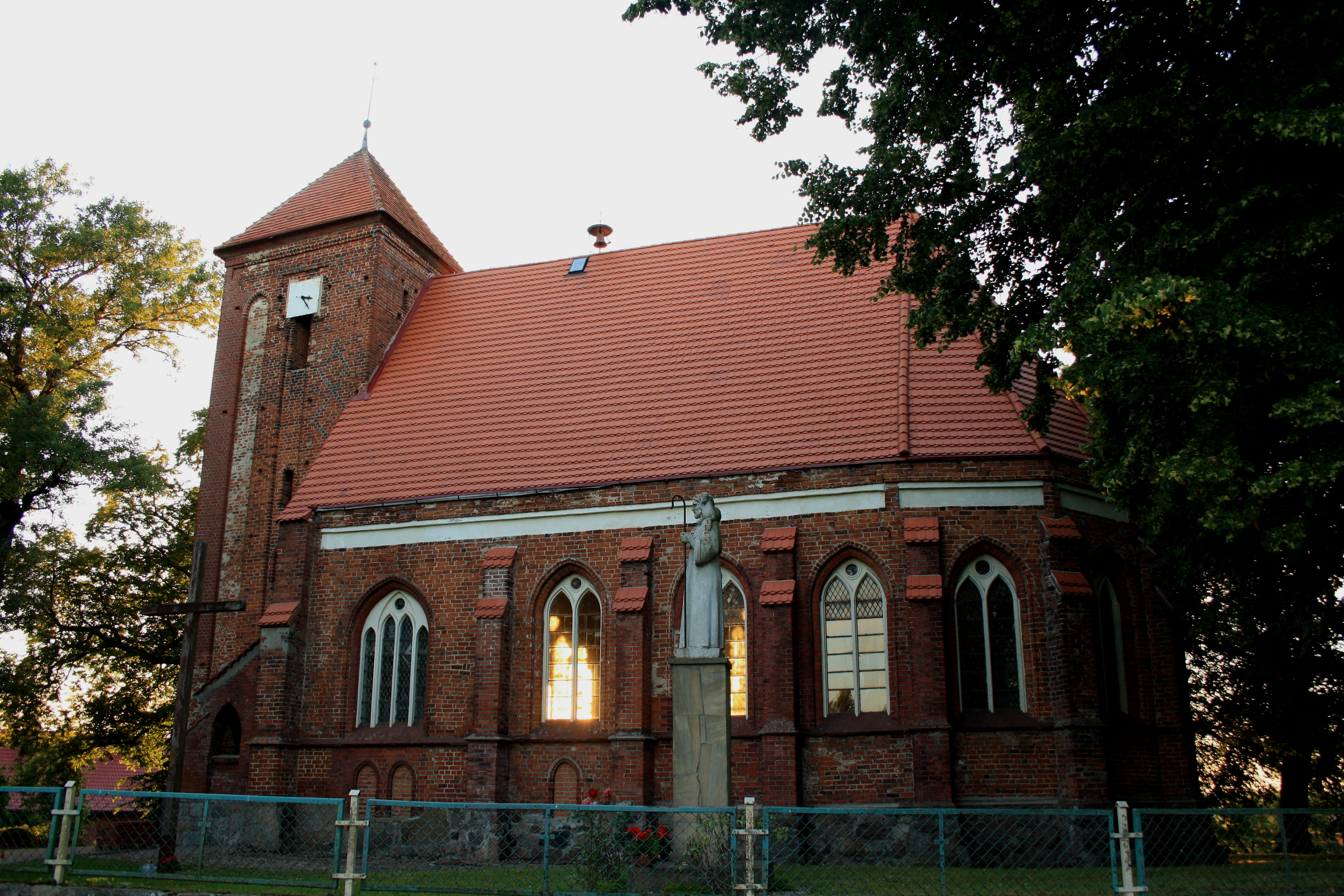
- Church of Saint Francis

- Location within Poland
- Coordinates: 54°28′50″N 16°30′27″E
- Country: Poland
- Voivodeship: West Pomeranian
- County: Sławno
- Gmina: Darłowo

Population
  - Total: 278

Barzowice [barzɔˈvit͡sɛ] (German: Barzwitz) is a village in the administrative district of Gmina Darłowo, within Sławno County, West Pomeranian Voivodeship, in north-western Poland. It lies approximately 10 km (6 mi) north-east of Darłowo, 18 km (11 mi) north-west of Sławno, and 173 km (107 mi) north-east of the regional capital Szczecin.

For the history of the region, see History of Pomerania.

The village has a population of 278.

== Notable residents ==
- Carl Meinhof (1857–1944), linguist
