= Paranilotic languages =

Proposed language family

Paranilotic is a group of languages proposed by Carl Meinhof. Karl Lepsius had established the Nilotic languages as a family, with Western, Eastern, and Southern branches. Meinhof proposed that only Western were truly Nilotic, and that Eastern and Southern, which he called Nilo-Hamitic, were a mixture of (Western) Nilotic and Hamitic languages (in particular, modern Cushitic), based on racial and other non-linguistic considerations. Joseph Greenberg reverted to Lepsius's classification, as part of an attempt to remove racial classifications from African linguistics. However, Tucker and Bryan's (1956, 1966) influential surveys resurrected Meinhof's proposal under the name Paranilotic, and that name is still sometimes found, especially in non-linguistic works. Modern linguistics has discarded the concept of Paranilotic, seeing Nilotic more or less as Lepsius had, with three distinct branches.
