= Burun languages =

Branch of the Western Nilotic languages

Burun
- Geographic distribution: South Sudan, Sudan
- Linguistic classification: Nilo-Saharan?: Eastern Sudanic?; Southern Eastern?; Nilotic; Western Nilotic; Burun
- Subdivisions: North Burun; South Burun

Language codes
- Glottolog: buru1328 (Burun)

The Burun languages are a branch of the Western Nilotic languages. They include:

- North Burun (Maiak, Kurmuk, Burun proper)
- South Burun (Mabaan, Ulu, Jumjum)

The languages were first described by Edward E. Evans-Pritchard in 1932. They are a dialect chain, close enough for some mutual intelligibility between neighboring varieties.

Most classifications include the family within the Western Nilotic branch, these include Starostin (2015), Hammarström et al. (2016) and Bender (2000). Blench (2012) classifies the family as a primary branch of Nilotic.
