= Burun people =

Ethnic group of South Sudan

Burun People
Burun

Total population
- 54,000

Regions with significant populations
- South Sudan

Languages
- Burun language

Religion
- Islam, Ethnic religions

The Burun are a Luo Nilotic ethnic group from South Sudan. They live in and around the Upper Nile Valley in the eastern part of Upper Nile State. They speak Burun, a Luo Nilotic language. This ethnic group numbers about 54,000 people. According to 2008 Sudan population census the Burun were counted at 8,000 persons. Burun people inhabited the areas present of Dajo, Pacime, Waldese and Kigile in Upper Nile State.
