= Päri language =

Luo language spoken in South Sudan

Päri
- Native to: South Sudan
- Region: Upper Nile State
- Ethnicity: Pari
- Native speakers: 79,000 (2017)
- Language family: Nilo-Saharan?: Eastern Sudanic?; Kir–Abbaian?; Nilotic; Western; Luo; Northern; Päri

Language codes
- ISO 639-3: lkr
- Glottolog: pari1256

Päri is a Luo language of South Sudan. Päri has been claimed to have ergative alignment, which is rare-to-nonexistent in African languages, although recent descriptions of the language have instead described the case system as marked nominative (nominative–absolutive).
