= Distributive pronoun =

Type of pronoun

A distributive pronoun considers members of a group separately, rather than collectively.

They include either, neither and others.

- "to each his own" — 'each2,(pronoun)' Merriam-Webster's Online Dictionary (2007)
- "Men take each other's measure when they react." — Ralph Waldo Emerson

Besides distributive pronouns, there are also distributive determiners (also called distributive adjectives). The pronouns and determiners often have the same form:

- Each went his own way (each used as a pronoun, without an accompanying noun)
- Each man went his own way (each used as a determiner, accompanying the noun man)
- Each of the answers is correct (each used as a pronoun, with an accompanying prepositional phrase of the answers)

== Languages other than English ==
=== Biblical Hebrew ===
A common distributive idiom in Biblical Hebrew used an ordinary word for man, 'ish (איש). Brown Driver Briggs only provides four representative examples—Gn 9:5; 10:5; 40:5; Ex 12:3. Of the many other examples of the idiom in the Hebrew Bible, the best known is a common phrase used to describe everyone returning to their own homes. It is found in 1 Samuel 10:25 among other places.

- איש לביתו
- ... 'ish l'beyto.
- ... a man to his house. [literal]
- ... each went home. [sense]

This word, 'ish, was often used to distinguish men from women. "She shall be called Woman (אשה) because she was taken out of Man (איש)," is well known, but the distinction is also clear in Gn 19:8; 24:16 and 38:25 (see note for further references). However, it could also be used generically in this distributive idiom (Jb 42:11; I Ch 16:3).

=== Greek ===
The most common distributive pronoun in classical Greek was hekastos (ἕκαστος, each).

== See also ==
- Adjective
- Pronoun
- Quantification
