= Dinka–Nuer languages =

Dinka–Nuer
- Geographic distribution: South Sudan, Ethiopia
- Linguistic classification: Nilo-Saharan?: Eastern Sudanic; Southern Eastern; Nilotic; Western Nilotic; Dinka–Nuer
- Proto-language: Proto-Dinka-Nuer
- Subdivisions: Dinka; Nuer-Reel

Language codes
- Glottolog: dink1261

The Dinka–Nuer languages are a branch of the Western Nilotic languages spoken in South Sudan and Ethiopia.

== History ==
Christopher Ehret dates Proto-Dinka–Nuer to ca. 500 BCE and positions it near the confluence of the Bahr el Ghazal and the Bahr al Jabal rivers, where they form the White Nile.
