= Ernst Dammann =

German Africanist

Ernst Karl Alwin Hans Dammann
- Born: 6 May 1904; Pinneberg, Holstein, German Empire
- Died: 12 July 2003 (aged 99); Pinneberg, Holstein, Germany
- Political party: National Socialist German Workers' Party (c. 1931–1945)

Academic background
- Education: University of Kiel
- Theses: Das negerische Afrika bei Yaqut und Qazwini (Ph.D.) (1929); Dichtungen in der Lamu-Mundart des Suaheli (Habilitation) (1939)
- Academic advisor: Carl Meinhof

Academic work
- Discipline: African languages
- Institutions: Baltic University; Kirchliche Hochschule Hamburg; Humboldt University of Berlin; University of Marburg

Ernst Karl Alwin Hans Dammann (6 May 1904 in Pinneberg, Holstein – 12 July 2003 in Pinneberg) was a German Africanist. With Walter Markov, he was one of the founders of African Studies in the DDR, and as a student of Carl Meinhof and the successor of Diedrich Hermann Westermann, was part of the "second wave" of German Africanists. A prodigious scholar of African languages and a one-time missionary in Tanga, Tanzania, he was an early member of the Nazi party, and his scientific work was criticized as imbued with racist ideology.

== Biography ==
=== Education, NSDAP membership ===
Dammann grew up in Schleswig-Holstein, in an atmosphere of "Evangelical-Lutheran piety and Prussian virtues". His mother died young (in 1916), and his father left for Africa in 1908, where he spent three years working on Tanganyika Railway in Tanzania. He attended the Gymnasium Christianeum in Hamburg, and then studied in Kiel and at the University of Hamburg, with Carl Meinhof, whom he had met earlier in Pinneberg, before going to Berlin. During this period he also had an appointment as Lehrbeauftragter in Hebrew at the University of Kiel. He gained his doctorate in Kiel in 1929 (dissertation: Das negerische Afrika bei Yaqut und Qazwini) and was ordained in 1930. That same year he was employed as a research assistant by Meinhof in Hamburg. According to Ernst Klee, he joined the Nazi Party in 1931; other sources have him join on 1 August 1933, with membership number 609,464. Meinhof and many others (including Dammann, Bernhard Struck, August Klingenheben, and Ernst Zyhlarz) were Nazis or Nazi sympathizers whose views on race were steeped in 19th-century theories of European racial superiority, with the attendant idea that the alleged African inferiority was manifested also in literature and language.

=== In and out of Africa ===
From 1933 to 1937 he was a missionary in Tanga, Tanzania, working for a German settler community. He visited Lamu Island, where (with the help of his wife, Ruth) he collected the verse of the Swahili poet Zahidi Mngumi; his was said to be "the most complete collection" of Mngumi's poetry. Dammann was the leader of the foreign branch of the Nazi party (Landesgruppenleiter). In this position "he discredited himself" in conflict with the Bethel Mission, German East Africa, and he was removed from the mission.

==== Paradox between Nazi ideology and contribution to Swahili studies ====
Dammann's research trips to the Lamu Archipelago in the 1930s created a historical paradox. By assembling a vast corpus of Swahili manuscripts in the Kiamu dialect, his work contributed to the global dissemination and recognition of Swahili literary culture. Ironically, while Dammann’s own racial ideology ranked African intellectual productions at the bottom of a racial hierarchy, the linguistic data he preserved later served to demonstrate the existence of a sophisticated Swahili civilization with high literary, philosophical, and theological standards.

=== Subsequent career in Germany (DDR and BRD) ===
After his return from Africa, he achieved his habilitation in African languages from the University of Hamburg in 1939, (thesis: Dichtungen in der Lamu-Mundart des Suaheli) where he was teaching by 1940. During World War II he served in the army in Denmark and then Tunisia, where he was captured by US forces. From 1943 to 1946 he was a prisoner of war at Fort Sam Houston in the United States; he was active as a parson. From 1946 to 1948 he was first a teacher, then the principal administrator at the school of theology for German prisoners of war at Norton Manor Camp in England. In 1949 he was teaching missiology at the Baltic University, then became professor at the Kirchliche Hochschule Hamburg.

In 1957 he was appointed as chair of African Languages and Cultures at the Humboldt University of Berlin, as the successor of Diedrich Hermann Westermann. His application was supported by Klingenheben and Westermann. A memo, likely from some state agency, outlines the need for African Studies in East Germany: teaching African languages would be of great benefit in any East German ventures on the African continent. Dammann's linguistic expertise was said to override his compromised past; his "conservative" politics were well-known, but apparently he was silent about his position as Landesgruppenleiter for the NSDAP/AO in Africa, and copped only to having temporarily filled a vacancy. With Walter Markov, who had set up an anti-Nazi communist cell and had been imprisoned for most of the Hitler era, he became one of the founding fathers of African Studies in East Germany. His colleagues in Berlin were well aware of his Nazi past and denounced him; one of them, in reporting him to the university's SED leader, noted Dammann was "glorifying the colonial politics of the imperialists ... and of German fascism". As the Berlin Wall was being built in 1961, he fled the DDR for the BRD. In 1962 Dammann was appointed at the University of Marburg, and was able to start a department of African Studies there, with Herrmann Jungraithmayr as an assistant. He retired in 1972 and moved back to Pinneberg, though he continued holding seminars in Marburg until 1985. Throughout his life he held a number of positions outside of his academic appointments—he taught at the Lutherische Theologische Hochschule Oberursel, and was president of the Berlin Missionary Society.

== Research interests, legacy, and politics ==
Dammann traveled regularly to Africa and taught a large number of African languages, including Swahili, Zulu, Herero, Nama, and Oromo. His students include Hildegard Höftmann (Berlin), Thilo C. Schadeberg (Leiden), Brigitte Reineke (Berlin), and Gudrun Miehe, all Africanists of note. A Festschrift was published to honor him on his 65th birthday which, according to one reviewer, reflects "the deep respect in which Professor Ernst Dammann is held by colleagues in the many disciplines to which he contributed". Later, in a 2011 study about racism in how Germans had studied Africa, he was described as an "opportunistic member of the Nazi party" who was "deeply entrenched in racist thought", and his memoir, 70 Jahre erlebte Afrikanistik (1999), shows he "upheld his racist and paternalistic views until late in life". A religious conservative (he also claimed he was a supporter of the constitutional monarchy), he taught that women should not be ordained as parson, but he never left the German Evangelical Church, though his wife did—she joined the Independent Evangelical-Lutheran Church.

== Bibliography ==
- Dichtungen in der Lamu-Mundart des Suaheli. Hamburg 1940. OCLC 731219441
- Die Religionen Afrikas. Stuttgart 1963 (Die Religionen der Menschheit, vol. 6).
- Studien zum Kwangali. Hamburg 1957.
- Grundriss der Religionsgeschichte. Stuttgart 1972. ISBN 9783170104761
- Ndonga-Anthologie. Berlin 1975.
- Die Übersetzung der Bibel in Afrikanische Sprachen. Munich 1975.
- Was Herero erzählten und sangen: Texte, Übersetzung, Kommentar. Berlin 1987.
- Herero-Texte. With Andreas Kukuri. Berlin 1983.
- 70 Jahre erlebte Afrikanistik: ein Beitrag zur Wissenschaftsgeschichte. Berlin 1999. ISBN 9783496026716
- Menschen an meinem Lebensweg. Groß Oesingen 2002.

=== Festschrift ===
- Wort und Religion: Kalima na dini. Studien zur Afrikanistik, Missionswissenschaft, Religionswissenschaft. Ernst Dammann zum 65. Geburtstag, eds. Hans-Jürgen Greschat, Herrmann Jungraithmayr. Stuttgart: Evangelischer Missionsverlag, 1969. OCLC 977062476

=== Further reading ===
- Die Afrikawissenschaften in der DDR. Ulrich van der Heyden. Münster: LIT Verlag, 1999. ISBN 9783825843717
