= Acholi dialect =

Southern Luo Language

Acholi
- Acoli
- Lwo
- Native to: Uganda, South Sudan
- Region: Acholi sub-region, Kiryandongo District and Magwi county
- Ethnicity: Acholi
- Native speakers: 1.5 million in Uganda (2014 census); 27,000 in South Sudan (2000)
- Language family: Nilo-Saharan?: Eastern Sudanic; Southern Eastern; Nilotic; Western; Luo; Southern Luo; Acholi
- Dialects: Labwor (leb Thur); Nyakwai; Dhopaluo (Chope)
- Writing system: Latin

Language codes
- ISO 639-2: ach
- ISO 639-3: Either: ach – Acholi/ Acoli lth – Thur
- Glottolog: acol1236

A man speaking Acholi.

Acholi (/əˈtʃoʊ.li/ ə-CHOH-li, also Leb Acoli, or Leb Lwo) is a Southern Luo language spoken by the Acholi people in the districts of Gulu, Kitgum, Amuru, Lamwo, Agago, Nwoya, Omoro and Pader (a region known as Acholiland) in northern Uganda. The Dhopaluo (Chope) sub-dialect of Acholi is spoken in the Kiryandongo District in the kingdom of Bunyoro. It is also spoken in South Sudan in Magwi County, Eastern Equatoria.

Song of Lawino, well known in African literature, was written in Acholi by Okot p'Bitek, although its sequel, Song of Ocol, was written in English.

Acholi, Alur, and Jo Padola have between 84 and 90 per cent of their vocabulary in common and are mutually intelligible. However, they are often counted as separate languages because their speakers are ethnically distinct. Labwor (Thur), once considered a dialect of Acholi, may not be intelligible with it.

== Phonology ==
Acholi has vowel harmony: all vowels in a word have to belong to a single class (e.g. [kojo] the cold vs. [kɔjɔ] to separate). There are two sets of five vowels, distinguished by the feature [+/-ATR].

[-ATR] vowels in Acholi
	Front	Central	Back
Near-close	ɪ		ʊ
Open-mid	ɛ		ɔ
Open		a	

[+ATR] vowels in Acholi
	Front	Back
Close	i	u
Close-mid	e	o
Open		ɑ

Acholi consonants
		Labial		Alveolar	Palatal	Velar
		plain	lab.	Alveolar	Palatal	Velar
Plosive/ Affricate	voiceless	p	pʷ	t	tʃ	k
Plosive/ Affricate	voiced	b	bʷ	d	ɟ	ɡ
Nasal		m		n	ɲ	ŋ
Rhotic				r		
Approximant				l	j	w

/pʷ/ and /bʷ/ sounds may also sound as labial affricates [pf] and [bv].

Acholi is a tonal language. It has high, low, downstep high and double downstep high tones, but also two contour tones: one rising and one falling. Thus, some words may be distinguished by tone alone, e.g. bèl (low) 'wrinkled' vs. bél (high) 'corn' and kàl (low) 'place enclosed by a palisade' vs. kál (high) 'millet'. Tone furthermore plays a role in verb conjugation.

=== Recent work ===
The above were the old work of the missionaries Alfred Malandra and Crazzolara published in 1955. However, a more up-to-date Acholi orthography by Janet Lakareber shows that a vowel in Acholi language has more than two pronunciations. A monosyllabic word in Acholi has 14 different pronunciations. This is explained in the nine books of Acoli Accented Orthography.

== Notes and references ==
=== Notes ===
1. Heron, G.A., 1972, Introduction p. 8 in p'Bitek, Okot, 1984.
2. Ladefoged et al., 1972:80.

=== Bibliography ===
- Crazzolara, J.P. (1938) A study of the Acooli language. Grammar and Vocabulary. International Institute of African Languages and Cultures. London/New York/Toronto: Oxford University Press.
- Kitching, Arthur Leonard (1932) An outline grammar of the Acholi language (first published 1907). London: Sheldon Press / Kampala: The Uganda Bookshop.
- Ladefoged, Peter; Ruth Glick; Clive Criper; Clifford H. Prator; Livingstone Walusimbi (1972) Language in Uganda (Ford Foundation language surveys vol. 1). London/New York etc. Oxford University Press. ISBN 0-19-436101-2
- Malandra, Alfred (1955) A new Acholi grammar. Kampala: Eagle Press. Hathitrust record
- Okidi, Festo (2000) Acholi for beginners: grammar, Acholi–English, English–Acholi. London: Pilato Books. ISBN 0-9539913-0-X
- p'Bitek, Okot (1985) Acholi proverbs. Nairobi: Heinemann Kenya.
- p'Bitek, Okot (1984) Song of Lawino and Song of Ocol. (African Writers Series, 266). London: Heinemann Educational.
- Janet Lakareber (2011) Coono Leb Acoli (intro) Acoli Accented Orthography. London: GBILA. ISBN 978-0954932305
