= Nuer language =

Nilotic language spoken in western Ethiopia and South Sudan

Nuer
- Thok Naath
- Native to: South Sudan, Ethiopia
- Region: Greater Upper Nile, Gambela Region
- Ethnicity: Nuer
- Native speakers: 1.7 million (2007–2017)
- Language family: Nilo-Saharan?: Eastern Sudanic; Southern Eastern; Nilotic; Western Nilotic; Dinka–Nuer; Nuer-Reel; Nuer
- Dialects: Abigar; Cien; Dor; Eastern Jikany; Lou; Nyuong; Thiang; Western Jikany
- Writing system: Latin

Language codes
- ISO 639-3: nus
- Glottolog: nuer1246

The Nuer language (Thok Naath, "people's language") is a Nilotic language of the Western Nilotic group. It is spoken by the Nuer people of South Sudan and in western Ethiopia (region of Gambela). The language is very similar to Dinka and Atuot.

The language is written with a Latin-based alphabet. There are several dialects of Nuer, although all share one written standard. For example, final /k/, is pronounced in the Jikany dialect but is dropped in other dialects despite being indicated in the Nuer orthography used by all.

== Phonology ==
A phonological analysis has yet to be done. The following consonants may therefore not all be distinct.

Consonants
		Labial	Dental	Alveolar	Palatal	Velar	Glottal
Nasal		m	n̪	n	ɲ	ŋ	
Plosive	Voiceless	p	t̪	t	c	k	
Plosive	Voiced	b	d̪	d	ɟ	ɡ	
Flap			ɾ̪				
Approximant		w	l̪		j		h

Voicing is not distinctive at the end of a stem, regardless of whether it's at the end of a word or utterance. Consonant clusters due to suffixes tend to be simplified.

Dental consonants are written th dh nh in the practical orthography. /h/ is written ɣ.

Vowels may be long or short, modal or breathy voiced. The latter are written with an underscore in the practical orthography, except for u and ä /ə̤/, where there is no modal-voiced vowel to contrast.

Vowels
	Front	Central	Back
High	i iː i̤ i̤ː		ṳ ṳː
Close-mid	e eː e̤ e̤ː		o oː o̤ o̤ː
Open-mid	ɛ ɛː ɛ̤ ɛ̤ː	ə̤ ə̤ː	ɔ ɔː ɔ̤ ɔ̤ː
Near-low	(æ æː æ̤ æ̤ː)		
Low			aː a̤ː

{æ} is rare. (Curly brackets indicate the set of æ vowels.) Final {i} is always breathy voiced. There does not appear to be a distinction between short a and ə. Breathy {o} is pronounced [ʊ] or [ɵ].

Faust & Grossman did not find strong evidence for lexical or grammatical tone, with a few exceptions such as the 1sg suffix /ə̌/ and the plural suffix /nǐ/ ~ /ǐ/, which have a rising tone.

== Nominal inflection ==
Nuer nouns inflect for two numbers, singular and plural, and three cases, nominative, genitive and locative. At first glance the inflection is wholly non-systematic and resists description in terms of paradigms: just two suffixes /-kʌ̤/ and /-ni̤/ are used in sixteen different patterns across the stock of nouns, together with different selections from around sixty stem alternations, a situation that Baerman called "paradigmatic chaos". Further research has identified more constraints and regularities governing Nuer nominal inflection.

There are various methods of plural noun formation in the Nuer language. Generally speaking, plural nouns are formed from singular nouns with the addition of plural markings, and tone changes. Countable nouns, collective nouns, and mass nouns take markings to show a singular state. This means that every noun in the Nuer language can potentially appear in a singular or plural form. Loan words also follow this process.

The most readily identifiable plural formation processes are: suffixation, vowel insertion, phonation, vowel quality change, final consonant alteration, vowel deletion, glide insertion, tone change, vowel lengthening, vowel shortening, suppletion, and zero or null formation, among other processes when the entire language is taken into account.

The most basic plural suffix is the suffix -ni̱. This suffix is used after words that end in sounds other than [l] and [r]. Words that end in [l] and [r] take the suffix -i̱. However, apart from this suffix there are other methods to form plural nouns.

== Dialects ==
Ethnologue lists the following dialects of Nuer.

- Eastern Jikany (Jekaing, Jikain)
- Abigar
- Western Jikany
- Cien
- Lou
- Nyuong
- Thiang
- Bul Chol
- Gawaar
- Laak
- Jagei (geai koay)
- Leek
- Dok
- Haak

== Nuer communities ==
A speaker of Nuer recorded in the United States.

There are different dialects spoken by Nuer groups living in various locations in South Sudan. Some of the Nuer people live in Western Ethiopia. They are called Jikany Nuer. The Nuer of the Upper Nile State are also called Jikany, and those in Jonglei State Lou, Gawaar, Thiang and Laak.

There are also seven counties inhabited by the other groups of Nuer in the western part of the Upper Nile Province currently known as Unity State Bentiu. These counties include:

- Guit County: Inhabited by Jikany kuec cieng community in the eastern Bentiu
- Mayom County: Inhabited by Bul Chol Geah community in the western part of the state
- Rubkona County: Inhabited by Leek community in the northern Bentiu
- Koch County: Inhabited by Jagei community in the central Bentiu
- Mayiandit County: Inhabited by Haak Bakol-kuoth community in the far south-western part of the state, they are also known as Gatbakol-kuoth.
- Leer County: Inhabited by Dok community in the southern part of the state.
- Payinjiar county:Inhabited by Nyuong community in the far southern part of the state.

Among the 120,000 people at the United Nations Protection of Civilians Site Bentiu, Nuer is the preferred language for radio and news.

Nuer-speaking Sudanese refugees have formed a significant community in Omaha, Nebraska, United States.

== Sample phrases ==
Nuer: Naath dial diethɛ kɛ a lɔr kä päärkɛ kɛ ciaŋ malä a mäni cuŋkiɛn. Tekɛ kɛ ca̱r kɛnɛ nhök ti de lät kɛ raan kɛ dämaan a gɔa.

English: “All human beings are born free and equal in dignity and rights. They are endowed with reason and conscience and should act towards one another in a spirit of brotherhood”.

(Article 1 of the Universal Declaration of Human Rights)

== Writing system ==
The alphabet of Nuer uses 39 distinct letters, shown below in uppercase (majuscule) and lowercase (minuscule) styles.

Majuscules
A	A̱	Ä	B	C	D	Dh	E	E̱	Ë	Ɛ	Ɛ̱	Ɛ̈	G	Ɣ	H	I	I̱	J
K	L	M	N	Ŋ	Nh	Ny	O	O̱	Ö	Ɔ	Ɔ̱	P	R	T	Th	U	W	Y
Minuscules
a	a̱	ä	b	c	d	dh	e	e̱	ë	ɛ	ɛ̱	ɛ̈	g	ɣ	h	i	i̱	j
k	l	m	n	ŋ	nh	ny	o	o̱	ö	ɔ	ɔ̱	p	r	t	th	u	w	y

A line under a vowel, like a̱, means that it is pronounced with breathy voice. The vowels ä, u, and final i are always breathy. A doubled vowel, like in the word raan (person), means that vowel is long. Nuer does have tone, but tone-based contrasts are not common.

=== History ===
The writing system was adopted in 1928 with minor changes being added over the history of the language. Both the Dinka and the Nuer agreed that their languages were so different that they could never share written languages, but they did come up with several common principles.

- final interdental consonants would always be represented as th.
- all voiceless alveolo-palatal consonants would be represented as c.
- the finalized Nuer alphabet consists of the following characters, which are equivalent to the phonemes of the Nuer language: d, k, l, m, n, p, t, w, g, j, r, y, ŋ, ny, th, dh, nh, ɣ, c, a, e, i, o, u, ö

== See also ==
- Dinka language
- Nuer people
- Dinka people
- Western Nilotic languages
- Nilotic languages
