= Dinka language =

Nilotic dialect cluster spoken by the Dinka people of South Sudan

Dinka
- Thuɔŋjäŋ
- Native to: South Sudan
- Ethnicity: Dinka
- Native speakers: 4.2 million (2017)
- Language family: Nilo-Saharan?: Eastern Sudanic; Southern Eastern; Nilotic; Western; Dinka–Nuer; Dinka
- Writing system: Latin

Official status
- Official language in: South Sudan

Language codes
- ISO 639-2: din
- ISO 639-3: din – inclusive code Individual codes: dip – Northeastern (Padang) diw – Northwestern (Ruweng) dib – South Central (Gok, Agar, Ciec, and Aliab) dks – Southeastern: (Bor, Nyarweng, Hol, Twi) dik – Southwestern (Rek & Twic)
- Glottolog: dink1262

Dinka (natively Thuɔŋjäŋ, Thuɔŋ ë Jiɛ̈ɛ̈ŋ or simply Jiɛ̈ɛ̈ŋ) is a Nilotic dialect cluster spoken by the Dinka people, a major ethnic group of South Sudan. There are several main varieties, such as Padang, Rek, Agaar, Ciec, Malual, Aliab, Bor, Hol, Nyarweng, Twic East and Twic Mayardit, which are distinct enough (though mutually intelligible) to require separate literary standards. Jaang, Jieng or Muonyjieng is used as a general term to cover all Dinka languages. Recently Akutmɛ̈t Latueŋ Thuɔŋjäŋ (the Dinka Language Development Association) has proposed a unified written grammar of Dinka.

The language most closely related to Dinka is the Nuer language. The Luo languages are also closely related. The Dinka vocabulary shows considerable proximity to Nubian, which is probably due to medieval interactions between the Dinka people and the kingdom of Alodia.

The Dinka are found mainly along the Nile, specifically the west bank of the White Nile, a major tributary flowing north from Uganda, north and south of the Sudd marsh in South Kordofan state of Sudan as well as Bahr el Ghazal region and Upper Nile state of South Sudan.

== Linguistic features ==
=== Phonology ===
==== Consonants ====
There are 20 consonant phonemes:

		Labial	Dental	Alveolar	Palatal	Velar
Nasal		m	n̪	n	ɲ	ŋ
Plosive	voiceless	p	t̪	t	c	k
Plosive	voiced	b	d̪	d	ɟ	ɡ
Fricative						ɣ
Approximant				l	j	w
Tap				ɾ		

==== Vowels ====
Dinka has a rich vowel system, with thirteen phonemically contrastive short vowels. There are seven vowel qualities plus a two-way distinction in phonation. The underdots, [◌̤], mark the breathy voice series, represented in Dinka orthography by diaereses, ⟨◌̈⟩. Unmarked vowels are modal or creaky voiced.

	Front		Back	
	plain	breathy	plain	breathy
Close	i	ï	u	
Close-mid	e	ë	o	ö
Open-mid	ɛ	ɛ̈	ɔ	ɔ̈
Open			a	ä

Four phonetic phonations have been described in Dinka vowels: modal voice, breathy voice, faucalized voice, and harsh voice. The modal series has creaky or harsh voice realizations in certain environments, while the breathy vowels are centralized and have been described as being hollow voiced (faucalized). This is independent of tone.

On top of this, there are three phonemically contrastive vowel lengths, a feature found in very few languages. Most Dinka verb roots are single, closed syllables with either a short or a long vowel. Some inflections lengthen that vowel:

- /lèl/ 'isolate\2SG'
- /lèːl/ 'isolate\3SG'
- /léːl/ 'provoke\2SG'
- /lèːːl/ 'provoke\3SG'

short	ràaan ā-lèl	"You are isolating a person (ràaan)."
long	ràaan ā-lèel	"He is isolating a person."
overlong	ràaan ā-lèeel	"He is provoking a person."

==== Tone ====
The extensive use of tone and its interaction with morphology is a notable feature of all dialects of Dinka. The Bor dialects all have four tonemes at the syllable level: Low, High, Mid, and Fall.

In Bor proper, falling tone is not found on short vowels except as an inflection for the passive in the present tense. In Nyaarweng and Twïc it is not found at all. In Bor proper, and perhaps in other dialects as well, Fall is only realized as such at the end of a prosodic phrase. Elsewhere it becomes High.

In Bor proper and perhaps other dialects, a Low tone is phonetically low only after another low tone. Elsewhere it is falling, but not identical to Fall: It does not become High in the middle of a phrase, and speakers can distinguish the two falling tones despite the fact that they have the same range of pitch. The difference appears to be in the timing: with Fall one hears a high level tone that then falls, whereas the falling allophone of Low starts falling and then levels out. (That is, one falls on the first mora of the vowel, whereas the other falls on the second mora.) This is unusual because it has been theorized that such timing differences are never phonemic.

=== Morphology ===
This language exhibits vowel ablaut or apophony, the change of internal vowels (similar to English goose/geese):

Singular	Plural	gloss	vowel alternation
dom	duum	'field/fields'	(o–u)
kaat	kɛt	'frame/frames'	(a–ɛ)

== Dialects ==
Linguists divide Dinka into five languages or dialect clusters corresponding to their geographic location with respect to each other:

Northeastern and western:

- Padaŋ de Ayuël jiel (Abiliang, Nyiël, Ageer, Döŋjɔl).
- Luäc (Akook, Wieu, Aguer)
- Ŋɔŋ de Jok (Upper Nile)
- Rut
- Thoi

Western:

- Ŋɔŋ de Jok Athuorkok (Abyei)
- Ŋɔŋ de Jok de Awet
- Kuel de Ruweeng (Panaru, Aloor ku Paweny)

South Central:

- Aliab
- Ciëc (Jang)
- Gɔ̈k
- Agaar

Southeastern:

- Bor
- Twic (Twi)
- Nyarweng
- Hol

Southwestern:

- Malual-Jiɛrnyaaŋ (Abiëm, Paliëët, Aroyo, Paliëupiny ku Pajok)
- Luänyjäŋ
- Twic Bol

Rek

- Aguɔɔk
- Apuk
- Awan Cän
- Awan Mɔ̈u
- Kuac Ayɔɔk
- Abiëm Mayär
- Abiɔŋ Ayɔɔm
- Nöi Ayii
- Nyaŋ Aköc
- Atok Buk
- Ler Akën
- Awan Parek
- Lɔn Mawien
- Lɔn Paɣer
- Kɔŋgör Arop
- Apuk Padɔc
- Muɔk Aköt Wut
- Yär Ayiɛɛi
- Apuk Jurwïïr
- Thɔny Amɔ̈u
- Luäny Bol Malek
- Aköök Deŋ Acuïïl
- Thïïk/Thïŋ Majɔk
- Kɔŋ-ŋör Akuëcbɛ̈ny
- Pakɔɔr
- Adöör Mabiör Dääu
- Bäc

These would be largely mutually intelligible if it were not for the importance of tone in grammatical inflection, as the grammatical function of tone differs from one variety to another.

See Ethnologue online map of Sudan for locations of dialects.

== Writing system ==
Dinka was first written with several different Latin alphabets developed by missionaries during the late 19th and early 20th centuries. Its current script, which is based on a system used by other southern Sudanese languages, was declared official at the 1928 Rejaf Language Conference. The first translation of the New Testament into Dinka was released in 2006.

== Sample text ==
Article 1 of the Universal Declaration of Human Rights

Dinka: Kuat ë raan ëbën, acï dhiëëth ke lääu nhom ku aa thöŋ nhïïm ë yithiic. Ku aa thiekiic, ku aacï ke yiëk nyith ku puɔ̈u bïï kek ya tak ku yekë ceŋ kake ye mïth ëtik.

English: All human beings are born free and equal in dignity and rights. They are endowed with reason and conscience and should act towards one another in a spirit of brotherhood.

== See also ==
- Dinka people
- Nilo-Saharan languages

== Other resources ==
- Andersen, Torben (1987). "The phonemic system of Agar Dinka". Journal of African Languages and Linguistics. 9: 1–27. doi:10.1515/jall.1987.9.1.1. S2CID 143964845.
- Andersen, Torben (1990). "Vowel length in Western Nilotic languages". Acta Linguistica Hafniensia. 22 (1): 5–26. doi:10.1080/03740463.1990.10411520.
- Andersen, Torben (1991). "Subject and topic in Dinka". Studies in Language. 15 (2): 265–294. doi:10.1075/sl.15.2.02and.
- Andersen, Torben (1993). "Vowel quality alternation in Dinka verb inflection". Phonology. 10 (1): 1–42. doi:10.1017/S095267570000172X. JSTOR 4615426. S2CID 62712266.
- Beltrame, G. (1870). Grammatica della lingua denka. Firenze: G. Civelli.
- Beswick, Stephanie (2004). Sudan's Blood Memory. University of Rochester. ISBN 1580462316.
- Malou, Job (1988). Dinka Vowel System. Summer Institute of Linguistics and the University of Texas at Arlington Publications in Linguistics. Vol. 82. ISBN 0-88312-008-9.
- Mitterrutzner, J. C. (1866). Die Dinka-Sprache in Central-Afrika; Kurze Grammatik, Text und Worterbuch. Brixen: A. Weger.
- Nebel, A. (1979). Dinka–English, English–Dinka dictionary (2nd ed.). Bologna: Editrice Missionaria Italiana.
- Nebel, A. (1948). Dinka Grammar (Rek-Malual dialect) with texts and vocabulary. Verona: Instituto Missioni Africane.
- Trudinger, R. (1942–44). English-Dinka Dictionary. Sudan Interior Mission.
- Turhan, Sedat; Hagin, Sally (2005). Milet Picture Dictionary English-Dinka. Milet.
