= Shilluk language =

Luo language spoken in part of South Sudan and Sudan

Shilluk
- Dhøg Cøllø
- Pronunciation: [d̪ɔɡ cɔllɔ]
- Native to: South Sudan
- Region: Upper Nile State
- Ethnicity: Shilluk
- Native speakers: 570,000 (2017)
- Language family: Nilo-Saharan?: Eastern Sudanic?; Southern Eastern?; Nilotic; Western; Luo; Northern; Shilluk
- Dialects: Gar; Kwak; Mwomo
- Writing system: Latin

Official status
- Official language in: Shilluk Kingdom

Language codes
- ISO 639-3: shk
- Glottolog: shil1265

Shilluk (natively Dhøg Cøllø, [d̪ɔ́(ɡ) cɔ̀llɔ̀]) is a language spoken by the Shilluk people of South Sudan. It is closely related to other Luo languages. The term Shilluk is a pronunciation of Arabic origin.

== Phonology ==
=== Vowels ===
	Front	Central	Back
Close	i [i] i̠ [i̠] ɪ [ɪ] ɪ̠ [ɪ̠]		u [u] u̠ [u̠] ʊ [ʊ] ʊ̠ [ʊ̠]
Mid	e [e] e̠ [e̠] ɛ [ɛ] ɛ̠ [ɛ̠]		o [o] o̠ [o̠] ɔ [ɔ] ɔ̠ [ɔ̠]
Open		ʌ [ʌ] ʌ̠ [ʌ̠] a [a] a̠ [a̠]	

Each of these vowels also exists in a long form and an overlong form which are phonemic.

==== Advanced and retracted tongue root ====
Shilluk, like most Nilotic languages, differentiates vowels according to their place of articulation. They are either pronounced with advancement of the root of the tongue or with retraction of the root of the tongue. Gilley uses the terms "extended larynx" or "blown vowel".

The vowels with advancement of the root of the tongue are [i], [e], [o], [ɔ], [a] and their corresponding long variants. The vowels with retraction of the root of the tongue are denoted by a macron below the letter: [i̠], [e̠], [o̠], [ɔ̠], [u̠] and [a̠] and their corresponding long variants.

=== Consonants ===
		Labial	Coronal		Dorsal	
		Labial	Dental	Alveolar	Palatal	Velar
Nasal		m [m]	n̪ [n̪]	n [n]	ɲ [ɲ]	ŋ [ŋ]
Plosive	voiceless	p [p]	t̪ [t̪]	t [t]	c [c]	k [k]
Plosive	voiced	b [b]	d̪ [d̪]	d [d]	j [ɟ]	g [ɡ]
Fricative				s [s]		
Liquid	rhotic			r [r]		
Liquid	lateral			l [l]		
Glide		w [w]			y [j]	

=== Tone ===
Shilluk has a rich inventory of tones, with at least seven distinctive tone patterns or tonemes.

There are three level tonemes: Low, Mid and High. In addition, there are four contours – the Rise and three falling configurations: Fall, High Fall and Late Fall. These are denoted by the following diacritics:

	Tone description	Diacritic	Tone bars
Level	Low	cv̀c (grave accent)	꜖
Level	Mid	cv̄c (macron)	꜔
Level	High	cv́c (acute accent)	꜒
Contoured	Rising	cv̌c (caron)	꜖꜔
Contoured	Falling	cv̂c (circumflex)	꜔꜖
Contoured	High Falling	cv̂́c (circumflex with acute accent)	꜒꜖
Contoured	Late Falling	cv́c̀ (acute accent followed by grave accent)	꜒꜒꜖

=== Syllable structure ===
Uninflected native stem syllables are overwhelmingly monosyllabic. With few exceptions, these monosyllabic stems typically consist of an onset, a vowel (nucleus), and a coda. Their structure is: C(C_{j/w})V(V)(V)C.

== Grammar ==
=== Morphology ===
Monosyllabic stems give rise to polysyllabic words through processes of derivation or inflection. For verbs and nouns alike, the most common prefixes are /a- ʊ-/, and the most common suffixes are /-Cɪ -ɪ -a (-ɔ)/. Further, alternations of vowel length and tone play an important part in inflectional morphology.

=== Verbs ===
==== Transitive verb classes ====
Shilluk transitive verbs have a phonological root that consists of a single closed syllable of the form /C(j/w)V(V)C/. "That is, the root vowel is either short or long, and clustering of consonants is restricted to the onset, where either of the semivowels /w,j/ may follow another consonant." There are seven classes distinguished by alternations in terms of vowel length and tone. These differences are illustrated by subject-voice past, past second-person singular, and object-voice imperfective in the table below.

The Seven Classes of Transitive Verbs
Verb classes	Fixed short		Short with grade		Long		
Verb classes	Low	Low fall	Low	Low fall	Low	Low fall	High fall
Example	{ŋɔ̀l} ‘cut’	{lɛ̂ŋ} ‘drum’	{càm} ‘eat’	{mʌ̂l} ‘roast’	{lɛ̀ɛŋ} ‘throw’	{mâat̪} ‘drink’	{mấal} ‘praise’
SV past	á-ŋɔ̀l	á-lɛ̂ŋ	á-càm	á-mʌ̂l	á-lɛ̀ɛŋ	á-mâat̪	á-mấal
Past 2SG	á-ŋɔ̀l	á-lɛ̂ŋ	á-càaam	á-mʌ̂ʌʌl	á-lɛ̀ɛɛŋ	á-mâaat̪	á-mấaal
OV IMPF	ʊ̀-ŋɔ̀l-ɔ̀	ʊ̀-lɛ̂ŋ-ɔ̀	ʊ̀-càaam-ɔ̀	ʊ̀-mʌ̂ʌʌl-ɔ̀	ʊ̀-lɛ̀ɛɛŋ-ɔ̀	ʊ̀-mâaat̪-ɔ̀	ʊ̀-mấaal-ɔ̀

=== Nouns ===
Noun inflection is characterized by head marking: pertensive and construct-state are both inflections that mark the head, not the dependent. For example, English has a person's rodent, where the head is rodent, and the possessive marking is on the dependent person's. In contrast, Shilluk has a pretensive affix on the head (e.g., dúup = "rodent", dû́uup = "rodent belonging to").

Number is marked, but no predictable system has been identified. Instead, there are over 140 different patterns of number marking on nouns.

Numerals in Shilluk are nouns.

== Orthography ==
A Latin alphabet was developed for Shilluk by Christian missionaries in the early 20th century. There are 29 characters in Shilluk orthography; 10 vowels and 19 consonants.

a	á	à	ä	aa	b	c	d	dh	e	é	è	ë	ee	f	g
i	í	ì	ï	ii	j	k	l	lg	lh	ly	m	ng	nh	ny	o
ó	ò	ö	ø	oo	p	q	r	t	th	u	ú	ù	ü	uu	v
w	x	y													

== Oral literature ==
In 1912, Diedrich Westermann published The Shilluk People, their Language and Folklore, which contains a wide selection of texts in the Shilluk language with English translations; there are 61 tales in addition to prayers, songs and riddles. The book also contains a Shilluk grammar. Here are some of the riddles:

- "nemei ki rei gen fa gute: tune dean." "Brothers who never hurt each other: the two horns of a cow."
- "nejok gwoti fen: dwei." "The black-white cow is making white the earth: the moon."
- "nemei doge lun fen: orom." "Two brothers, their mouth is turned down: the nose."
- "Agar agar, yat win: lek." "A long row of trees full of white birds: the teeth. (Along the rivers one sees frequently trees which are literally covered with snow-white birds.)"

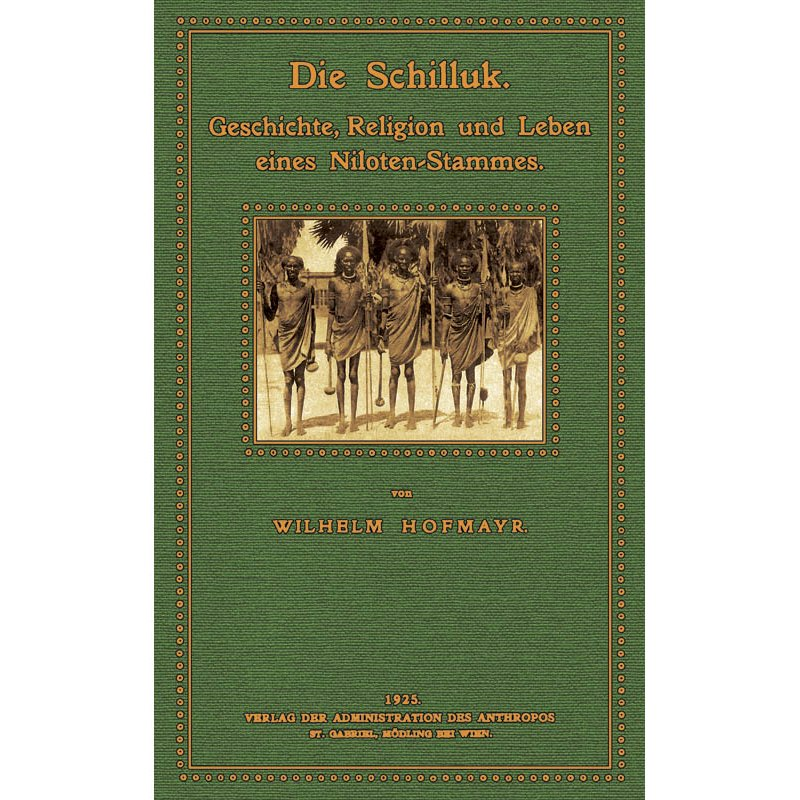
Book cover of Hofmayr's Die Schilluk (1925)

For a selection of over 200 Shilluk proverbs and riddles with German translations, see Die Schilluk. Geschichte, Religion und Leben eines Niloten-stammes by Wilhelm Hofmayr. This book also contains songs in Shilluk, and some of the songs have an accompanying musical transcription.

== Sample text ==
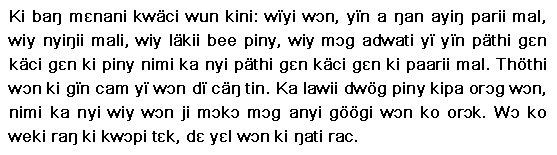
Gwɛtti Dhɔ Cɔlɔ mi tyɛli malɔ

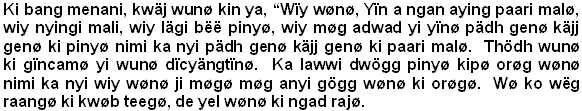
Gwedd ki Dhøg Cøllø men nyänø

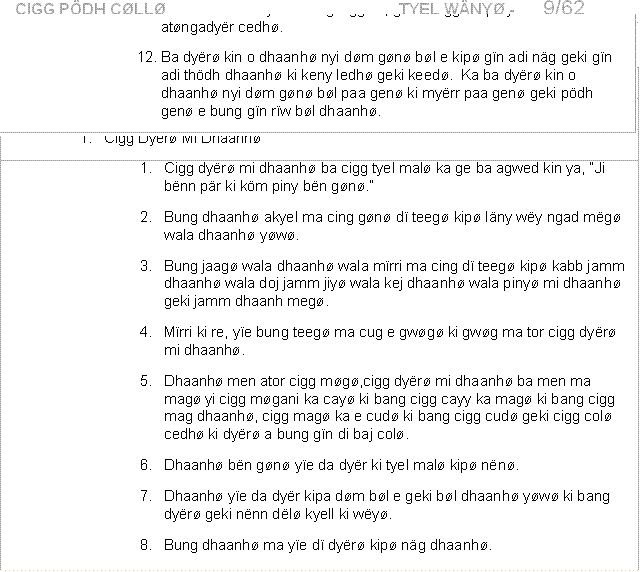
Cigg dyërø mi dhaanhø ki Dhøg Cøllø ki yij wänyø mi cigg Pödh Cøllø
