= Alur language =

Western Nilotic language of Uganda

Alur
- Lur
- Region: Orientale Province (Democratic Republic of Congo), Nebbi and Zombo districts of Uganda
- Ethnicity: Alur
- Native speakers: (1.7 million cited 2001–2014)
- Language family: Nilo-Saharan?: Eastern Sudanic?; Southern Eastern?; Nilotic; Western; Luo; Southern Luo; Adhola-Alur-Luo; Alur
- Dialects: Jokot; Jonam; Mambisa; Wanyoro
- Writing system: Latin

Language codes
- ISO 639-3: alz
- Glottolog: alur1250

Alur (Dho-Alur [d̟ɔ.a.lur]) is a Western Nilotic language spoken in the southern West Nile region of Uganda and the northeastern Ituri Province of the Democratic Republic of the Congo. The language's subdialects are Jokot, Jonam/Lo-Naam (mainly spoken in the Democratic Republic of the Congo), Mambisa and Wanyoro.

== Phonology ==
=== Vowels ===
Alur has 9 vowels.

	Front	Central	Back
Close	i		u
Near-close	ɪ		ʊ
Close-mid	e		o
Open-mid	ɛ		ɔ
Open		ä	

=== Consonants ===
Alur has 23 consonants.

	Labial	Labio-dental	Dental	Alveolar	Palato-alveolar	Palatal	Velar	Glottal
Nasal	m			n		ɲ	ŋ	
Plosive	p b		t̟ d̟	t d			k ɡ	
Fricative		f v		s z				h
Affricate					tʃ dʒ			
Trill				r				
Approximant	w			l		j		

== Central Sudanic influence ==
The Alur language has significant influence from neighboring Central Sudanic languages, as the Alur are largely descended from central Sudanic speakers who shifted to a Luo language relatively recently.

There is extensive bilingualism between speakers of Alur and the neighbouring Central Sudanic language Lendu. Alur has also been influenced by Central Sudanic varieties such as Okebo and Madi. As Southall observes, speech styles among the Alur have been strongly influenced by their Central Sudanic neighbours, e.g. as shown by the frequent use of ideophonic expressions. The latter often contain implosives as well as labiovelar stops in these languages. Compare Lendu (Central Sudanic) ɓlɔɓlɔ ‘stealthily’ and ɓlɔɓlɔ in Alur. In other words, not only do we find “foreign pronunciation” influence in the phonological system of the Nilotic language Alur, specific fashions of speaking in its speech community have also been affected by these contacts.

== Orthography ==
The Alur language has no officially accepted orthography. Some informal conventions have been established in written materials and road signs.

There is usually no written tonal distinction. Second, the phonemic distinction between /ŋ/ and /ng/ is occasionally reflected in the orthography, with /ŋ/ represented by 'ŋ' and /ng/ represented by 'ng'. However, /ŋ/ is also frequently written as 'ng', confusing it orthographically with /ng/.
