= Luo languages =

Nilo-Saharan language spoken in East Africa

Luo
- Lwo, Lwoo, Luwoian
- Geographic distribution: southwestern Ethiopia, South Sudan, Sudan, northeastern Congo (DRC), northern Uganda, southwestern Kenya, northern Tanzania
- Ethnicity: Luo peoples
- Linguistic classification: Nilo-Saharan?: Eastern Sudanic; Southern Eastern; Nilotic; Western Nilotic; Luo
- Subdivisions: Northern Luo; Southern Luo

Language codes
- Glottolog: lwoo1234

The dozen Luo, Lwo or Lwoian languages are spoken by the Luo peoples in an area ranging from southern Sudan to western Ethiopia to southern Kenya, with Dholuo extending into northern Tanzania and Alur into the Democratic Republic of the Congo. They form one of the two branches of the Western Nilotic family, the other being the Dinka–Nuer. The Southern Luo varieties are mutually intelligible, and apart from ethnic identity they might be considered a single language.

== Classification ==
The time depth of the division of the Luo languages is moderate, perhaps close to two millennia. The division within the Southern Luo language dialect cluster is considerably shallower, perhaps five to eight centuries, reflecting migrations due to the impact of the Islamization of the Sudan region.

The Luo languages are classified within the Glottolog database as follows:

- Lwoo
  - Northern Lwoo
    - Anuak
    - Belanda Bor
    - Luwo–Thuri
      - Luwo
      - Thuri
    - Päri
    - Shilluk
  - Southern Lwoo
    - Acoli
    - Adhola–Alur–Luo
      - Adhola–Luo
        - Adhola
        - Luo (Kenya and Tanzania)
      - Alur
    - Lango–Kumam
      - Kumam
      - Lango (Uganda)

According to Mechthild Reh, the Northern Luo languages are classified as follows:

- Northern
  - Shilluk
  - Belanda Bor
    - Bodho
    - Col
    - Manangeer
    - Thuri
    - Jur
    - Anuak
    - Päri

== Bibliography ==
- Gilley, Leoma G. 2004. "The Lwoian family." Occasional Papers in the Study of Sudanese Languages, 9, 165–174.
