= Nilotic languages =

Small language family of East Africa

Nilotic
- Geographic distribution: Southwestern Egypt, Ethiopia, Sudan, South Sudan, northeastern Congo (DRC), northern/eastern Uganda, western/southern Kenya, and northern Tanzania
- Ethnicity: Nilotic peoples
- Native speakers: 31 million
- Linguistic classification: Nilo-Saharan?: Eastern Sudanic?; Southern Eastern?; Nilotic
- Proto-language: Proto-Nilotic
- Subdivisions: Eastern; Southern; Western

Language codes
- Glottolog: nilo1247
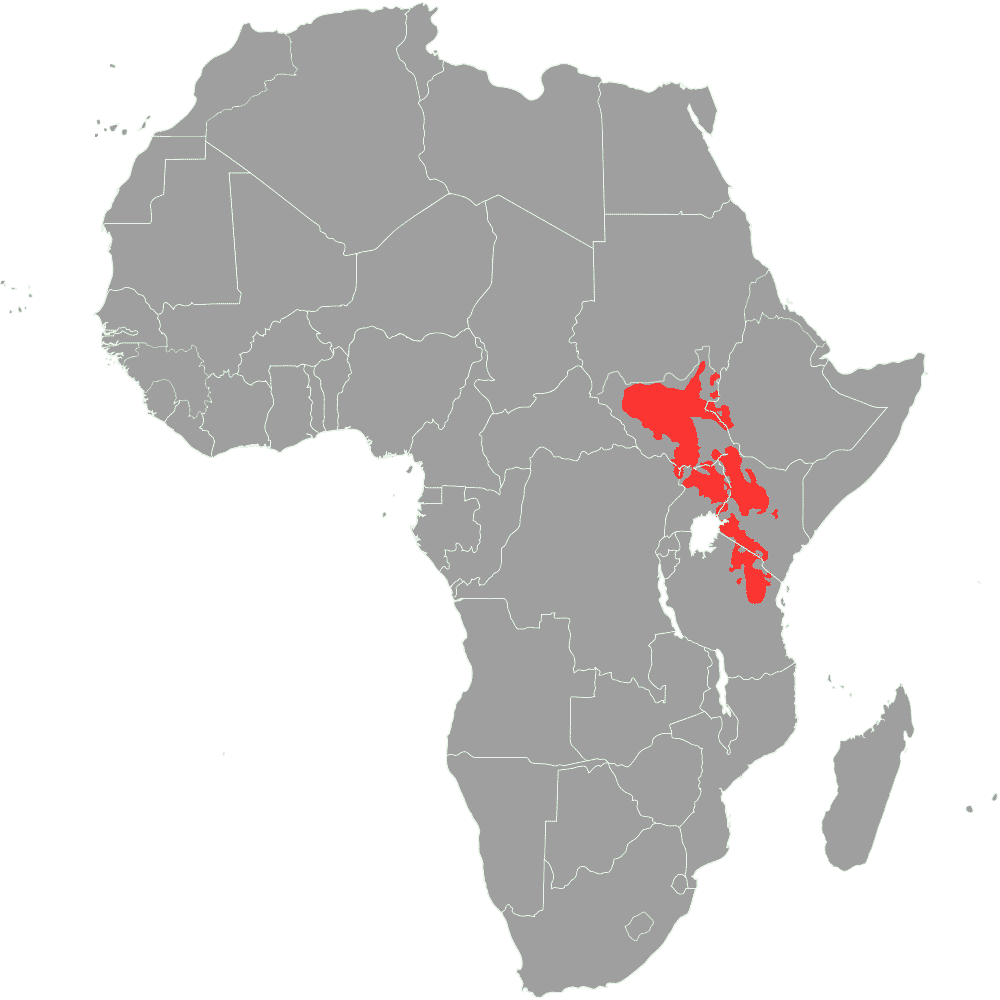
- Region where Nilotic languages are spoken

The Nilotic languages are languages spoken across wide areas between Egypt, Ethiopia, Sudan, South Sudan, Democratic Republic of Congo, Kenya, Uganda and Tanzania by the Nilotic peoples.

== Etymology ==
The word Nilotic means of or relating to the Nile River or to the Nile region of Africa. The Nile River runs from Rwanda through various countries down to Egypt.

== Demographics ==
Nilotic peoples, who are the native speakers of the languages, originally migrated from the Gezira area in Sudan. Nilotic language speakers live in parts of the Democratic Republic of the Congo, Ethiopia, Kenya, Egypt, Sudan, South Sudan, Tanzania and Uganda.

== Subdivisions ==
According to linguist Joseph Greenberg, the language family is divided into three subgroups:

1. Eastern Nilotic languages such as Turkana and Maasai
2. Southern Nilotic languages such as Kalenjin and Datooga
3. Western Nilotic languages such as Luo, Nuer and Dinka

These Nilotic languages' groupings are geographical classifications rather than mutual intelligibility. For instance, the Dinka is a different language from the Luo, which is also different from Nuer etc. Some words may sound similar due to shared location although these are distinct ethnic groups, with distinct speeches. Dinka and Nuer languages are not mutually intelligible but they share a common vocabulary since both languages are related Western Nilotic languages.

Before Greenberg's reclassification, Nilotic was used to refer to Western Nilotic alone, with the other two being grouped as related "Nilo-Hamitic" languages.

Blench (2012) treats the Burun languages as a fourth subgroup of Nilotic. In previous classifications, the languages were included within the Luo languages. Starostin (2015) treats the Mabaan-Burun languages as "West Nilotic" but outside the Luo level.

== Reconstruction ==
Over 200 Proto-Nilotic lexical roots have been reconstructed by Dimmendaal (1988). Dimmendaal reconstructs the Proto-Nilotic consonants as follows:

		Labial	Dental	Alveolar	Palatal	Velar	Uvular
Plosive	voiceless	p	t̪	t	c	k	(q)
Plosive	voiced	b	d̪	d	(ɟ)	ɡ	
Fricative				s			ʀ
Implosive		ɓ		ɗ	ʄ		
Nasal		m		n	ɲ	ŋ	
Trill				r			
Lateral				l			
Approximant					j	w	

== Numerals ==
Comparison of numerals in individual languages:

Classification	Language	1	2	3	4	5	6	7	8	9	10
Eastern, Bari	Bari	ɡɛ́lɛ̀ŋ	mʊ̀rɛ́k	mʊ̀sálà	ɪ́ŋwàn	mʊ̀kánàt	búkɛ̀r	búryò	búdö̀k	bʊ́ŋwàn	púwö̀k
Eastern, Lotuxo-Teso, Lotuxo-Maa, Lotuxo	Lopit	F / M nàbóìtóì / lòbóìtóì	lòhórìk, arik	lòhúnìk	lóŋwán	mìyét (litː < 'hand')	ile	hatarik (5 + 2)	hotohunɪk (5 + 3)	hotoŋwan (5 + 4)	tomon
Eastern, Lotuxo-Teso, Lotuxo-Maa, Lotuxo	Lotuho (Lotuxo) (1)	ábótè	áréhè	húníhe	áŋwàn	mìyyàt (litː < 'hand')	ɪ́lle	hàtmɪk (5 + 2)	hùtohunɪk (5 + 3)	hùtoŋwan (5 + 4)	tòmmòn
Eastern, Lotuxo-Teso, Lotuxo-Maa, Lotuxo	Lotuho (Lotuxo) (2)	ʌ̀bóíté / âbotye	ʌ̀ríxèy / árrexai	xúnixòì / xunixoi	aŋwân	míèt < 'hand'	ɪ́llɛ́	xáttàrɪ̀k (5 + 2)	xóttóxúnìk (5 + 3)	xɔ́ttɔ́ŋwàn (5 + 4)	tɔ́mɔ̀n
Eastern, Lotuxo-Teso, Lotuxo-Maa, Ongamo-Maa	Maasai	nabô (fem), obô (masc), nebô (place)	aré (fem), aàre/ɔáre (masc)	uní (fem), okúni (masc)	oŋwán (fem), oóŋwan (masc)	ímíêt	ílɛ̂ / íllɛ̂	naápishana (f.), oópishana (m.)	ísíêt < Kalenjin	naáudo (fem), oódó (masc)	tɔ́mɔ̂n < Kalenjin
Eastern, Lotuxo-Teso, Lotuxo-Maa, Ongamo-Maa	Samburu	naɓô (fem), oɓô (masc), noɓô (place)	aré (fem), waáre (masc)	uní (fem), okúni (masc)	onɠwán (fem), oónɠwan (masc)	ímɟêt / ímʄêt	ílê	sápâ	ísɟêt / ísʄêt < Kalenjin	sâːl	tômôn < Kalenjin
Eastern, Lotuxo-Teso, Teso-Turkana, Teso	Teso (Ateso) (1)	ìdʸòpét	ìɑɾè	íwúní	íwóŋón	íkɑ̀ɲ	íkɑ̀ɲɑ̂pè (5 + 1)	íkɑ̀ɲɑ̂ɾè (5 + 2)	íkɑ̀ɲɑ̂wùní (5 + 3)	íkɑ̀ɲɑ̂wòŋòn (5 + 4)	ítòmòn
Eastern, Lotuxo-Teso, Teso-Turkana, Teso	Teso (Ateso) (2)	-diope	-árèy	-(w)únì	-oŋôn	-kaɲ < 'hand'	kaɲ kape (5 + 1)	kaɲ karey (5 + 2)	kaɲ kauni (5 + 3)	kaɲ kaoŋon (5 + 4)	tɔ́mɔ̀n
Eastern, Lotuxo-Teso, Teso-Turkana, Turkana	Karamojong (Dodotho) (1)	ɲípéí	ŋíááréí	ŋúúní	ŋóómwán	ŋííkan (< hand)	ŋíkan ka péí (5 + 1)	ŋíkan ka áréí (5 + 2)	ŋíkan ka úní (5 + 3)	ŋíkan ko ómwán (5 + 4)	ŋítomón
Eastern, Lotuxo-Teso, Teso-Turkana, Turkana	Karamojong (2)	ɛpei	ŋiarei	ŋiuni	ŋiomwɔn	ŋikan < hand	ŋíkàn kà-pei (5 + 1)	ŋíkàn kà-arei (5 + 2)	ŋíkàn kà-uni (5 + 3)	ŋíkàn kà-omwɔn (5 + 4)	ŋítɔ̀mɔ́n
Eastern, Lotuxo-Teso, Teso-Turkana, Turkana	Nyangatom	a-péy ̀	ŋa-áréy ̀	ŋa-uní ̀	ŋa-omwɔn ̀	ŋa-kànɪ (litː hand)	ŋa-kanɪ̀ ka-pey (5 + 1)	ŋa-kanɪ̀ ka-arey (5 + 2)	ŋa-kanɪ ka-uni (5 + 3)	ŋa-kanɪ ka-omwɔn (5 + 4)	ŋa-tɔ̀mɔn
Eastern, Lotuxo-Teso, Teso-Turkana, Turkana	Toposa	péì	áréì	ʊ́nì	ɔ́ŋwɔ́n	kànì̥ < hand	kànì̥ kà-péì (5 + 1)	kànì̥ kà-àréì (5 + 2)	kànì̥ kà-ʊ́ní (5 + 3)	kànì̥ kà-ɔ́ŋwɔ́n (5 + 4)	tɔ̀mɔ́ní̥
Eastern, Lotuxo-Teso, Teso-Turkana, Turkana	Turkana	a-péy ̀	ŋa-áréy ̀	ŋa-úní ̀	ŋa-ómwɔ̀n ̀	ŋa-kànɪ̥ < hand	ŋa-kanɪ ka-péy (5 + 1)	ŋa-kanɪ ka-áréy (5 + 2)	ŋa-kanɪ ka-úní (5 + 3)	ŋa-kanɪ ka-ómwɔ̀n (5 + 4)	ŋa-tɔ̀mɔn
Southern, Kalenjin, Elgon	Kupsabiny (Sebei)	aɡeenɡe [akɛ́ːŋkɛ]	äyëëny [ɑréːɲ]	sömök [sómok]	anɡʼwan [aŋwán]	müüt [múːt]	müüt äk aɡeenɡe [múːt ɑk akɛ́ːŋkɛ]	müüt äk äyëëny (5 + 2)	müüt äk sömök (5 + 3)	müüt äk anɡʼwan (5 + 4)	taman [támán]
Southern, Kalenjin, Elgon	Sabaot (Koony dialect)	akeenke [aɡɛ́ːŋɡɛ]	āyēēnɡʼ [ɑyéːŋ]	sōmōk [sómok]	anɡʼwan [aŋwán]	mūūt / muut [múːt]	lo [lɑ]	tisab [tɪ́sap]	sisiit [sɪsɪ́ːt]	sokool [sɑ́kɑːl]	taman [támán]
Southern, Kalenjin, Nandi-Markweta, Markweta	Cherang'any	àkɛ́ɛ́ŋkɛ̀	ʌ́yíín	sómòk	áŋwaan	múút	lɔ̀	tɪsáp	sìsít	sʌ́ɡʌ́l	támán
Southern, Kalenjin, Nandi-Markweta, Markweta	Endo (Marakwet)	ɒ́kɔ́ːŋɔ	ərèːɲ	sómók	ɒ́ŋwɒ̀n	mùːt	lɔ́	tɪ́sɔ́p	sisíːt	sɔkɔ̀ːl	tɒmɒn
Southern, Kalenjin, Nandi-Markweta, Nandi	Keiyo	àkɛ́ŋɡɛ̂ / àɛ́ŋɡɛ̂	aɛ́ːŋ /aɛ́ːɲ	sɔ̀mɔ̂k	àŋwàn	mʊ́ːt	lɔ̂	tɪ̀sâp	sɪ̀sɪ́ːt	sɔ́kɔ́ːl	támán
Southern, Kalenjin, Nandi-Markweta, Nandi	Tugen	àɣééɲɡé	àééɲ	sómók	àɲwán	múút	ló	tísáp	sìsíít	sóɣóòl	tàmán
Southern, Kalenjin, Okiek	Akie (Okiek)	akɛɛnkɛ	ayen	somok	aŋwàn	mʊ́ʊ́t	ílɛ	nápíʃana	ísíêt	náúdo	taman
Southern, Kalenjin, Pokot	Pökoot (Suk)	àkɔ́ɔ́ŋkɔ̀	oɣë̀ë̀ŋ / òdë̀ë̀ŋ	sä́mä́k	àŋwân	múut	múut ŋɡɔ́ àkɔ́ɔ́ŋɔ̀ (5 + 1)	múut ŋɡɔ́ òdë̀ë̀ŋ (5 + 2)	múut ŋɡɔ́ sä́mä́k (5 + 3)	múut ŋɡɔ́ àŋwân (5 + 4)	támàn
Southern, Tatoga	Asimjeeg Datooga (1)	àkàlɛːlɛ̀ː / ák / (àqàlɛːlɛ̀ː)	íjèɲ	sàmòɡw	àŋwàn	mùːt	lá	ísːpò	sìs	ʃàɡàʃ	dàmàn
Southern, Tatoga	Datooga (2)	ɑ̀ɡi	íiyèeɲɑ	sɑ́mɑ̀ɡu	ɑ́ŋwɑ́n	mʊ̀ʊt	lɑ́	íispɑ̀	sís	ʃɑ́ɡɛ̀ɛʃ	dɑ̀mɑ́nɑ́mʊ́qʊ̀ʊʃ
Southern, Tatoga	Datooga (3)	ʔàɡi	íyèeɲa	sàmàɡu	ʔàŋwàn	mùuti ~ bánàakta mùuti	làh	ìsbà ~ isbwà	sìss ~ sìs	ʃàɡèeʃʃ ~ ʃàɡèeʃ	dàmáná múqùuʃ
Western, Dinka-Nuer, Dinka	Dinka Agaar	ʈɔ́k	rɔ́ʷ	dʲák	ŋʊ̀ʷân	ðíɟ	ðɛ̀ʈem	ðɜ̀rʊ́ʷ	bɛ̀ʈ	ðɔ̀ŋʊ́ʷàn	t̪íʲàːr
Western, Dinka-Nuer, Dinka	Dinka Padang	tò̤k	ròw	dyá̤k	ŋwán	d̪yì̤c	d̪ètém	d̪ɔ̀rɔ́w	bɛ̤́t	d̪ɔ̀ŋwán	t̪yɛ́ɛ̀r
Western, Dinka-Nuer, Nuer	Nuer (1)	kɛ̀ːl	rɜ̀ʷ	dɪʲɔ̂k	ŋʊ́ʷǎn	ðɪ́ʲɛ̀ɟ	bakɛ̀l (5 + 1)	bàraʷ (5 + 2)	bɛ̀dak (5 + 3)	bɜ̀ŋʊ́ʷǎn (5 + 4)	wɜ́ːl
Western, Dinka-Nuer, Nuer	Nuer (2)	kɛ́ɛ̀l	rɛ̌w	dyɔ̌k	ŋwán	d̪yè̤c	bʌ̤́kɛ̀l (5 + 1)	bʌ̤rɔ̀w (5 + 2)	bʌ̤̀dá̤k (5 + 3)	bʌ̤́ŋwàn (5 + 4)	wá̤l
Western, Luo, Northern, Anuak	Anuak(Anyua) (1)	àcíɛ̀l	àríyɔ̀	àdʌ́k	àŋwɛ́ɛ́n	àbíc	àbícìɛ̀l (5 + 1)	àbíríyɔ̀ (5 + 2)	àbárà (5 + 2)	àbíŋwɛ̀ɛ̀n (5 + 4)	àpár
Western, Luo, Northern, Anuak	Anuak (2)	aciel / acíɛ̀l	ariio̤ / aríɪàw	ada̤k / adʌ́ɡ	aŋween / aŋwɛ́ɛn	abi̤i̤c / abíiɟ	abi̤ciel / abícíɛ̀l (5 + 1)	abi̤riio̤ /abíríɪàw (5 + 2)	aba̤ra / abʌ́rʌ́ (5 + 3)	abi̤ŋween / abíŋwɛ̀ɛn (5 + 4)	apaar / apáar
Western, Luo, Northern, Bor	Belanda Bor	ákɛɛ̂l	arɛ̂w	àdéɡ	àŋwɛ́n	àbíc	àbíc kúkɛ́l (5 + 1)	àbíc kúrɛ̂w (5 + 2)	àbíc kùdēēk (5 + 3)	àbíc kúŋwɛ̂n (5 + 4)	áfaàr
Western, Luo, Northern, Jur	Luwo	áciɛ̄lɔ́	á̟riɔ̄w	á̟dá̟ɡ	áŋwɛ̄ːn	àbī̟ːj	ábíciɛ̄l (5 + 1)	ábɛ́riɔ̄w (5 + 2)	á̟bɛ̟́dā̟ɡ (5 + 3)	ábɛ́ŋwɛ̄ːn (5 + 4)	āpāːr
Western, Luo, Northern, Mabaan-Burun, Burun	Burun (Mayak)	kɛɛl / kɛ̀ɛl	rɛɛ / rɛ̄	ɖʌk /ɖʌ̄k	ŋan / ŋān	d̪oc / dōoc	ɖowk /ɖɔ́ùk	ŋat̪ukɛl / ŋàtúkɛ́l	ŋunu / ŋɔ̀nʊ́	ɟucukɛl / ɲùcúkɛ́l	caac / cáac
Western, Luo, Northern, Mabaan-Burun, Mabaan	Mabaan	cyɛ́ɛlɔ̀	yɛ́ɛwɔ̀	ɗɔ́ɔ́ɡɔ́	ŋáánɔ̀	d̪ɔ́ɔ́yɔ̀	d̪ɔ́ɔ́yɔ̀ wílin nè cyɛ́ɛlɔ̀ (5 + 1)	d̪ɔ́ɔ́yɔ̀ wítkɛ̀n nè yɛ́ɛwɔ̀ (5 + 2)	d̪ɔ́ɔ́yɔ̀ wítkɛ̀n nè ɗɔ́ɔ́ɡɔ́ (5 + 3)	d̪ɔ́ɔ́yɔ̀ wítkɛ̀n nè ŋáánɔ̀ (5 + 4)	ínyáákkɛ̀n (lit: both hands)
Western, Luo, Northern, Shilluk	Shilluk	àkjɛ̀l	áɾjɛ̀w	ádə̀k	áŋwɛ̀n	ábîc	ábîkjɛ̀l (5 + 1)	abìɾjɛ̀w (5 + 2)	àbîdèk (5 + 3)	ábîŋwɛ̀n (5 + 4)	pjáár
Western, Luo, Northern, Thuri	Thuri	ácîel	aríòw	ádeèk	àŋwɛɛ̀n	àbííc	abícbícèl (5 + 1)	àbícbə́riə́ɔ̀w (5 + 2)	àbícbídèk (5 + 3)	àbíc bə́ŋwɛ́ɛn (5 + 4)	ápaàr
Western, Luo, Northern, Unclassified	Päri (Lokoro) (1)	ácɛ̀lɔ́	árìyɔ́	ádòɡó	áŋwɛ̀nɔ́	ábìd͡ʒɔ́	àbícɛ̀lɔ́ (5 + 1)	àbírìyɔ́ (5 + 2)	ábʌ̄rà (5 + 3)	ábúŋwɛ̀nɔ́ (5 + 4)	ápàr
Western, Luo, Northern, Unclassified	Päri (Lokoro) (2)	acyelo, took	aryo, ireek	adöɡo, ɡala	aŋweno	abijo, kunat	abicyelo (5 + 1), bukel	abiryo (5 + 2), buryo	abidö̈ɡo, aböra (5 + 3), bodök	abuŋweno (5 + 4), buŋwan	apar
Western, Luo, Southern, Adhola	Adhola (1)	ɑ́cêr	ɑ́rîo	ɑ́dêːk	ɑ́ŋʷên	ɑ́bîːc	ɑ̀ᵘcèr (5 + 1)	ɑ̀bírîo (5 + 2)	ɑ́bôːrò (5 + 3)	ɑ̀búŋʷèn (5 + 4)	ɑ́pɑ̂ːr
Western, Luo, Southern, Adhola	Adhola (2)	àcíɛl	àríó	àdeék	àŋwɛɛ̂n	àbîc	àwúciɛ̄l (5 + 1)	àbíirò (5 + 2)	àbɔ́ɔ̀rò (5 + 3)	àbúŋwɛ́n (5 + 4)	ápāar
Western, Luo, Southern, Kumam	Kumam	ɑ̀cɛ́l	ɑ̀ré	ɑ̀dēk	òŋwɔ́n	kɑ̄ɲ	kɑ́ɲ ɑ̀pé (5 + 1)	kɑ̄ɲ ɑ̀ré (5 + 2)	kɑ̄ɲ ɑ̀wūní (5 + 3)	kɑ̄ɲ ɑ̀ŋɔ́n (5 + 4)	tɔ̄mɔ́n
Western, Luo, Southern, Luo-Acholi, Alur-Acholi, Alur	Alur	àcìɛ̄l	àríɔ̀	àdék	àŋùén	àbîc	àbúcìɛ̀l (5+ 1)	àbírɔ́ (5+ 2)	àboônà (5+ 3)	àbúŋwɛ̄ɛ̄n (5+ 4)	àpáàr
Western, Luo, Southern, Luo-Acholi, Alur-Acholi, Labwor	Acholi (Labwor)	àcíèl	àríò	àdék	àŋwɛ̂n	àbîc	àbícíèl (5 + 1)	àbíìrɔ́ (5 + 2)	àboôrà (5 + 3)	àbúŋwɛ́n (5 + 4)	àpáàr
Western, Luo, Southern, Luo-Acholi, Alur-Acholi, Acholi	Acholi	àcɛ̂l	àryɔ̂	àdêk	àŋwɛ̂n	àbîc	àbícɛ̀l (5 + 1)	àbíryɔ̀ (5 + 2)	àbórò (5 + 3)??	àbóŋwɛ̀n (5 + 4)	àpâr
Western, Luo, Southern, Luo-Acholi, Luo	Dholuo	àcìɛ̄l	àríɔ̀	àdék	àŋùén	àbîc	àúcìɛ̀l (5 + 1)	àbíríɔ̀ (5 + 2)	àborô	ɔ́cíkɔ̀	àpáàr

== See also ==
- Nilotic peoples
- Paranilotic languages
- Nilo-Saharan languages
- Kir–Abbaian languages
- Proto-Nilotic reconstructions (Wiktionary)
