= Western Nilotic languages =

Subgroup of the Nilotic language family

Western Nilotic
- Geographic distribution: southwestern Ethiopia, South Sudan, Sudan, northeastern Congo (DRC), northern and eastern Uganda, southwestern Kenya, northern Tanzania
- Linguistic classification: Nilo-Saharan?: Eastern Sudanic?; Southern Eastern?; Nilotic; Western Nilotic
- Subdivisions: Dinka–Nuer; Luo; Burun

Language codes
- Glottolog: west2493

The Western Nilotic languages are one of the three primary branches of the Nilotic languages, along with the Eastern Nilotic languages and Southern Nilotic languages, themselves belonging to the Eastern Sudanic subfamily of Nilo-Saharan. The about 22 (SIL estimate) Western Nilotic languages are spoken in an area ranging from southwestern Ethiopia and South Sudan via northeastern Democratic Republic of the Congo and northern Uganda to southwestern Kenya (with one of the Luo languages extending into northern Tanzania).

== History ==
According to historian Christopher Ehret, the homeland of proto-Western Nilotic was within the southern Blue Nile State in 2000 BCE. It then diverged into proto-Burun and "proto-Jii" (Dinka–Nuer and Luo). Proto-Burun remained in its current lands while Proto-Jii spread to the southwest, where it eventually broke up into proto-Dinka–Nuer and Proto-Luo, by the end of the second millennium or early last millennium B.C.

== Families ==
The Western Nilotic languages are Nilotic languages, which themselves are part of the Kir–Abbaian and Eastern Sudan subfamilies of the much larger Nilo-Saharan language family.

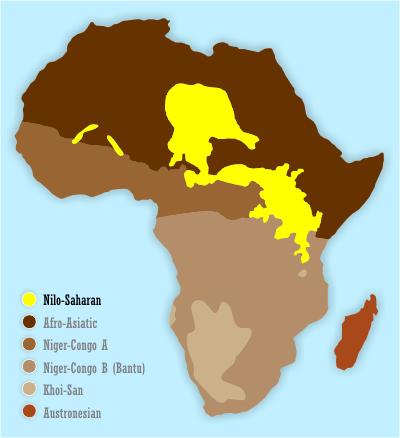
The much larger Nilo-Saharan languages, which Western Nilotic is part of.

== Subdivisions ==
Western Nilotic is divided into three main clusters: Dinka–Nuer, Luo and Burun. The Luo Languages are languages spoken by the Luo peoples. They include but are not fully limited to, Shilluk, Luwo, Thuri, Belanda Bor, Burun, Päri, Anuak, and Southern Luo. The Luo languages are the most spoken of the three groupings.

- Dinka–Nuer: Nuer–Reel (Atuot), Dinka (Thuongjang)
- Luo: Shilluk, Luwo (Jur), Thuri, Belanda Bor, Päri, Anuak, Southern Luo
- Burun: Northern and Southern Burun

== See also ==
- Eastern Nilotic languages
- Southern Nilotic languages
- Luo languages
- Nilotic languages
