= List of Kenyan musicians =

This is a list of Kenyan musicians and musical groups.

== A ==
- Akothee
- Avril
- Ayub Ogada

== B ==
- Bensoul
- Bien-Aimé Baraza
- Bahati

== C ==
- Cece Sagini

== D ==
- Daddy Owen
- Daudi Kabaka
- David Mathenge
- DJ Fita

== E ==
- E-Sir
- Elani
- Eric Wainaina

== F ==
- Fadhili William
- Fundi Konde

== G ==
- George Ramogi
- Gloria Muliro

== H ==
- Harry Kimani

== J ==
- Jabali Afrika
- Jason Dunford
- Jimwat
- Jua Cali

== K ==
- Kavirondo
- Khaligraph Jones
- King Kaka
- Kleptomaniax

== M ==
- Mejja
- Mercy Myra
- Michael Bundi
- Mighty King Kong
- Monski
- Muroki
- Musa Juma

== N ==
- Nadia Mukami
- Naiboi
- Nameless
- Necessary Noize
- Nikita Kering
- Nonini
- Nyashinski

== O ==
- Okatch Biggy
- Otile Brown

== P ==
- Prince Indah
- Princess Jully

== R ==
- Redsan
- Roger Whittaker

== S ==
- Sanaipei Tande
- Sauti Sol
- Size 8
- Stella Mwangi

== T ==
- Tony Nyadundo

== W ==
- Wahu
- Wakadinali
- Wanyika bands, including Simba Wanyika and its offshoots
- Willy Paul
- Wyre
