= List of Kenyan artists =

This is a list of notable Kenyan artists, includes artists of various genres, who are notable and are either born in Kenya, of Kenyan descent or who produce works that are primarily about Kenya.

== Architects ==
- Emma Miloyo (born 1981) - partner in Design Source in Nairobi; first woman to chair the Architectural Association of Kenya (AAK) Architects' Chapter

== Visual artists / photographers ==
- Mohamed Amin (born 1943), photojournalist
- Michael Armitage (born 1984), visual artist
- Jim Chuchu (born 1982), film director, photographer, singer-songwriter and visual artist
- Cyrus Kabiru (born 1984), visual artist
- Rosemary Karuga (born 1928-2021) visual artist
- Miriam Syowia Kyambi (born 1979), multimedia artist, filmmaker, curator
- Osborne Macharia (born 1986)
- Wangari Mathenge (born 1973), contemporary visual artist
- Barbara Minishi, filmmaker, fashion photographer and art director
- Boniface Mwangi (born 1983), photojournalist
- Kawira Mwirichia (born 1986), curator
- Wangechi Mutu (born 1972), visual artist
- Kaloki Nyamai (born 1985), visual artist
- Jimmy Ogonga, multimedia artist
- Dickens Otieno (Born 1979), visual artist
- Christopher Oywecha, abstract expressionist painter

== Musicians ==
- Akothee (born 1980) - singer and dancer
- Jua Cali (born 1979) - genge rapper, singer/composer
- King Kaka (born 1987) - rapper/songwriter/businessman
- Harry Kimani (born 1982) - singer/songwriter
- Mighty King Kong (1973–2007) - singer/songwriter
- Monski (born 1994) - rapper/songwriter
- Stella Mwangi (born 1986) - rapper/songwriter
- Nonini (born 1982) - singer/songwriter
- Obinna - singer/songwriter
- Wangechi (born 1994) - singer/songwriter
- Evelyn Wanjiru (born 1990) gospel singer, music director and songwriter
- Toxic Lyrikali-(born 1993) singer/songwriter

== Performing artists ==
- Sarah Hassan (born 1988)
- Henrie Mutuku (born 1978)
- Lizz Njagah
