= List of Luo Kenyans =

This is a list of some notable Luo Kenyans, an ethnic group and nation associated with Kenya, living or dead. Some persons may not be listed here, but are listed in other related articles, shown under the See also section.

This is a list of people of Luo Descent and for those otherwise perceived as Luos; either in birth or adoption. Only those meeting notability criteria as shown by having an article here, are included, unless their position makes it obvious that they are unquestionably qualified for one.

This list is incomplete; you can help by expanding it.

== Actors ==
- Irene Ayimba, Kenyan television actress
- Lupita Nyong'o, winner of Academy Award for Best Supporting Actress and filmmaker (Kenyan/Mexican)
- Sidede Onyulo, Kenyan actor

== Models ==
- Gaylyne Ayugi, model & Miss Universe Kenya 2014

== Musicians ==
- Owuor Arunga, jazz trumpeter
- Okatch Biggy, musician
- Musa Juma, musician
- Ayub Ogada, singer, composer and performer on the nyatiti
- Daniel Owino Misiani, Tanzanian musician from Mara Region
- PinkPantheress, English singer and record producer
- Toxic Lyrikali, musician

== Politicians ==
- Miguna Miguna, Kenyan politician
- Achieng Oneko, Kenyan independence freedom fighter and politician
- Anyang' Nyong'o, Kenyan politician
- Betty Oyella Bigombe, Ugandan politician
- Dalmas Otieno, Kenyan politician
- James Orengo, Senate Member in Kenya
- Jaramogi Oginga Odinga, first Vice President of independent Kenya
- Oburu Odinga, former Kenyan Minister and Member of Kenyan Senate
- Otieno Kajwang, Kenyan politician
- Raila Odinga, second Prime Minister of Kenya
- Raphael Tuju, Kenyan politician
- Robert Ouko, Kenyan Foreign Minister
- Tom Mboya, Kenyan politician, Pan-Africanist
- Ochola Ogaye Mak'Anyengo, Kenyan freedom fighter, trade unionist, Member of Parliament, Assistant Cabinet Minister
- Olara Otunnu, Ugandan politician, diploma and lawyer

== Sports people ==
- Congestina Achieng, female boxer
- David Ochieng, footballer
- Frank Odhiambo, footballer
- Johnny Oduya, ice hockey defenseman for the Chicago Blackhawks
- Divock Okoth Origi, Belgian footballer, son of Kenyan footballer Mike Origi (Belgian)
- Dennis Oliech, footballer
- David Owino, footballer

== Academics ==
- Barack Obama Sr., economist, Harvard University graduate, father of previous U.S. President Barack Obama
- Henry Odera Oruka, philosopher
- Thomas R. Odhiambo, founder of International Centre of Insect Physiology and Ecology
- Phoebe Okowa, international law scholar, first Kenyan elected to the International Court of Justice
- David Wasawo, University of Oxford trained zoologist, first African Deputy Principal of Makerere University College and Nairobi University College

== Writers ==
- Grace Ogot, educationist
- Opiyo Oloya, Ugandan educator and author
- Yvonne Adhiambo Owuor, author

== See also ==
- Kenyans
- Kenyan actors
