= Luo peoples =

Ethnolinguistic Nilotic groups inhabit to central and Northeastern Africa

Luo
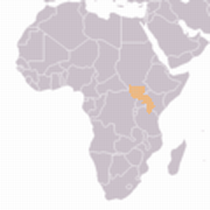
- Luo location in East Africa

Total population
- 18,596,000

Regions with significant populations
- East Africa: Ethiopia, Kenya, Uganda, Tanzania, South Sudan, Congo (DRC)

Religion
- Christianity; Traditional religions; Islam

Related ethnic groups
- Other Nilotic peoples Especially Atuot, Burun, Dinka, Jumjum, and Nuer

A map of some of the Luo peoples

The Luo (also spelled Lwo) are several ethnically and linguistically related Nilotic ethnic groups that inhabit an area ranging from South Sudan and western Ethiopia, Somalia through Northern and Eastern Uganda and eastern Congo (DRC), into western Kenya, and the Mara Region of Tanzania. Their Luo languages belong to the western branch of the Nilotic language family.

The Luo groups in South Sudan include the Shilluk, Anuak, Pari, Acholi, Balanda Boor, Thuri and Luwo. Those in Uganda include the Alur, Acholi, Jonam and Padhola. The ones in Kenya and Tanzania are the Joluo (also called Luo in Kenyan English).

The Joluo and their language Dholuo are also known as the "Luo proper" by Kenya based observers, even though their dialect has more Bantu loan words than the rest. The level of historical separation between these groups is estimated at eight centuries. Dispersion from an alleged Nilotic core region in South Sudan is presumed to have been triggered by the turmoil of the Muslim conquest of Sudan. The migration of individual groups over the last few centuries can to some extent be traced in the respective group's oral history.

== Origins in Sudan ==
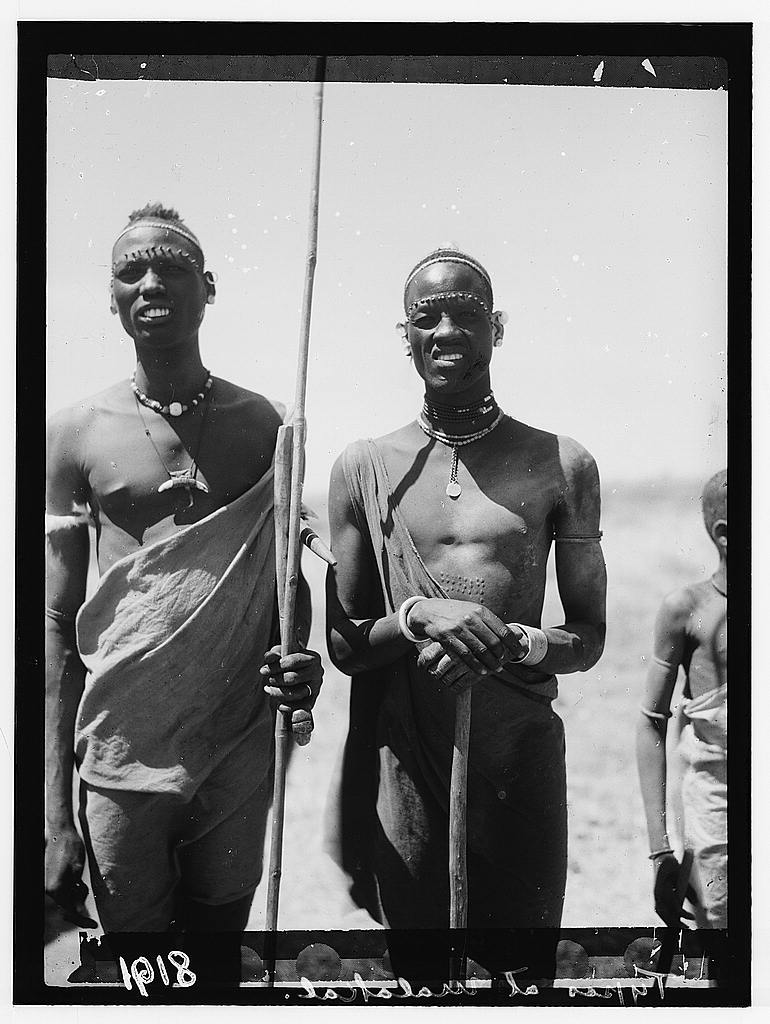
Shilluk men in South Sudan

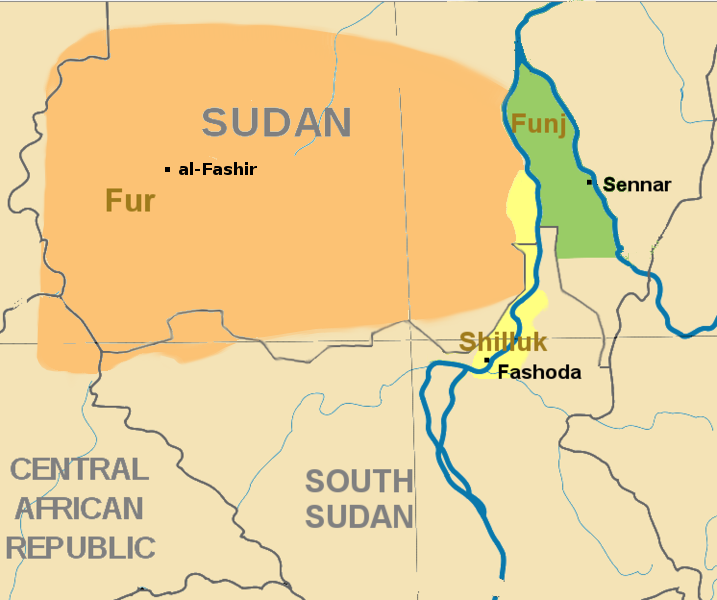
Shilluk Kingdom (yellow) c. 1800

The Luo are part of the Nilotic group of people. The Nilotes had separated from the other members of the East Sudanic family by about the 3rd millennium BC. Within Nilotic, Luo forms part of the Western group.

Within Luo, a Northern and a Southern group is distinguished. Dholuo is part of the Southern Luo group. Northern Luo is mostly spoken in South Sudan, while Southern Luo groups migrated south from the Bahr el Ghazal area in the early centuries of the second millennium AD (about eight hundred years ago).

A further division within the Northern Luo is recorded in a "widespread tradition" in Luo oral history: the foundational figure of the Shilluk (or Chollo) nation was a chief named Nyikango, dated to about the mid-15th century. After a quarrel with his brother, he moved northward along the Nile and established a feudal society. The Pari people descend from the group that rejected Nyikango.

== Ethiopia ==
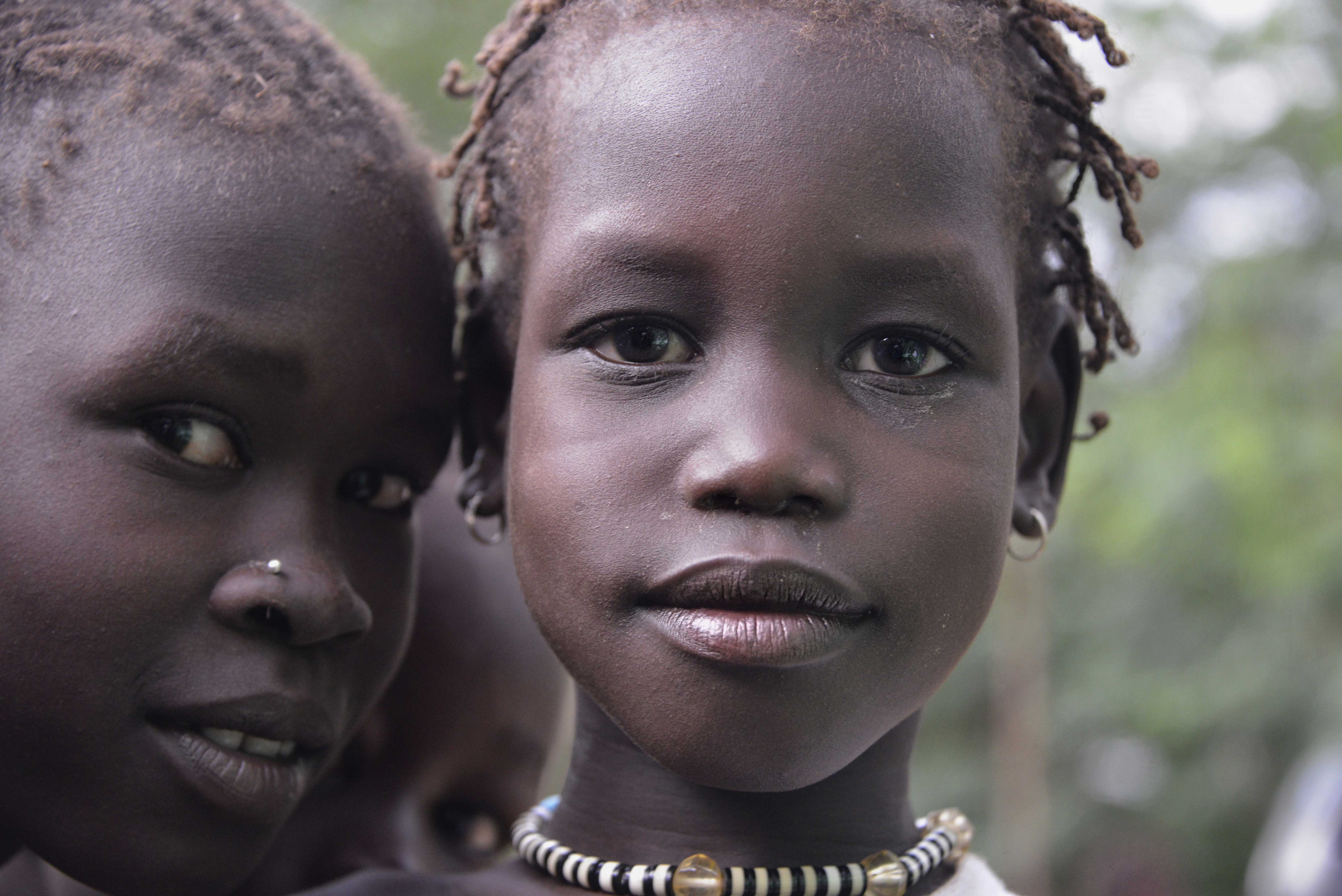
Anuak girls in Dimma, Ethiopia

The Anuak are a Luo people whose villages are scattered along the banks and rivers of the southwestern area of Ethiopia, with others living directly across the border in South Sudan. The name of these people is also spelled Anyuak, Agnwak, and Anywaa. The Anuak of South Sudan lives in a grassy region that is flat and virtually treeless. During the rainy season, this area floods, so that much of it becomes swampland with various channels of deep water running through it.

The Anuak who live in the lowlands of Gambela are Luo people. These have accused the current Ethiopian government of encroachment. The government's oppression has affected the Anuak's access to education, health care, and other basic services, as well as limiting opportunities for the development of the area.

The Acholi also spelt Acoli, another Luo people in South Sudan, occupy what is now called Magwi County in Eastern Equatorial State. They border the Uganda Acoli of Northern Uganda. The South Sudan Acholi numbered about 10,000 on the 2008 population Census.

== Uganda ==
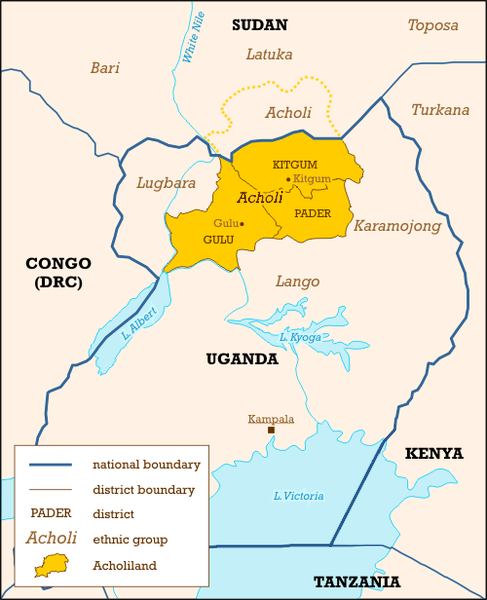
Acholiland in Uganda

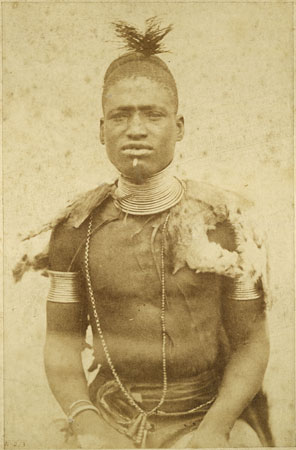
Acholi man in South Sudan

In the 1500s, a small group of Luo known as the Biito-Luo (Paluo), led by Labongo encountered Bantu-speaking peoples living in the area of Bunyoro. These Luo settled with the Bantu and established the Babiito dynasty, replacing the Bachwezi dynasty of the Empire of Kitara. According to the legends, Isingoma Mpuga Rukidi (Grandson to Labongo), the first in the line of the Babiito kings of Bunyoro-Kitara, was the twin brother of Kato Kimera, the first king of Buganda. These Luo were assimilated into the Bantu's society and lost their language and culture.

Later in the 18th century, other Luo-speaking people moved to the area that encompasses present-day South Sudan, Northern Uganda, and North-Eastern Congo (DRC) – forming the Alur, Jonam and Acholi.

Between the middle of the 16th century and the beginning of the 17th century, some Luo groups proceeded eastwards. One group called Padhola (or Jopadhola - people of Adhola), led by a chief called Adhola, settled in Budama in Eastern Uganda. They settled in a thickly forested area as a defence against attacks from Bantu neighbours who had already settled there. This self-imposed isolation helped them maintain their language and culture amidst Bantu and Ateker communities.

Those who went further a field were the Jo k'Ajok and Jo k'Owiny. The Ajok Luo moved deeper into the Kavirondo Gulf; their descendants are the present-day Jo Kisumo and Jo Karachuonyo amongst others. Jo k'Owiny occupied an area near Got Ramogi or Ramogi hill in Alego of Siaya district. The Owiny's ruins are still identifiable to this day at Bungu Owiny near Lake Kanyaboli.

The other notable Luo group is the Omolo Luo who inhabited Ugenya and Gem areas of Siaya district. The last immigrants were the Jo Kager, who are related to the Omollo Luo. Their leader Ochieng Waljak Ger used his advanced military skill to drive away the Omiya or Bantu groups, who were then living in present-day Ugenya around 1750AD.

== Kenya and Tanzania ==
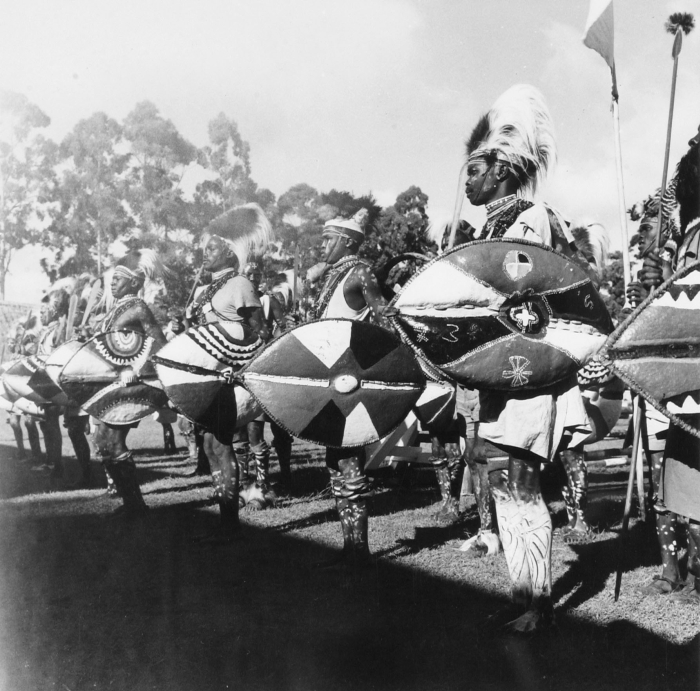
Luo dancers in Eldoret, Kenya

Between about 1500 and 1800, other Luo groups crossed into present-day Kenya and eventually into present-day Tanzania. They inhabited the area on the banks of Lake Victoria. According to the Joluo, a warrior chief named Ramogi Ajwang led them into present-day Kenya about 500 years ago.

As in Uganda, some non-Luo people in Kenya have adopted Luo languages. A majority of the Bantu Suba people in Kenya speak Dholuo as a first language and have largely been assimilated.

The Luo in Kenya, who call themselves Joluo ("people of Luo"), are the fourth largest community in Kenya after the Kikuyu, Luhya and Kalenjin. In 2017 their population was estimated to be 6.1 million. In Tanzania they numbered (in 2010) an estimated 1,980,000 . The Luo in Kenya and Tanzania call their language Dholuo, which is mutually intelligible (to varying degrees) with the languages of the Alur, Acoli, and Padhola of Uganda, South Sudan and Jo Nam or Alur of Congo.

The Luo (or Joluo) are traditional fishermen and practice fishing as their main economic activity. Other cultural activities included wrestling (yii or dhao) kwath for the young boys aged 13 to 18 in their age sets. Their main rivals in the 18th century were the Lango, the Highland Nilotes, who traditionally engaged them in fierce bloody battles, most of which emanated from the stealing of their livestock.

The Luo people of Kenya are nilotes and are related to the Nilotic people. The Luo people of Kenya are the fourth largest community in Kenya after the Kikuyu and, together with their brethren in Tanzania, form the largest single ethnic group in East Africa.

This includes peoples who share Luo ancestry and/or speak a Luo language.

- Acholi also spelled Acoli (Uganda, South Sudan, Kenya)
- Alur (Uganda and DRC)
- Anuak (Ethiopia and South Sudan)
- Blanda Boore (South Sudan)
- Jopadhola (Uganda)
- Jumjum (South Sudan)
- Jur Beli (South Sudan)
- Joluo (Kenya and Tanzania)
- Luwo (South Sudan)
- Pari (South Sudan)
- Shilluk (South Sudan)
- Thuri (South Sudan)
- Balanda Boor (South Sudan)
- Cope/Paluo people (Uganda)

== Notable Luo people ==
- Aamito Lagum, Ugandan international fashion model and winner of the first Africa's Next Top Model
- Achieng Oneko, independence freedom fighter and politician (Kenya)
- Adongo Agada Cham, 23rd King of the Anuak Nyiudola Royal Dynasty of Sudan and Ethiopia
- Ayub Ogada, singer, composer, and performer on the nyatiti, the Nilotic lyre of Kenya
- Barack Obama Sr., economist, Harvard University graduate, father of previous U.S. President Barack Obama (American)
- Barack Obama, 44th President of the United States, of Luo descent through his father, Barack Obama, Sr. (American)
- Bazilio Olara-Okello, former Senior Army officer, deceased (Ugandan) who led the rebellion that gave Tito Okello the Presidency
- Benjamin Onyango, lawyer (Kenya)
- Betty Oyella Bigombe, former Ugandan politician, a senior fellow at the U.S Institute of Peace
- Daniel Owino Misiani, Tanzanian musician from Mara Region, known as the "King of History" in Kenya; he was also known as "the grandfather of benga", which he pioneered.
- David Wasawo, University of Oxford trained Zoologist and the first African Deputy Principal of Makerere University College and Nairobi University College
- Dennis Oliech, football player, the most successful Kenyan footballer of his time
- Divock Okoth Origi, is a Belgian professional footballer who plays as a forward for Liverpool and the Belgium national team.
- Elijah Omolo Agar, first member of parliament for Karachuonyo Constituency, first independently elected member of parliament in Kenya,
- Erinayo Wilson Oryema, Uganda's first African Inspector General of Police, Minister of Land, Mineral, and Water Resources and Minister of Land, Housing and Physical Planning, (Uganda)
- Geoffrey Oryema, the son of Erinayo Wilson Oryema, who fled to France upon his father's assassination and became a world renowned singer, composer and performer.
- George Cosmas Adyebo, was a Ugandan politician and economist who was Prime Minister of Uganda from 1991 to 1994.
- George Ramogi, musician (Kenya)
- Grace Ogot, educationist (Kenya)
- Prof. Henry Odera Oruka - philosopher
- Henry Luke Orombi, Archbishop of the church of Uganda
- Hezekiah Oyugi, former principal secretary, internal security in Kenya
- James Orengo, Senate Member in Kenya and a Senior Counsel in Kenya. He is also known for the Second Liberation fight in Kenyan politics
- Janani Luwum, former Archbishop of the Church of Uganda
- Jaramogi Oginga Odinga - independence fighter, first Vice President of independent Kenya
- Johnny Oduya, a defenseman for the Chicago Blackhawks of the NHL
- Joseph Kony, leader of the Lord's Resistance Army, notorious rebel group in Uganda
- Kenny Athiu, professional footballer who plays as a forward for Cambodian Premier League club Visakha and the South Sudan national football team.
- Lam Akol, a South Sudanese politician, current leader of National Democratic Movement (NDM) party and former official in the Sudan People's Liberation Army (SPLA).
- Larry Madowo, journalist (Kenya)
- Lubwa p'Chong, was a Ugandan play write and author who was responsible for many publications in the 1970's and 1980's.
- Lupita Nyong'o, Oscar Award winning actress and filmmaker; graduate from The Yale School of Drama, (Kenyan/Mexican)
- Matthew Lukwiya, epidemiologist, died while fighting to eradicate the ebola pandemic in northern Uganda
- Miguna Miguna, Kenyan author, politician, columnist, and attorney. He is a barrister and a solicitor in Toronto, Canada.
- Musa Juma, musician (Kenya)
- Nuni Omot, Anunwa "Nuni" Omot (born October 3, 1994) is a South Sudanese professional basketball player for the Lakeland Magic of the NBA G League.
- Oburu Odinga, former Kenyan Minister and Member of East Africa Legislative Assembly
- Ochola Ogaye Mak'Anyengo, Kenyan Trade Unionist, freedom fighter and Politician
- Okatch Biggy, musician (Kenyan)
- Okot p'Bitek, poet and author of the Song of Lawino (Uganda)
- Olara Otunnu, former Under-Secretary-General of the United Nations and Special Representative for Children and Armed Conflict (Uganda)
- Oyay Deng Ajak, South Sudanese politician, formerly the Chief of Staff of the National Army, the Minister for Investment in the Cabinet of South Sudan and Minister of National Security.
- Pagan Amum, South Sudan's Chief Negotiator with Sudan on post independence issues, Minister for Peace and Comprehensive Peace Agreement (CPA) Implementation, prior to independence in 2011, and caretaker Minister of Peace in the first government post-independence
- Paul Lokech, was a Ugandan military General who served as a commander of the AMISON mission in Somalia and Deputy Inspector General of Police
- Phoebe Muga Asiyo, former parliamentarian of Karachuonyo Constituency, ambassador to the United Nations Development Fund for Women (UNIFEM), first female Luo Elder, first African Woman Senior Superintendent of Women's Prisons.
- Raila Odinga, second Prime Minister of Kenya, contested and lost in four presidential elections (2007, 2013, 2017, and 2022)
- Robert Ouko, Kenyan Foreign Minister, Assassinated in 1990
- Sunday Dech, a South Sudanese-Australian professional basketball player for the Adelaide 36ers (NBL) who led South Sudan to its first ever basketball world cup.
- Thomas R. Odhiambo, pre-eminent scientist, founder of International Centre of Insect Physiology and Ecology (Kenya)
- Tito Okello, former President of Uganda and Army Commander
- Thomas Joseph Odhiambo Mboya, Trade Unionist, Pan-Africanist and a Politician; assassinated in cold blood 1969 (Kenya)
- Tony Nyadundo, musician (Kenya)
- Yvonne Adhiambo Owuor, author (Kenya)

== See also ==
- History of Uganda
- Early history of Uganda
- History of East Africa
