= Bahati =

Bahati may refer to:

== Parliamentary constituencies ==
- Bahati Constituency, a constituency in Kenya
- Bahati (constituency), a constituency in Zambia

== Places ==
- Bahati, Nairobi, an estate of Nairobi, the capital of Kenya

== People ==
- Bahati Ali Abeid, Tanzanian politician
- David Bahati, Ugandan politician
- Olivier Bahati, Burundian footballer
- Rahsaan Bahati, American cyclist
- Bahati (singer), Kenyan singer
