= 2003 Kisima Music Awards =

Kenyan music awards

The 2003 Kisima Music Awards recognised and rewarded music talent in Kenya. The Kisima Music Awards ceremony was held on June 21, 2003 to coincide with Fête de la Musique. The awards were last given for the year of 1997. For 2003, they were held in a customised "Kisima Dome" at Carnivore. The award show was hosted by radio presenters Bernard Otieno and Pinky Ghelani.

Though he died in March 2003, hip-hop artist E-Sir won several categories and was given the award posthumously.

== Winners ==
Category	Winner
Afro Fusion/Benga/Gospel Artist of the Year	Shari Martin
Central Benga Artist of the Year	Kamande Wa Kioi
Song of the Year	E-Sir - Bumba Train
Best Female artist of the Year	Henrie Mutuku
Bango Artist/Group of the Year	Mzee Joseph Ngala
Contemporary Gospel Artist of the Year	Henrie Mutuku
Best Overall Group of the Year	Gidi Gidi Maji Maji
Best Male Artist of the Year	E-Sir
Fusion Artist/Group of the Year	Gidi Gidi Maji Maji
Hip hop Artist/Group of the Year	E-Sir
Eastern Benga Artist/Group of the Year	Katitu Boys Band
Most Promising Artist/Group of the Year	Suzzanna Owiyo
R&B Artist of the Year	Mercy Myra
Taarab Artist/Group of the Year	Nyota Ndogo
Best Music Video of the Year	Baby Don't Go, by Kunguru & Mr. Lenny
Western Benga Artist/Group of the Year	Princess Jully
Ragga Artist/Group of the Year	Mr. Googz & Vinnie Banton
Traditional Artist/Group of the Year	Bakulutu Africa
Best Music Producer of the Year	Lucas Bikedo (Ogopa Deejays)
Album of the Year	Nimefika, by E-Sir
