= Brookhouse School =

Independent British school in Nairobi

Coordinates: 1°20′46″S 36°45′54″E

Location
- Magadi Road, Langata; Nairobi; Kenya

Information
- Type: Independent day and boarding school
- Motto: Latin: Floreat Sapientia (Let Wisdom Flourish)
- Established: 1981; 45 years ago
- Director: John O'Connor
- Teaching staff: c. 108
- Grades: Pre-school through Year 13
- Age range: 2–19 years old
- Enrollment: 800 (approx)
- Education system: English National Curriculum
- Campus: Karen and Runda
- Campus type: Suburban
- Houses: Tsavo (yellow), Mara (blue), Samburu (green), Amboseli (red)
- Colors: Black, red and gold
- Mascot: Little Brookie
- Website: www.brookhouse.ac.ke

Brookhouse School (also known as Brookhouse International School) is an independent English curriculum co-educational day and boarding school that offers early years, preparatory and secondary schooling. The first and main campus is located in Karen, a suburb of Nairobi. The Runda Campus off Kiambu Road was opened in 2017.

== Academics ==
Brookhouse follows the National Curriculum for England and students take IGCSE and A-Level at 16+ and 18+, respectively. Students take examinations through both the Cambridge International Examinations (CIE) and Edexcel Boards.

== Curriculum ==
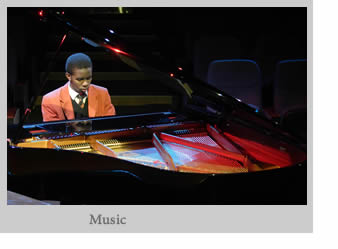
Music students

The school follows the National Curriculum for England system admitting students from 2yrs to 18 yrs. Brookhouse Schools also offers an international foundation year bridging programme in partnership with the Northern Consortium of UK Universities (NCUK).

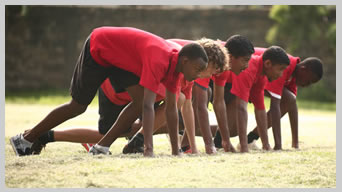
Athletics

== Reputation ==
The school was selected for review by the Good Schools Guide International and is a member of the G30 Schools. The school is fully accredited by the Council of International Schools (CIS) and the Independent Association of Preparatory Schools (IAPS).

== Alumni ==
The Brookhouse community (alumni and staff) includes:

- Dr. Louise Leakey, palaeontologist, educator and lecturer
- E-Sir (1981–2003), musician
- Eric Wainaina, musician and playwright
- Nikita Kering, musician
