= Muliro =

Muliro is an African surname. Notable people with the surname include:

- Gloria Muliro (born 1980), Kenyan Gospel musician and songwriter
- Masinde Muliro (1922–1992), Kenyan politician
