= Onyi Papa Jey =

Ohangla musician from Kenya

Onyi Papa Jey (real name Bernard Onyango Ranginya, born in 1982 in Kiyembe, Suba District) is an ohangla musician from Kenya.

Onyi Papa Jey started playing orutu while at primary school. He dropped from Tonga Secondary School after failing to pay the school fees. He joined Tony Nyadundo's band in 1999 and performed in 2002. Later he performed for a while with Nyamolo traditional dancers. He also led a band called Langasta Stars in Eldoret for one year. He then toured with Jack Nyadundo (elder brother of Tony Nyadundo) in Kenya and Tanzania. While in Tanzania he formed the Super Suba and Koleko Newface, bands. He left Tanzania after three years and rejoined the Nyamolo traditional dancers before going solo.

His career catapulted into national fame with the release of his debut album "Raila ODM" particularly its title track, which was devoted to Raila Odinga, the Orange Democratic Movement's presidential candidate in the 2007 Elections. Onyi Papa Jey is signed to the SoundAfrica label.

He was nominated for three categories at the 2008 Kisima Music Awards: Artist of the Year, Ethnic Fusion Artist, and Song of the Year ("Raila ODM"). However, he did not win any of these categories. He is a renowned musician with prowess in Ohangla, a traditional song native to the Luo community.

== Discography ==
Albums:

- Raila ODM
- Mapatano
- Nyar Maasai
- Ulanda Nango
- Mark Matunga
- Lok Pachi
