= Mugithi =

Kenyan music genre

Mugithi music is a form of music that originated from the Kikuyu people of Kenya but is also enjoyed by other ethnic groups within the country, as well as by non-Kenyans in regions with a large Kenyan diaspora, such as the United Kingdom.

It is typically performed by a single singer and accompanied by guitars (either acoustic or usually quite highly pitched electric guitars). Songs are exclusively in the Gikuyu language.

The music explores a wide range of subjects and includes a good degree of social commentary and occasional political messages.

The singers are known for adopting the style of Country music singers, who had an influence on the music's development in past decades. Singers like the lateSalim Junior have become household names. Mike Rua has had the advantage of collaborating with the king of Benga music Mike Omondi, also known as Prezidaa of Them Hunnies. Others like Mike Rua are prominent Kenyan Benga artists. The Mugithi artists have in recent times redone and recorded old kikuyu Benga music to appeal to modern audiences.

During a Mugithi performance, the audience typically forms a line and dances while moving around the venue. Mugithi is a common phenomenon in weddings, dowry events, local night clubs and other celebrations. The name Mugithi means "a train" hence the dancing style involving holding on to each other's hips wriggling as they go in circles. The first Mugithi song was a gospel song "Mugithi Uyu wa Matuini", translated from the English song "Glory Train".
