= DJ Fita =

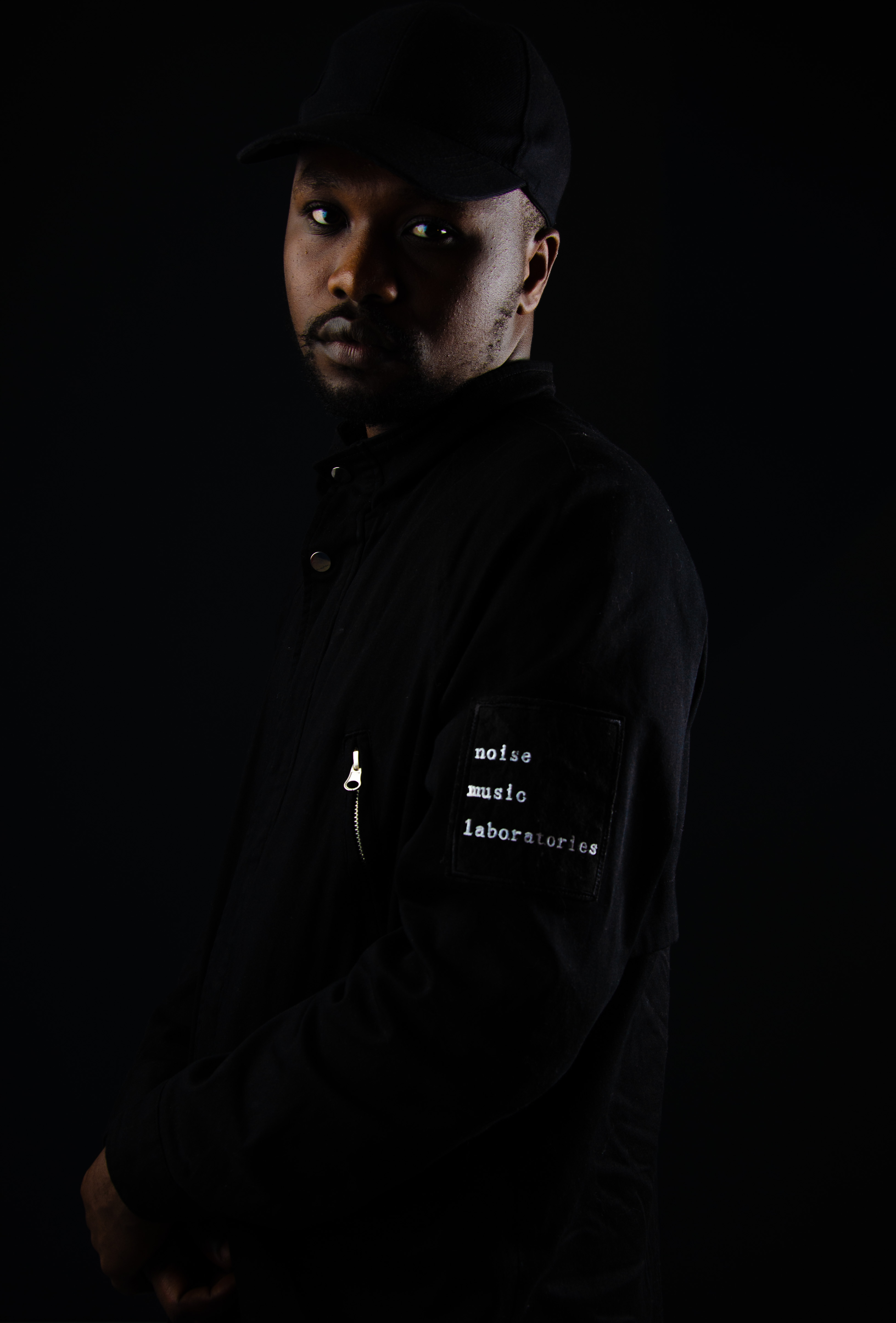

Background information
- Born: Kelvin Peter Wanjohi; 1994 (age 31–32); Thika
- Origin: Kenya
- Genres: Electronic, Afro House, RnB
- Occupations: DJ, record producer, music journalist, broadcaster
- Instruments: Digital audio workstation, Keyboard
- Years active: 2014–present
- Label: Sound Safari Records
- Website: djfita.com

Kelvin Peter Wanjohi (born 21 August 1994) professionally known as DJ Fita, is a Kenyan DJ, music producer and music journalist from Thika. He is best known for remixing Kenyan pop music to Afro House into upbeat electronic dance music. DJ Fita is also a member of Fitemba. He was nominated for the VJ of the Year 2015 during the annual Stylus DJ Awards and Alternative DJ of the Year 2022 at Cafe Ngoma Awards.

== Early life and education ==
DJ Fita was born in Makongeni Estate Thika. He graduated with a diploma in IT from Jomo Kenyatta University of Agriculture & Technology and a degree in Information Security & Forensics from KCA University.

== Career ==
DJ Fita uploaded an unofficial remix for Kookoo by Elani on SoundCloud in 2014. He subsequently joined EDM Kenya, a community-based website that promotes House music artists from Kenya.

In July 2016, DJ Fita released back to back remixes first releasing an official remix for "Doing It Right" by DJ Nruff on 11 July 2016. Shortly after, he participated in the Chemistry remix Challenge by Tetu Shani. The challenge featured 36 producers from around Kenya, making it one of the defining tracks of the Nu-Nairobi Movement and one of the biggest songs on Kenya's SoundCloud in 2016. DJ Fita's and producer Hendrick Sam's remixes of Chemistry were the first tracks to feature two consecutive weekends on The Undercover segment of Homeboyz Radio's Weekend Breakfast Show, hosted by Rae Kiragu.Hendrick Sam would later that December release Evolution EP through DJ Fita's Sound Safari label imprint.

On 27 January 2017, DJ Fita released a remix for Mungu Pekee by Nyashinski which was made available for free download on his SoundCloud account. The remix quickly gained traction in the club scene and was soon picked up by radio leading to an on-air radio interview on Homeboyz Radio in February.

In 2018, he was invited to play three major Kenyan Festivals, Africa Nouveau Festival, Ongea Summit 2018 and Earthdance Music Festival as well as going on his debut tour, Break It All Apart Tour. He performed with legendary Benga Music artist Makadem. Makadem & The Electric Bengaloo is an Afro-electronic live band that fuses Benga sounds of the Nyatiti with electronic dance music elements. During the shows, he changed his usual DJ set-up and instead performed live on Ableton Live and a launchpad. On 20 August 2018, DJ Fita released his debut official artist single which features Groove Awards nominee, Twist, supported by a 4-stop tour in Kenya and Kigali, Rwanda.

On 15 March 2019, DJ Fita appeared as the special guest on Adoveli Podcast season 3 episode 11. Later on the same day, a new Afro-tech track titled "jackals" by DJ Fita was given its first airplay on African Moves, Drums Radio, UK by DJ OneDown

=== 2020: Name of Love EP ===
In August 2020, DJ Fita announced his debut EP, Name of Love, which was released in November 2020. The first single, Ghetto Love, features Poly Joe and Hendrick Sam and was noted for varying from his previous work.

=== Fitemba ===
DJ Fita's first full-length project was with Brian Mahemba under the guise of "Fitemba" (a portmanteau of Fita and Mahemba.) The duo released their first EP, Untitled EP on 19 August 2016.

Fitemba teamed up with Hendrick Sam to produce a single on DJ Nruff's album which was released on iTunes on 25 September 2017. The track features Dan 'chizi' Aceda. Fitemba were listed on the Kenyan EDM Artists of 2017 by Internet Radio LionAfriq.

=== Redux ===
In an interview with Rae Kiragu and DJ Kafi on May 20, 2018, DJ Fita premiered a Dubstep remix for Ten Toes by Kenyan-Norwegian rapper STL. DJ Fita revealed that the remix was a collaborative project with DJ/Producer Pinch 254 for their new project called Redux.The remix has never been released to date

== Awards and nominations ==
Year	Award	Category	Result
2015	Stylus DJ Awards	VJ of The Year	Nominated
2022	Cafe Ngoma Awards	Alternative DJ of The Year	Nominated

== Tours ==
Headlining

- Break It All Apart Tour (2018)
- Sound Safari Tour (2023)
