= Osborne Macharia =

Kenyan commercial photographer and digital artist

- Born: April 11, 1986 (age 40); Nairobi, Kenya
- Known for: Afro-Futuristic Digital Art and Photography
- Notable work: Kipipri 4
- Style: Afrofuturism
- Website: k63.studio

Osborne Macharia (born 11 April 1986 in Nairobi) is a self-taught Kenyan commercial photographer and digital artist whose work focuses on themes of Afrofuturism in culture, identity, and fictional narratives. Macharia defines Afrofuturism as “an artistic repurposing of the post-colonial African narratives by integrating historical elements, present realities, and future aspirations of people of color, through narrative fantasy and fiction, to reimagine a new Africa.” He has been called "a master at creating alternate black universes."

== Career ==
Macharia did not initially pursue a commercial career in photography.

His path to photography began through a failure. In 2010 he was still studying for his bachelor's degree in Architecture.Then he failed his last unit in his fourth year of studying to gain a degree in architecture. In his year long gap, he found the work of New York-based photographer Joey L.

Macharia is completely self-taught, relying heavily on online tutorials and research to build his skills in photography. Macharia primarily works with an 80mm lens with the Medium Format camera system and Phocus Software and Lightroom. He also relies heavily on Photoshop.

His artwork has been featured by many brands, including Vogue, Marie Claire, Coke, Afro Punk, and BBC. He was commissioned to create original artwork for the film Black Panther and the US television drama Queen Sugar.

In 2017, he spoke at the Design Indaba Conference.

In 2018, he was chosen to be on the judging team at the Art Director's Club of New York Awards. Macharia was commissioned to promote the film Black Panther by designing and creating a collection of Afrofuturistic inspired photographs This project was titled "Ilgelunot", which means the "Chosen Ones" in Maasai. Macharia was selected as one of "Five Creative Revolutionaries" of African art by One Source Live. In a creative showcase of their work, each artist selected depicted a different Afrofuturistic alterego. Macharia's was "The Eye" a virtuoso who can record and play back what he sees with a digital eye. This is a metaphor for African people seeing their own culture and heritage as beautiful.

== Artistic process ==
Macharia embraces storytelling as the central part of his artwork. Specifically, he draws “inspiration from African culture, mythology, and futuristic elements” as a way to comment on topics like race and gender identity. He identifies the main principles behind his art as “identity, culture, and fiction.”

The first step in his process is collaboration with his team where he collects visual references and develops the story to get feedback. Macharia’s pre-production consists of finding the models and locations for his photoshoots and designing the costumes. Lastly, in post-production, Macharia digitally edits the photos.

Macharia favors Hasselblad cameras and lenses, and uses Profoto for lighting. For the digital editing, he uses Photoshop and Lightroom.

== Works ==
When describing his Afrofuturistic work, Macharia stated that "it is a post-colonial narrative about the continents, where you embrace history, present culture, and future aspirations of people of color through art... music... fashion – and just tell a different narrative about the continent."

Macharia cites artist Malick Sidibé as one of his African heroes in art.

=== Kipipiri 4 ===
One of Macharia's photographic collections is based on the legend of the Kipipiri Women who lived in the Kipipiri forest. The Kipipiri women were four warriors, wives of the four generals of the Mau Mau, who found innovative ways to incorporate their culture and hairstyles in the efforts to defeat British imperialist rule of Kenya. Every full moon, the women would dress themselves in elaborate hairstyles that would be useful in their revolutionary efforts.

Their leader, Bobo, had hair twisted in elaborate knots and curls that mirrored the map the women would use to navigate the caves in which their husbands would hide at night to plan. The second in command, Chep, was skilled in weaponry and combat and had the extraordinary ability to see in the dark. Her hair was woven into large curls so that she could hide knives and other weapons in it. The third warrior, Achi, was the most skilled chef in the village. Her job was to prepare and carry large amounts of food to and from the village in her basket-weaved hair. She is depicted as having a strong neck, so as to always keep her head level and the food stored in her hair upright. The last warrior, Mwende, was the entertainer of the village. She never ventured into the forest but instead prepared the women at home to welcome the men back from war when they returned. Her hair resembled large sound amplifiers, and she wore a mouth-piece connected to pipes that allowed her vocals to travel to the amplifiers in her head.

=== Kenya's League of Extravagant Grannies ===
This photographic collection depicts three older women, retired from their jobs as government ministers and business women. Macharia states, “They now live the retired high life travelling to exotic and remote areas of Africa to explore, party and enjoy in exclusivity.”

=== Capture Kenya I and II ===
This photographic collection was commissioned by Safaricom, Kenya's telecommunications company on the theme of "This Is My Kenya." He traveled in coastal Kenya for 10 days taking photographs. Macharia said the aim was to change negative stereotypes of Kenya.

=== Ilgelunot ===
Macharia was commissioned by Marvel to create this piece in 2018 for Black Panther which was also shown in the exhibition Marvel Studios: Ten Years of Heroes. It translates to "The Chosen Ones," and depicts the Black Panther's advisors in Wakanda named Kokan, Koinet, and the leader Saiton. Described as "blind Maasai elders," they are said to have been "rescued by King T’chaka during World War 2 after wandering the vast plains of North Africa for months in search of refuge."

The leader of the Ilgelunot, Saiton, is dressed in a hybrid of modern and Traditional African garments. Her 'tutu' dress is a reference to the gay community and cross-dressing, "which was brought by the ‘mzungu’ and completely unheard-of (and even despised) in African traditional culture."

=== Other works ===
- "Shallowgo on Lake Turkana"
- "Black Sudan"
- "No Touch Am"
- "Remember the Rude Boy II- Ghana Edition"
- "Macicio"
- "Moon Watching"
- "Melanin Zero"
- "The Eye"

== Awards ==
- Kenya Cannes Lion Award (2015)
- One Show Finalist (2016)
- Featured in Lurzers Archive 200 Best Digital Artists Worldwide (2016 and 2018)
- Hasselbald Masters Finalist (2016)

== Exhibitions ==
- Marvel Studios: Ten Years of Heroes in Singapore, 2018
- Exhibition Afrofuturism in Amsterdam, Netherlands, 2018
- N’Gola Festival in São Tomé and Príncipe, Central Africa, 2019
- Still Here Tomorrow in Cape Town, South Africa, 2019

== See also ==
- Christophe Madihano
- Chakaia Booker
- Afrofuturism
