= Ohangla =

Ohangla is a traditional dance among the Luo community. It was used to celebrate weddings and also in funeral ceremonies as part of Tero Buru. Ohangla consists of more than eight drums played with sticks and a cylindrical, shoulder- slung drum, usually accompaniedby a flute, Nyatiti or kinanda. Tony Nyadundo, Prince Indah, Emma Jalamo, Otieno Aloka, Freddy Jakadongo, Osogo Winyo and Onyi Papa Jey are among the best-known Ohangla musicians. The original Ohangla featured a very fast tempo and often conveyed vulgar messages in its lyrics. Local elders would ban Ohangla music in the early 1980s because it was considered suitable for only adults. "The songs can only be interpreted by very intelligent or mature people, but not children or teenagers," noted Juma Oketch, an Ohangla band vocalist based in Nairobi.

Ohangla is mainly associated with vigorous hip gyrations, suggestive dances, obscene lyrics, and liberal changaa (illicit brew) drinking among fans and players. Indeed, in the early 1980s, the then chief of West Alego in Alego/Usonga constituency, Siaya District (Currently Siaya County), Peter Osowo, banned the performance of Ohangla within the location after one of his wives eloped with a physically challenged Ohangla player. "Ere kaka puth nyalo maya dhako?" (How can a crippled man take away my wife?), protested a fuming Osowo at a local chief's baraza (gathering).

An old Dholuo adage goes "Ohangla ok budhgo miaha," which means Ohangla is never to be used to entertain a woman or a bride for that matter. But the Luo sages who coined this saying must now be turning in their graves. For today, Ohangla is used for common entertainment, including at wedding parties, burial ceremonies and campaign rallies. In the olden days, Ohangla was mainly played at funerals, beer parties and during Yawo rut (a celebration to mark the birth of twins). No Luo worth his salt would attend an in-law's funeral minus Ohangla.

Ohangla, a traditional musical style originally associated with the Luo, community of western Kenya, has been reborn and now cuts across age groups and tribal lines. Modern Ohangla, infused with contemporary instruments while retaining original beats and vocal harmonies, is now used for general entertainment, including at wedding parties and campaign rallies. Unlike in the past when Ohangla was primarily played at funerals, beer parties and other cultural celebrations. Gone are the days when Ohangla music was mainly associated with energetic twist of the hips, provocative dances, obscene lyrics and liberal changaa (illicit brew) drinking among fans and players.

But Ohangla has now been revitalized unlike in the past when the music was mainly enjoyed by middle-aged and old men and women from the Luo community. Both the young and the old, Luos and non-Luos have embraced Ohangla, with passion. It is not surprising to hear a person from the Kikuyu tribe, humming the lyrics of Ohangla, which never misses from the entertainment menu at any major event in Kenya today. Even foreign tourists are not an exception, especially those from Europe who attend frequent Ohangla night spots in Nairobi city and can be seen dancing wildly to the beats.Veteran Ohangla players like "Dr" Oduor Odhialo and Jack Nyadundo have kept the Ohangla flame alive; a number of upcoming artistes are giving them a run for their money.

The Luo traditional instrument Ohangla has revolutionised music scene and trends have moved in the last couple of years.With wonderment, fans gyrate their hips like possessed villagers.Indeed, Ohangla has transcended tribal borders and is largely accepted even by people who hardly understand the messages in the music.
