= Cyrus Kabiru =

Kenyan visual artist (born 1984)

- Born: 1984 (age 41–42); Nairobi, Kenya
- Occupation: Visual artist
- Known for: Sculptural eyewear and other wearables made of found objects
- Movement: Afrofuturism

Cyrus Kabiru (born 1984) is a Kenyan visual artist, who is self taught. He is known for his sculptural eyewear made of found objects, and is part of the Afrofuturism cultural movement.

== Biography ==
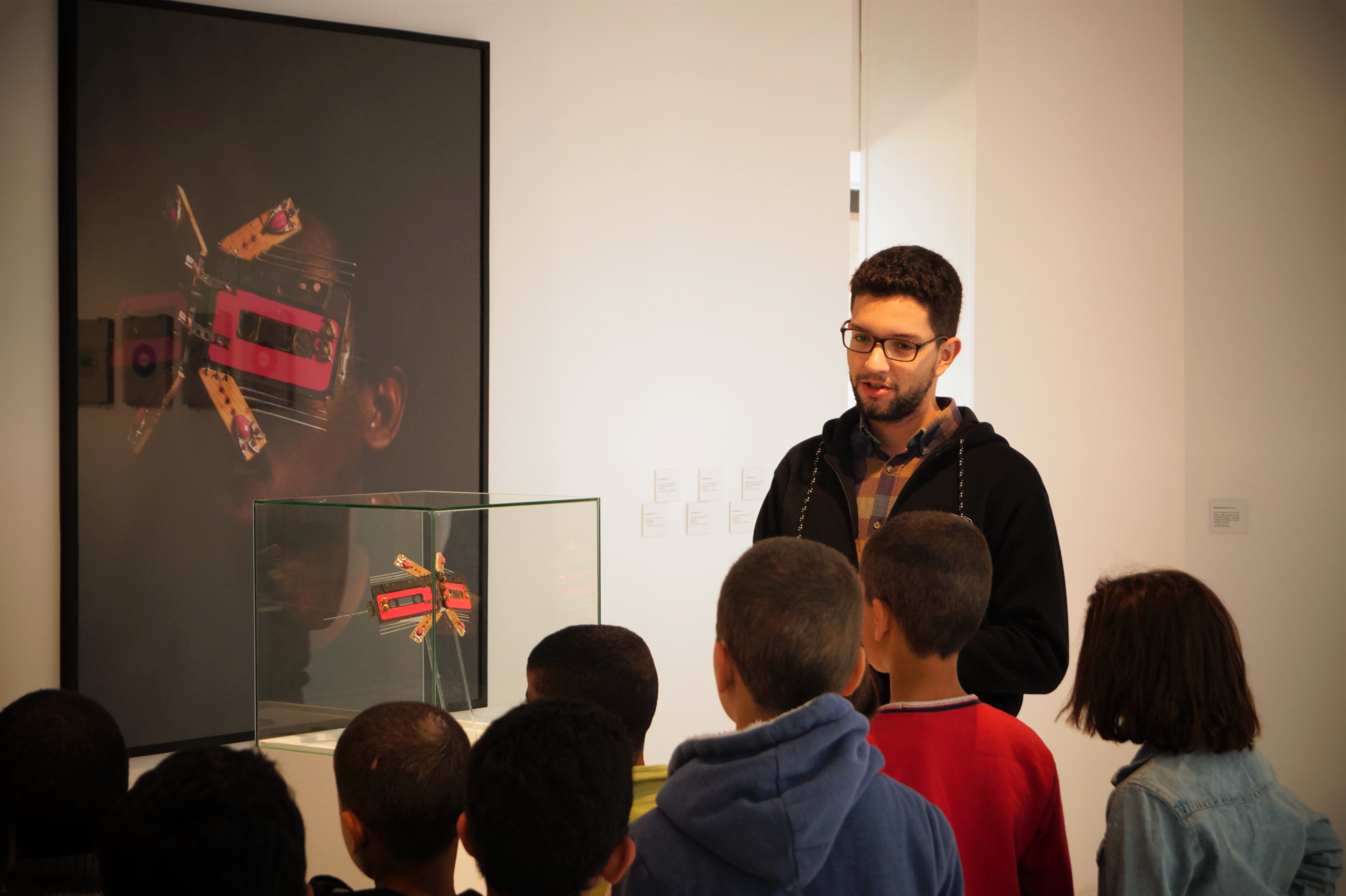
Kids from Casablanca, Morocco, visiting the art show "Material Insanity" (2019) at Marrakech's Museum of African Contemporary Art Al Maaden (MACAAL). Work by Cyrus Kabiru.

Cyrus Kabiru was born in 1984 in Nairobi, Kenya; one of six children who lived in a small home opposite a garbage dump. Inspired by a story about his father repairing glasses with discarded materials, he became interested in creating objects by upcycling found objects and trash. Kabiru's self-taught exposure to artistic thinking began at an early age, despite his father's wishes to pursue a separate career in electronic engineering. Kabiru attributes much of his incentive for his ongoing works to his father and their shared experiences.

Kabiru is known for his signature style, usually constructing his sculptural works with found objects. By using found objects, Kabiru gives a new life to the old materials, and the work deals with topics such as transformation and imagination of the future. After creating his sculptures, he often photographs them as self-portraits. Kabiru's art practice intersects sculpture, craftsmanship, photography, design and fashion. Though much of his experience with art is self-taught, his career officially began in 2007 when he first exhibited in the Kuona Trust Visual Arts Centre in Nairobi, Kenya.

Besides his production of serial artworks, Kabiru has attended various exhibitions and workshops. Notable solo exhibitions by Kabiru include Upcoming (2010) Kuona Trust, Nairobi, Kenya; Cyrus Kabiru (2011) Kunstpodium T Gallery, Tilburg, Netherlands; and C-Stunners & Black Mamba (2015) SMAC Gallery, Cape Town, South Africa. His works are featured in museum collections, including Studio Museum Harlem and the Metropolitan Museum of Art.

=== Afrofuturism ===
Kabiru's particular usage of discarded materials—often electronic parts, junk or other debris—is meant to evoke a sense of cyberpunk futurism with some visual similarities to African jewelry and mythology. Identifying as an Afrofuturist, he aims to construct his works in a way that combines science-fiction and traditional aesthetics, maintaining a consistent personal style. His work is praised for its capacity to change viewers' perspectives, advancing discourse amidst discussions of African intellectual fields, and exploring the relationship between the past and future. Kabiru's work has been featured in several Afrofuturist publications, including the Metropolitan Museum of Art's Before Yesterday We Could Fly: An Afrofuturist Period Room.

== Notable artwork ==
=== C-Stunners series ===
The C-Stunners series—which is among his most well-known sets—is an ongoing collection of irregular, futuristic eyeglass sculptures with various designs. Kabiru began official production of this series in 2011, but has been making similar sculptures of this manner since his childhood. Similarly to a considerable portion of his physical artwork, his C-Stunners are constructed with recycled materials, such as discarded electrical parts and other refuse. According to Kabiru, the name 'C-Stunners' is meant to signify the artist's name (Cyrus) followed by a statement of how it affects the audience; a "stunned" reaction. The C-Stunners series has received appraisal for inviting new perspectives from viewers upon how they perceive African culture.

Self-portrait photography of Kabiru wearing these pieces are often displayed as their own works, such as the Macho Nne collection.

=== Black Mamba series ===
The Black Mamba series is an assortment of assembled sculptures made to resemble the Indian-based bicycle brand of the same name. Kabiru created this series as an homage to the brand, which saw considerable usage as a method of transport in Kenya, though these bikes have gradually seen less activity due to urbanization in African neighborhoods. Kabiru also maintains a personal connection with the bicycles, having ridden one himself as a child. This series of artworks has seen considerable public exposure, being linked to the inception of The End of Black Mamba, a documentary series also produced by Kabiru.

=== Miyale Ya Blue, 2020 ===
Miyale Ya Blue (2020) is a 60 x 65 x 15cm. assembled sculpture made with electronic waste and junk-like materials, decorated with vibrant coloration and noticeable adornments, and is one of a series of sculptures that resemble custom-fashioned radios. Kabiru drew inspiration for this series from his own personal experiences with transistor radios; this specific piece gets its name from the Swahili word 'miyale' (meaning 'rays') to invoke the rays of the sun. Miyale Ya Blue is on display at the Metropolitan Museum of Art in New York City and is featured amongst a collection of Afrofuturist artworks.

== Exhibitions ==
=== Solo exhibitions ===
- (2015) C-Stunners & Black Mamba, SMAC Gallery, Cape Town, South Africa.
- (2011) Cyrus Kabiru, Kuntspodium T Gallery, Tilburg, Netherlands.
- (2010) Constructions (Upcoming), Kuona Trust, Nairobi, Kenya.

=== Group exhibitions ===
- (2021) Before Yesterday We Could Fly: An Afrofuturist Period Room, The Metropolitan Museum of Art, New York City.
- (2014) Lagos Photo Festival, Lagos, Nigeria.
- (2013) Afrofuture: Adventure with Makers, Thinkers, and Dreamers, Milan Design Week, Italy.
- (2013) The Shadows Took Shape, Studio Museum in Harlem, New York City, US.

== Collections ==
- Zeitz Museum of Contemporary Art Africa (MOCAA), Cape Town, South Africa.
- Studio Museum in Harlem, New York City.
- Lemaitre Collection, Paris.
- Hans Nefkens H+F Collection, Rotterdam, Netherlands.
- Helena Fernandino & Emilio Pi Collection, Madrid, Spain.
- Kuona Trust, Nairobi, Kenya.
- Scheryn Collection, Cape Town, South Africa.
- Saatchi & Abel Collection, Cape Town, South Africa.

== Publications ==
- (2015) The End of Black Mamba, Han Nefkens H+F Collection.

== Honors and awards ==
- (2016) Quartz's Africa Innovators Award, Nairobi, Kenya.
- (2013) TED Fellowship @ The Young, The Gifted, The Undiscovered, US.

== See also ==
- List of Kenyan artists
