= Earthdance =

Music festival

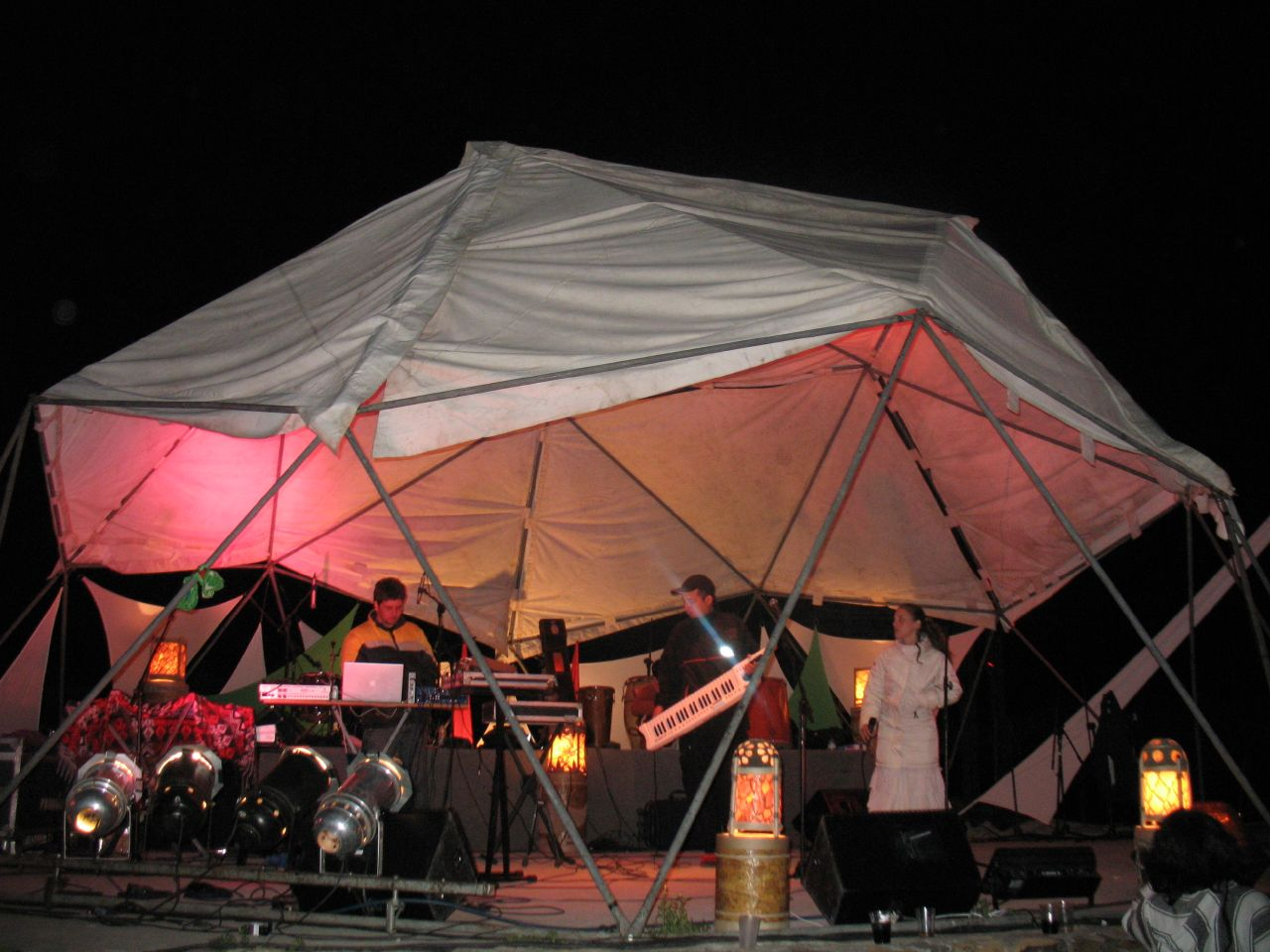
- stage in 2006
- Genre: Electronic music, etc.
- Location: Around the World
- Years active: 1997-present
- Website: Earthdance.org

The Earthdance Global Peace Party is the world's largest underground music and dance event for peace. Held annually since 1997, the event features hundreds of music artists, DJs, dancers, and speakers at local Earthdance events around the world, on the same weekend each year. The Earthdance event is aligned with the annual international Peace Day on September 21 and includes a global synchronized affirmation for peace. Earthdance is produced by Earthdance Global, and supports the Earthdance International non-profit organization.

== History ==
Earthdance was founded in 1997, by event producer and music artist Chris Deckker (Medicine Drum, Return To The Source), and Joseph Oliver. Deckker produced the global event until 2009. Deckker also produced the Earthdance Northern California Festival from 1999 until 2011.

In 2001, Deckker joined Reavis Daniel Moore (Medicine Drum's manager at the time of Earthdance's founding), and music entrepreneur Matthew Marshall (founder of Higher Octave Music) in co-founding the Earthdance International 501(c)(3) non-profit organization. Together they also co-founded the Earthdance Global, LLC in 2003, the partnership that holds the rights to the Earthdance trademark and produces the global event. Moore and Marshall have served as executive producers of the Earthdance global event since 2009.

Since the first Earthdance in 1997, with 22 cities in 18 countries, more than 700 events have been held in over 50 countries. Earthdance was born out of the psychedelic trance electronic dance music scene, but has grown to include multiple musical genres, with most events still featuring "psytrance" music.

== Mission ==
Earthdance's mission is to celebrate and serve through its music and dance events, and to promote peace, sustainability and social justice via its international community, and its network of event producer partners.

== Social responsibility ==
Earthdance events around the world support and promote a range of non-profit organizations working in the areas of peace, sustainability and social justice, with each event donating 50% or more of its profits to its non-profit partners, and featuring the organizations at their events.

Since 1997, Earthdance events have supported hundreds of charitable organizations, including: Sea Shepherd Conservation Society, Sierra Club, Salvation Army, Orphanage in Kijaszkowo, Natural Resources Defense Council, Amnesty International, Aboriginal Health Center, Aqua for All, Circle of Life, Citizens for Peace, Friends of the Mississippi River, Jerusalem Peace Makers, and the Oshkosh Rhythm Institute.

== Performers and presenters ==
Earthdance events have featured performances by Mickey Hart, Ozomatli, Michael Franti & Spearhead, DJ Fita, Blackalicious, Steve Kimock, Particle, Zap Mama, Sound Tribe Sector Nine, Digable Planets, Anthony B, Bassnectar, and Ani DiFranco.

Earthdance events have also featured many notable speakers including: Rick Doblin, Wavy Gravy, Oren Lyons, Daniel Solnit, John Perry Barlow, and Sean Siple.

== See also ==
- List of electronic music festivals
