= Global Online Academy =

Nonprofit education organization

- Abbreviation: GOA
- Formation: 2011; 15 years ago
- Founder: Albuquerque Academy, Catlin Gabel School, Cranbrook Schools, Dalton School, Germantown Friends School, Head-Royce School, King's Academy, Lakeside School, Punahou School
- Type: Nonprofit organization
- Purpose: Online education
- Members: 117 schools (2021)
- Affiliations: New England Association of Schools and Colleges, National Association of Independent Schools, Mastery Transcript Consortium
- Website: globalonlineacademy.org

Global Online Academy (GOA) is a nonprofit organization which provides online classes, workshops, and other educational resources for students and teachers. Accredited courses for middle and high school students are offered through GOA by a consortium of about 120 member schools, all independent.

== Structure ==
GOA courses are taught online by teachers at Academy member schools. These teachers create the coursework and schedule for each course, but the student experience is largely asynchronous. Each course is 15 weeks long, with students spending (on average) 5-7 hours per week on work related to the course.

Students at member schools have access to any course in the GOA catalog.

== Activity ==
In 2020, GOA partnered with Western Governors University to offer public schools an online "Next Generation Teaching Series" focused on helping teachers effectively teach online during the COVID-19 pandemic.

During the 2020-2021 school year, GOA enrollment rose 40 percent, and students from 26 countries were taking GOA courses.
