= Madi TV =

Congolese Swahili-language TV channel

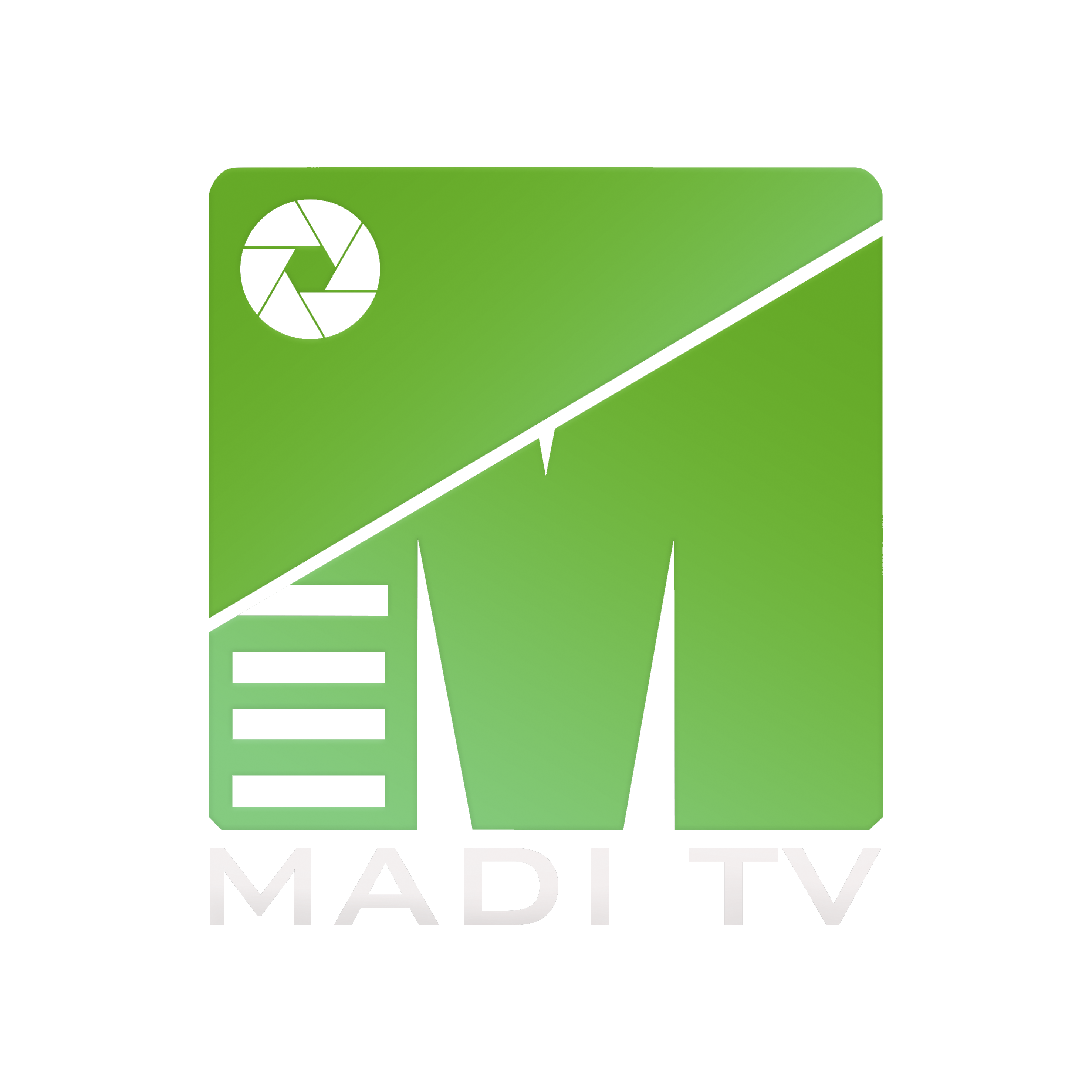
- "Burudani Milele !"
- Type: Free-to-air TV channel
- Country: Democratic Republic of the Congo
- Broadcast area: Africa, Europa, America
- Network: Canal+ Afrique
- Headquarters: Goma, North Kivu

Programming
- Language(s): Swahili language
- Picture format: 1080i HDTV

Ownership
- Owner: Madi Pictures
- Key people: Christophe Madihano

History
- Founded: 2020
- Launched: 30 September 2021; 3 years ago
- Founder: Christophe Madihano; Christian Madihano

Links
- Website: maditvafrica.com

Madi TV, sometimes called Madi TV Africa, is a Congolese Swahili-language pay television owned and operated by Madi Pictures, a digital entertainment company based in Democratic Republic of the Congo. The channel, launched in 2020 and headquartered in Goma, broadcast in Swahili language a mix of entertainment programs and purchased movies and TV shows.

== Background ==
=== History ===
Madi TV was co-created by Christophe Madihano and his twin brother Christian Madihano in 2020. On 30 September 2021 Canal+ in the Democratic Republic of the Congo launched a new service plan, which added the Madi TV and Maboke TV channels to its ACCESS format, Digital terrestrial television, EasyTV.

Madi TV broadcasts from its headquarters in Goma, a city located in the eastern Democratic Republic of Congo's province North Kivu, to 38 African countries via Canal+ Afrique and to the whole world via Canal+ Overseas.

=== Branding ===
The logo shows traditional art handicraft and the large mammals of the African Great Lakes region, surrounded by the letter "M" (initial of the name of the channel and its parent company Madi Pictures) in a green background followed, aesthetically at the bottom, the full name of the television channel.

=== Slogan ===
- Since 30 September 2021 : Burudani Milele!.

== Personalities ==
=== Founders ===
- Christophe Madihano
- Christian Madihano
