= Prince Indah =

Kenyan singer and songwriter

- Born: Evance Ochieng Owino; 9 August 1994 (age 32); Siaya District, Kenya
- Occupations: Singer, composer
- Years active: 2012–present
- Label: Ziiki Media

Evance Ochieng Opiyo, professionally known as Prince Indah (born 9 August 1994) is a Kenyan musician and composer specializing in Ohangla and Afro-Rhumba genres. He is recognized for blending traditional Luo rhythms with contemporary sounds. Prince Indah has collaborated with other Kenyan artists, including Bahati and Khaligraph Jones.

== Early life ==
Evance Ochieng Owino was born on 9 August 1994 in Murumba Village in Siaya District. He is the third-born in a family of five children. After the death of his father in 2003, the family moved from Huruma Flats, Nairobi, back to Siaya District. His mother died during his high school years, which forced him to leave school and take on manual labor to support himself.

== Music career ==
Due to financial constraints he dropped out of school and joined the Ramogi Ohangla Rhumba Band, led by his uncle Emma Jalamo. He started as a drummer and percussionist in the band and gradually became a backup singer and curtain raiser.

In 2014, Prince Indah released his debut album, featuring tracks like Cinderella and Nyakisumu Pt 1. He later established his own group, the Malaika Ohangla Rhumba Band, and released albums such as Tenda Wema and Weche Hera. His music blends traditional Ohangla rhythms with modern Afro-Rhumba influences.

Collaborations with artists like Bahati and Khaligraph Jones have further elevated his profile. His hit song Adhiambo, featuring Bahati, showcases his ability to merge genres and reach diverse audiences.

== Personal life ==
Prince Indah, born Evance Ochieng Opiyo, is married to Winnie Nyamigori, with whom he shares a daughter named Kamara. His traditional wedding, held in Migori County, was a grand affair. Prince Indah remains deeply connected to his Luo heritage, often reflecting his cultural values in his music and personal life.

== Discography ==
Albums

- Puonj Mag Dak (Formula 5) (2023)
- Kitabu Mar Hera (2021)
- Cinderella (Debut Album)

=== Singles ===
Title	Year of release
Mama Watoto	2020
Adhiambo(feat Bahati)	2021
My Abebo(feat Bahati)	2022
Nyar Migori	2023
Kogik Otieno	2023
Duk Jawiro	2023
Osiepe	2023
Twanga Pepeta(featuring Phina & Cedo)	2023
Ogada Memba	2023
Nyar Jaduong	2024
Mummy Chulo	2024
Rembo	2025
Simu Ya Nini	2025
Nyar Msee (featuring Tony Ndiema, Musa Jakadala, Augusto Papa Yo, and Wuod Fibi)	2025
Ka Manene	2025

== Awards ==
- Order of Grand Warrior (OGW) (2024)
- Male Video of the Year Award (2024)
