= G30 Schools =

Association of elite secondary schools

G30 Schools, formerly G20 Schools, is an association of secondary schools founded by David Wylde of St. Andrew's College, Grahamstown, South Africa, and Anthony Seldon of Wellington College, Berkshire, United Kingdom, in 2006.

The G30 Schools have an annual conference which aims to bring together a group of school heads who want to look beyond the parochial issues of their own schools and national associations and to discuss key issues facing education and their roles as "educational leaders".

The association includes about 30 schools from about 15 countries, with membership by invitation and a vote of existing members. G30 schools are chosen on two criteria: the reputation of the school and the reputation of the school's leader.

== History ==
=== Founding members ===
The 20 founding schools originated from South Africa, Australia, Britain, Europe, Hong Kong, Jordan, Turkey, and the United States (not to be confused with the G20 Summit).

- South Africa: St Andrews, Bishops, St John's College St. Cyprian's School, Cape Town, Tiger Kluff, and St Stithians College
- Australia: The King's School (Sydney), Melbourne Grammar School, St Peter's College (Adelaide) and Scotch College (Melbourne)
- Canada: Appleby College (Oakville)
- India: The Doon School, Dehra Dun
- Jordan: King's Academy
- Switzerland: International School of Geneva
- United Kingdom: Eton College, Marlborough College, Millfield School, Sevenoaks School and Wellington College, Berkshire
- United States: Buckingham Browne & Nichols (MA), Deerfield Academy (MA), Phillips Academy Andover (MA), Phillips Exeter Academy (NH), Hotchkiss School (CT), Lawrenceville School (NJ)

=== Current members ===
- Australia
  - MLC, Sydney
- Canada
  - Appleby College
  - Branksome Hall
  - Upper Canada College
- China
  - High School Affiliated to Renmin University of China
  - Hangzhou Foreign Languages School
- Hong Kong
  - Chinese International School
- India
  - Emerald Heights School
  - Daly College
- Kenya
  - Brookhouse School
- New Zealand
  - King's College
- Romania
  - Transylvania College
- United Kingdom
  - Stowe School
  - Wellington College
  - Shrewsbury School
  - Winchester College
- United States
  - Deerfield Academy
  - Choate Rosemary Hall
  - Northfield Mount Hermon School

== Conferences ==
The G30 Schools conferences have been held in:

Date	School	School country
2006	Wellington College, Berkshire	United Kingdom
2007	Bishops Diocesan College and St. Andrew's College	South Africa
2008	King's Academy	Jordan
2009	Harvard Westlake School	United States
2010	The King's School, Parramatta	Australia
2011	International School of Geneva	Switzerland
2012	Phillips Exeter Academy and Buckingham Browne and Nichols	United States
2013	Daly College	India
2013	Assistant Heads Conference hosted by Wellington College	United Kingdom
2014	Markham College	Peru
2015	Wellington College, Marlborough College, and Stowe	United Kingdom
2016	High School Affiliated to Renmin University of China (RDFZ), Beijing and Chinese International School, Hong Kong	China
2016	Assistant Heads Conference hosted by Appleby College & Buckingham Browne and Nichols	Canada, United States
2017	Brookhouse School	Kenya
2018	Carey Baptist Grammar School	Australia
2019	Appleby College and Upper Canada College	Canada
2023	Sigtunaskolan Humanistiska Läroverket	Sweden
2024	Shrewsbury School, Stowe School, Wellington College, Winchester College	United Kingdom
2025	Geelong Grammar School, King's College London	Australia, United Kingdom
2026	Choate Rosemary Hall	United States
