= Achieng Abura =

Kenyan musician

Lydia Achieng Abura (died 20 October 2016) was a Kenyan singer who performed Afro-jazz, Afro-fusion, and gospel music.

== Life ==
Achieng Abura was born in Eldoret and held an MSc. degree in Philosophy and Environmental Studies. She had one child, a son named Prince.

She had a love for music, was a great orator, and took music professionally, debuting with a gospel album called I Believe around 1990. Other albums that followed were, Way Over Yonder and Sulwe. In 2002, when she had shifted to Afro-jazz, she released the album Maisha. Kenyan musician Abbi was formerly Abura's backing vocalist before he became a prominent solo artist. Later Abura released the album Spirit Of a Warrior. In 2007, she released her last album titled Dhahabu Yangu by the Blu Zebra label, owned by Tedd Josiah.

== Career ==
She was the voice of Crow in Tinga Tinga Tales. She was a UNDP Goodwill Ambassador, and toured abroad, for example in Spain. She was a member of the Divas of The Nile supergroup that featured four Kenyan female musicians Suzzana Owiyo, Mercy Myra, and Princess Jully, and performed at the Festival Mundial in Tilburg, Netherlands in 2007.

In 2008, she acted as a principal judge of the East African Project Fame (TPF) and also campaigned for the Global Call to Action Against Poverty.

Abura died on 20 October 2016 after a short illness at Kenyatta National Hospital.

== Awards ==
Abura won the Kora Award in 2004 for Best East African Female; the award was shared with Tsedenia Gebremarkos of Ethiopia. She was nominated for the social responsibility category at the 2008 Kisima Music Awards. She was among the Kenyan artistes sponsored by the Alliance Française in Nairobi.

== Legacy ==
Before she died, Abura had set up an online fund for her son, Prince, who had a heart condition and sickle-cell anaemia. In the week following her death, the fund grew considerably and Prince was offered an educational scholarship. Prince Abura later died on 10 May 2021 while he was a student at Riara University and was set to have graduated in September of the same year.
