= King's Academy =

Coordinates: 31.75325°N 35.848142°E

- Madaba; Jordan

Information
- Type: Private, boarding International school
- Motto: Floreat Scientia
- Established: 2007
- Head of School: Penny Townsend
- Grades: 7–12
- Gender: Co-educational
- Colors: Red, blue, and gold
- Athletics: Co-educational curricular activities
- Mascot: Lion
- Website: kingsacademy.edu.jo

King's Academy (Arabic transliteration: "كينغز أكاديمي") is an independent, co-educational boarding and day school for students in grades 7 to 12 in Madaba-Manja, Jordan. It is named in honor of King Abdullah II of Jordan and seeks to fulfill His Majesty's vision of producing "a new generation of enlightened and creative minds."

King Abdullah attended high school at Deerfield Academy in the United States as there was no school of comparable standing in Jordan when he was a boy, but his son Crown Prince Hussein enrolled in the new school's second incoming class (2008). The school's first headmaster, Dr. Eric Widmer, was a past headmaster of Deerfield.

The primary language of instruction at King's Academy is English. Both Arabic-speaking and non-Arabic-speaking students are required to study Arabic. The academy is a member of the G30 Schools group.

The school is included in The Schools Index as one of the 150 best private schools in the world and among top 15 schools in the Middle East.

== Location and campus ==
The campus and buildings are constructed on a 575-dunum (144-acre) site and comprise some 35 major buildings.

=== Athletic facilities ===
The athletic facilities include a semi-Olympic swimming pool, tennis court, squash court, handball, and basketball courts, and cardio and weight training facilities. There is also an outdoor sports stadium that includes a full-size football field, two additional football fields, and a track.

=== King Abdullah II Spiritual Center ===
The King Abdullah II Spiritual Center is a multi-faith spiritual center that is available for use to all members of the school community, regardless of their faith. Both the indoor prayer room and the open-air courtyard are available for use at all times by students, faculty, staff, and campus visitors.

=== The Abdul Majeed Shoman Auditorium ===
The Abdul Majeed Shoman Auditorium holds around 200 people and is the location of both school and community events including concerts, student recitals, plays, and dance performances. Students and faculty members gather here for weekly school meetings.

=== The Sheikh Jabir Al-Ahmad Al-Sabah Building ===
The building has a total area of 2,200 square meters and houses the Middle School, the Office of the Headmaster, and the Office of Admissions.

=== The HRH Sheikh Mohammed Bin Rashid Al Maktoum Library ===
For use by students, faculty, staff and guests of King's Academy, the HRH Sheikh Mohammed Bin Rashid Al Maktoum Library holds 50,000 volumes.

== Student body ==
The King's Academy campus was built to accommodate both day and boarding students, the latter comprising about 60 percent of the student body.

For the 2025–2026 academic year, 484 students were enrolled at the school, representing some 40 countries in the Middle East and around the world. Of these students, 45 percent are female, and 55 percent are male.

Approximately 40% of students receive financial aid.

== Academics ==
The school's curriculum is based on the American Advanced Placement (AP) program, and the Middle School curriculum is based on the College Board’s QUEST framework for teaching and learning. Students intending to attend a Jordanian university or gain certain professional licenses in Jordan can obtain a certificate of Tawjihi equivalency in lieu of taking the national Tawjihi examination. The primary language of instruction at King's Academy is English, but the study of Arabic is required of all students.

King's Academy is accredited by the New England Association of Schools and Colleges. It is a founding member of Global Online Academy, a member of G30 Schools, and a Round Square school.
