= South C =

Residential estate in Nairobi, Kenya

Coordinates: 1°19′01″S 36°49′30″E

South C or South Compton (during colonial times) is an upper-class residential estate located in the southland area of Nairobi.

South C lies next to Wilson Airport. It is bordered by South B to the north-east, Langata Estate to the west and the Nairobi National Park to the south.

The headquarters of the Kenya Red Cross Society is located in South C as is the Criminal Investigation Department (C.I.D) Training School of the Kenya Police, National Environmental Management Authority Headquarters (NEMA), Kenya National Bureau of Standards Head office (KEBS) and the expansive Toyota Training Academy.

Major colleges like the College of Insurance and Management University of Africa are also based in South C.

South C is home to several sports clubs and hotels. The clubs include The South C Sports Club, Ministry of Works (MOW) Sports Club, Kenya Motor Sports Club, and the Ngara Sports Club. The Ngara Sport Club cricket ground is located in South C. Some of the hotels in South C are The Boma, The Red Court Hotel, Ole Sereni and Eka Hotel

A drive-in outdoor cinema, one among few in Kenya, is located at Nairobi's South C along Mombasa Road at Bellevue.

A number of musicians, comedians and DJs in Kenya's music industry come from the South C. Nameless, E-Sir, Longombas and K-rupt live there.
