= Bamboo (rapper) =

Kenayan musicians

Simon Kimani, more popularly known as Bamboo, is an MC who represents Kenya and lives in New York City.

== Biography ==
He was raised in Inglewood, California by parents of East African descent, and at the age of 17, his parents sent him to Nairobi, Kenya to eschew the potentially dangerous life they feared he might have if he stayed in Inglewood. Bamboo transferred the success he was beginning to have in California to Nairobi, acquiring a record deal and producing his first album, Nairoberry, with his group K-South in 2001. He formed the record label Project 254 in Nairobi with Kenyan emcees Tim Waindi and Attitude. Bamboo is also a member of the record label The Grass Company, and he states that he intends to re-record a previously released album "exactly the way [they] did it in Kenya but now with state-of-the-art equipment" in Atlanta, Georgia.

Bamboo was featured in the film Hip Hop Colony as one of the premiere rappers from Kenya, and in a clip featuring himself and emcees Big Mike and Attitude rapping over live guitar chords. Bamboo's style combines American and Kenyan content while being delivered in a markedly American accent and flow. When asked about the majority of his songs being in English, Bamboo stated, "Rapping in English is the only way to infiltrate the US rap game and get respect because without that respect no one will even bother with you."

Bamboo rededicated his life to Christ in 2016 after a scary dream he had. He has since then maintained his walk of faith, and even became a preacher.
