= K-South =

- Origin: Kariobangi, Nairobi, Kenya
- Years active: 1995–2005
- Labels: Samawati Studios
- Past members: Bamboo; Doobeez

K-South was a Kenyan hip-hop duo made up of "Bamboo" (Tim Kimani) and "Doobeez'" (Jerry Manzekele), now known as "Abbas Kubaff". Founded in 1995, K-South is among the most notable pioneers of the genre in Kenya. The name is an abbreviation of Kariobangi South, the Nairobi neighbourhood where they were based. The group used both English and Swahili raps in their music.

The band's first album, Nairobbery, was released in 2002 by Samawati Studios and contains some of their earliest hits, such as "Tabia Mbaya". Also on the album is "Illektrikk Posse", featuring the Zimbabwean rapper Mizchif and the Ugandan artists Bebe Cool. K-South's second and final album, Nairobizm, was released in 2004. One of its most played tracks was "Kapuka", which coined kapuka as a derogatory term referring to more commercial artists. After the album they left their label Samawati, due to disputes.

K-South was featured on "Sitaki", a popular track by the Kenyan R&B female musician Mercy Myra.

The duo disbanded in 2005, when Bamboo left the group after becoming a devout Christian. He has since concentrated on gospel rap. Earlier, Bamboo released a secular solo track "Compe". Doobiez now performs under the stage name Abbas and released the critically acclaimed album Angabanga in 2006.
