= Tsedenia Gebremarkos =

Ethiopian singer and songwriter (born 1972)

Tsedenia Gebremarkos ፀደንያ ገብረማርቆስ
- Born: 1972 (age 53–54); Addis Ababa, Ethiopian Empire
- Occupations: Singer; songwriter
- Years active: 1997–present
- Children: 2
- Musical career
- Genres: Ethiopian music; pop
- Instrument: Vocals
- Labels: Tibebu Workiye Entertainment; Hop Music Entertainment; Nahom Records
- Website: m.facebook.com/tsedenia.gebremarkos

Tsedenia Gebremarkos (Amharic: ፀደንያ ገብረማርቆስ, born 1972) is an Ethiopian singer and songwriter. She was known for her 2004 album Bisetegn and received Kora Award for the single "Ewedhalehu", which led to her fame. She is known for the pop genre while also performing Ethiopian music and predominantly sings in English and Amharic languages.

She also sang two songs on the album Punt (Made in Ethiopia) by Invisible System released on Harper Diabate Records and produced by Dub Colossus cousin Dan Harper.

Tsedenia also released "Yefikir Girma" in 2015, becoming her most successful hit.

== Life and career ==
Tsedenia Gebremarkos was born in 1972 in Addis Ababa. Tsedenia began her career after releasing her debut album Bisetegn in 2004. The song "Neh Yelijinete" is header of the album, recounts her love story. She shared the Kora Awards under the best East African female artist category in 2004 by her song "Ewedhalehu", with Achien'g Abura (Kenya) for her song "Toto Wangu". Tsedenia has worked with the Ethiopian dub band Dub Colossus. They released an EP, A Town Called Addis in June 2008 through Real World Records and a full length LP album of the same name was released in August 2008 exclusively through the Bowers & Wilkins Music Club.

Tsedenia is influenced by variety musicians, including Phil Collins and The Beatles. She also cited Whitney Houston as an early influence, where she used to sing all her tracks. In 2011, she released a song titled "Hememe".

In 2015, she released "Yefikir Girma", leading to the most successful hit and viewed by users in YouTube. The album of the same name was released in 2016. She was awarded one AFRIMA Award for soundtrack of 2015 film Hareyet, with the song "Yet Biye". Her upcoming album is to be set with writing is belonged to Yilma Gebreab where Getnet Enyew Adibuara and Fasil Kebede credited as assistant songwriters.

== Personal life ==
Tsedenia was born and lives in Addis Ababa. She is the mother of twin children.

== Awards and nominations ==
Year	Award	Category	Result
2004	Kora Award	"Ewedhalehu"	Won
2015	AFRIMA Award	"Yet Beye"	Won

== Discography ==
Studio album

- Bisetegn (2004)
- Yefikir Girma (2016)

EPs

- A Town Called Addis (2008, with Dub Colossus)

== Filmography ==
- Motherland (2010)
