= Orutu =

The orutu is a one-stringed vertical fiddle originated in the pre-colonial societies of Western Kenya, especially amongst the Luo community. In Luhya it's known as ishiriri. The Luo had a strong tradition of stringed instruments and was famous for their skills with harps and lyres. When played with a bow, the orutu creates different notes determined by finger pressure against the central stick.

Although this musical instrument is played a bit like a violin, it has a different, unique sound to it. It is accompanied by drums and singing, but these instruments are not very popular because Kenyan and by extension African traditional music was heavily eroded by the coming of the European missionaries whose advent was followed by European colonialists. The missionaries, with the cooperation of the imperial administration, were probably most directly responsible for the modification, suppression, or even disappearance of many aspects of traditional culture and music in most of the African societies. Everything African or indigenous was purported as bad and contrary to God's will. Many missionaries deemed African culture especially, African music, as a manifestation of heathenism and thus antagonistic to the true faith. The vacuum created by the erosion by the European missionaries and colonialists was filled with Westernization of Africans; thus, when countries like Kenya finally gained independence in 1963, Kenyans started playing pianos, with instruments like the orutu becoming cultural artifacts to be seen and not touched by its own people behind the cold glass of museums all over the world.

The term also refers to a genre of music in Kenya which involves this instrument. The instrument is also a central part of the benga musical genre, with the band Kenge Kenge Orutu System being the most prolific users of the musical instrument.

== Construction ==
The orutu consists of a cylindrical resonator made from a hollowed out piece of wood, which has monitor lizard skin stretched over one side. The string used to be made from sisal fibers, but is now made from repurposed steel bicycle brake cable wire.
