= Mercy Myra =

- Born: Mercy Myra Grundberg
- Genres: R&B, Afro‑fusion
- Occupations: R&B musician, singer, songwriter
- Works: Taba Samu (2001), Nyisri Malong’o (2003), Sitaki
- Years active: 1996–present
- Awards: Kisima Music Awards – R&B Artist of the Year (2003); Kisima Music Awards – Female Artist of the Year (2004); Msanii Awards – Best Female Artist (2009)

Mercy Myra Grundberg, better known as Mercy Myra, is an R&B musician from Kenya.

== Biography ==
In 1996, she joined the Calabash Band but left the following year to join the R&B group Destinee. In 1997, she joined a band called Black Ice. She later went solo and released her first single "Sitaki" (featuring K-South) in the end of 1998, produced by Samawati Studios.

She has performed in various concerts abroad, including the 2004 Zanzibar International Film Festival, and Festival Mundial in Tilburg, the Netherlands in 2002 and 2003.

Mercy Myra was part of the Divas of The Nile supergroup, that featured four Kenyan female musicians. The others were Suzzana Owiyo, Achieng Abura, and Princess Jully. The group performed at the Festival Mundial in 2007.

She moved to the United States in 2005, and subsequently faded from the limelight. However, in 2009, she won the Best Female Artiste category at the Msanii Awards, honouring US-based Kenyan musicians.

She was married to Malimo Chahonyo Andega, an aspiring Kenyan hip hop musician using the stage name Attitude. Their marriage ended in divorce in December 2015.

Mercy Myra returned to the music scene in 2016 after signing a new deal with Atlanta-based label, Nu Royal Records, where she planned to collaborate with Grammy Award winning producer, Herman Little to create a "new" sound.

== Discography ==
Albums:

- TABA SAMU (2001)
- NYISRI MALONG'O (2003)

Singles:

- MALO featuring Khaligraph Jones (2017)
- FEELS LIKE LOVE featuring VicMass Luo Dollar (2017)
- BACK HOME (2014)
- AFRIKAN TANGO (2012)

Featured on:

- Rhythm Jets – VELOCITY (2015)

== Awards ==
- 2003 Kisima Music Awards – R&B Artist of the Year
- 2004 Kisima Music Awards – Female Artist of the Year
- 2009 Msanii Awards – Best Female Artist of the Year

Nominated:

- 2003 Kora Awards – Best East African Artist
