= Dickens Otieno =

Kenyan artist

- Viewers in front of Dickens Otenio work at Africa Basel during Art Basel 2025
- Born: 1979 (age 46–47)
- Education: Technical University of Kenya
- Known for: Visual Art / Textiles / Sculpture

Dickens Otieno is a Kenyan artist who is known for his large-scale woven sculptures using scrap metal. He was featured in the 2022 Kenyan Pavilion of the Venice Biennale.

== Career ==
Otieno studied engineering, but was unable to find work. This left him spending time around the streets of Nairobi where he discovered the work of street artists Otieno Kota and Otieno Gomba.

Otieno then went on to work with the pair from 2003 to 2009 doing street art and painting. He then branched out on his own.

With scarce resources for art materials, Otieno began experimenting with waste materials. He originally started making sculptures with bottle caps, similar to Ghanaian artist El Anatsui, before moving onto his signature style of weaving tin cans into a metal armature. Among Otieno's pieces is a school uniform made with flattened bottle caps.

Otieno's engineering background does play a role in his art, as the wire frames he creates to form the skeletons of his woven designs require a certain amount of internal engineering.

== Personal life ==
Otieno is originally from a village in Migori County, Western Kenya. His mother was a tailor and father was a teacher for deaf children. His father had wanted him to be an engineer, but he ended up being inspired by his mother's work as a seamstress.

== Selected exhibitions ==
- 2022 Venice Biennale, Kenyan Pavilion
- 2021, Mtaani, Steve Turner, Los Angeles (solo)
- 2021, East African Encounters, Cromwell Place, London
- 2020, Mabati Tailor, Circle Art Gallery, Nairobi (solo)
- 2018, See Here, Old Neals Auction House, Nottingham
- 2018, Africa/Africa, Total Arts Courtyard Gallery, Al Quoz, Dubai
- 2017, Young Guns, Circle Art Gallery, Nairobi
- 2016, The Third Dimension, Circle Art Gallery
- 2016, UNI-FORM MULTI-FORM, Roots Contemporary, Nairobi
- 2016, Paint and Metal, National Museum of Nairobi
