= Olivier Bahati =

Burundian footballer

Personal information
- Full name: Olivier Bahati
- Date of birth: 2 September 1985 (age 41)
- Place of birth: Bujumbura, Burundi
- Position: Defender

Team information
- Current team: Mukura Victory Sports
- Number: 4

Senior career*
Years	Team	Apps	(Gls)
2004–	Mukura Victory Sports	70	(24)

International career
2003–	Burundi	2	(0)
- * Club domestic league appearances and goals

Olivier Bahati (born 2 September 1985 in Bujumbura) is a Burundian footballer who plays as a defender for Mukura Victory Sports FC in the Rwandan Premier League.

Bahati started his career with Mukura Victory Sports in 2004.

== International career ==
He has represented his homeland, Burundi, on international levels since 2003.
