= Jimmy Ogonga =

Kenyan artist

- Born: Jimmy; 1977 (age 47–48); Nairobi
- Citizenship: Kenya
- Occupation: sculptor

Jimmy Ogonga is a Kenyan multimedia artist.

== Biography ==
Born in Nairobi, Kenya, Ogonga taught himself fine arts by drawing portraits; these images were often of political figures, the people whose stories and activities he was being exposed to while growing in East Africa. He has exhibited in African and European art galleries. Ogonga started his sculptural works in the 1990s, including curved-wood and welded-metallic images. He lives and works in Nairobi.

He founded the Nairobi Arts Trust in 2001.
