= Princess Jully =

- Also known as: Princess Jully
- Born: Lilian Auma Aoka; Makalda, Nyanza Province, Kenya
- Genres: Luo traditional, Benga
- Occupation: Singer
- Formerly of: Divas of The Nile

Princess Jully (real name Lilian Auma Aoka) was a benga musician from Kenya.

== Early life ==
Lilian Auma Aoka was born in the village of Makalda in South Nyanza, in the southwestern part of Kenya. Her father died when she was one week old, leaving her mother, a small-scale farmer, as the family's provider. Lilian was the youngest of nine children (six survived infancy). Her grandmother, Benta Nyar Kanyamkago Nyagolima, was the first female chief in Nyanza Province and a respected singer and musician. Lilian attended school through Form One, the first year of secondary school in Kenya. On being a female in her village society, Jully has said:

"Then something unfortunate happened my mother could not afford to pay my school fees. To make matters worse, most people within my community had the notion that educating a girl was like watering someone else's field, so boys were given the first priority. I was lucky to go up to Form One at Bikira Girls' High School as many girls in my village did not get the same opportunity, but deep down I remained frustrated."

Lilian became pregnant out of wedlock at a young age and was rejected by the foster father. She soon thereafter met her husband, singer Julius Okumu (stage name Prince Jully), who accepted her pregnancy. After giving birth to her son Felix, she began to accompany Jully's band as a backup singer.

== Career ==
She started as a back-up vocalist for Jolly Boys Band led by her husband Prince Jully (Julius Okumu). She originally used the name "Mbilia Bel" "because I thought my looks were similar to the Zairean singer." Prince Jully died in 1997 and subsequently Princess Jully took over the leadership of the band. Jolly Boys Band was already popular in Kenya when Prince Jully was leading it, but under Princess Jully, the group became even more successful, particularly after the release of the "Dunia Mbaya" hit.

She released new music frequently. Her 19th album "Aneno Lek" was released in March 2007. The album was produced at Ketebul Productions by Tabu Osusa. Her next album Wangni Wabiro was released in August 2007. The title song of the album was dedicated to the Orange Democratic Movement ahead of the 2007 General Election. The album was produced by Tedd Josiah of Blu Zebra Studios. She also set up her own production house, Jully Productions, to promote emerging artists. She toured various countries including Switzerland. In 2010, she released another album Joluo Migingo to Dhi, its title refers to the disputed Migingo Island.

Princess Jully was part of the Divas of The Nile supergroup, that featured four Kenyan female musicians. The others were Suzzana Owiyo, Achieng Abura, and Mercy Myra. The group performed at the Festival Mundial in Tilburg, Netherlands, in 2007. She died on 12 October 2024 at Migori Referrals Hospital after a short illness

== Awards ==
Won:

- 2003 Kisima Music Awards - Benga Artiste of the Year
