= Michael Bundi =

Kenyan reggae artist

Peter Bundi Mutungi (born 15 Feb 1996), commonly known as Michael Bundi, is a Kenyan musician, record producer, and entrepreneur.

He gained recognition shortly after releasing a cover of Inner Circle's “Tenement Yard” with his son Fayez in March 2022. TikTok listed Michael Bundi as one of the biggest breakthrough stars of 2022, and he was also named the Most Viewed Artist on TikTok.

== Early life ==
Bundi was born in Meru, where his father, a music teacher, inspired him to pursue music. He started singing at Cardinal Maurice Otunga Secondary School, Nairobi, and afterward took a music production course. Before gaining recognition, Michael sold music recording equipment, wrote, and produced music.

== Career ==
Bundi's career grew through his TikTok videos. On December 21, 2022, Michael and his son won the Most Influential Young Person of the Year and Music Group of the Year awards at the Xtreem Awards. Being featured on Etana’s Grammy-nominated album Pamoja and meeting Jamaican artist Tarrus Riley contributed to his career development.

== Awards and nominations ==
- Nominated for Best Reggae Album at the 64th Grammy Awards (as a featured artist on Etana's Pamoja)
- Most Influential Young Person of the Year (Xtreem Awards 2022)
- Music Group of the Year (Xtreem Awards 2022)
- Most Viewed Artist on TikTok (2022)
- TikTok Breakthrough Star (2022)

== Personal life ==
Bundi is a father of two and has openly talked about his battle with depression, anxiety, and bullying. He has also expressed that his father was his greatest musical inspiration. Mdundo, a music streaming company, and Pulse Live Kenya named Michael among the top 10 artists who have had a great impact on the Kenyan reggae music industry. Bundi has stated that he aims to inspire others through his music.
