= Tony Nyadundo =

Tony Nyadundo is a musician from Kenya. He performs the Ohangla, a traditional style of music by the Luo community. He is backed by the Ohangla Boys band. He is now branded the "King of Ohangla".

== Early life ==
He was born in Kal in Tanzania. Tony's twin sister died while he was young. His family moved to Nyahera, Kisumu District, Kenya in 1978 and later to Kongoni in Nzoia. He went to Kongoli Primary School and then moved to Bukembe Secondary School in 1985 but dropped out the following year due to lack of school fees. He worked as a tailor until 1992.

== Career ==
He also tried deejaying. His brother Jack Nyadundo formed a group performing Ohangla music, and Tony eventually joined the group after 1996. Later he formed his own group and moved back to Tanzania for a while. In 1998 he moved to Migori District in Kenya and performed for local fishing communities. He also hired Onyi Papa Jey, an orutu player who has also since become a formidable musician. In 1999 he moved to Dandora in Nairobi but did not achieve much success and then moved to Kisumu, where his brother Jack had become a popular musician.

His début album Ayaki was released in 2002. This marked a turning point of his career and he finally started to gain financially from being a musician. His second album was named Kidi Oba e Toke, which translates "stoned on the back". The name derives from a concert when his band was attacked by thugs who hit his drummer on the back. Several other people were injured too.

In 2006 he released album Obama. The name alludes to Barack Obama, the US president whose father is from the ethnic group as Nyadundo.

At the 2007 Kisima Music Awards he won the traditional music category. He was among 100 most influential Kenyans as selected by The Standard newspaper in August 2007.

In October 2009, he released a new album Migingo, named after the disputed Migingo Island.

Tony is recognized for his hits like, dawa ya mapenzi and Obama. He has performed in various countries including Germany and the US.

He was married but divorced in 1994. He has two children from the marriage.

== See also ==
- Luo people of Kenya and Tanzania
