= Wangari Mathenge =

Kenyan visual artist

Wangarì Mathenge
- Born: 1973 (age 52–53); Nairobi, Kenya
- Occupation: Visual artist
- Website: wangarimathenge-studio.com

Wangarì Mathenge (born 1973 in Nairobi, Kenya) is a contemporary visual artist based in Nairobi, Kenya; Buckinghamshire, United Kingdom; and Chicago, Illinois. Her multidisciplinary practice includes painting, drawing, ceramics, sculpture, animation, and installation. Her work explores African identity and culture, focusing on the experiences of Black women and reimagining the domestic sphere as a site of empowerment.

== Education ==
Mathenge earned her MFA in Painting and Drawing from the School of the Art Institute of Chicago in 2021. She previously studied at Howard University and Georgetown University Law Center, where she specialized in International Business and Economic Law.

== Artistic practice ==
Her work incorporates cultural objects to explore gender roles and celebrate Black female identity across the African continent and diaspora.

== Exhibitions ==
=== Solo exhibitions ===
- 2026: Re-membering, Lévy Gorvy Dayan, New York City, NY
- 2024: Bedimmed Boundaries: Between Wakefulness and Sleep, New York City, NY
- 2023: A Day of Rest, Pippy Houldsworth Gallery, London
- 2023: Tidal Wave of Colour, Roberts Projects, Los Angeles
- 2021: You Are Here, Pippy Houldsworth Gallery, London

=== Selected group exhibitions ===
- 2025: The Human Situation: Marcia Marcus, Alice Neel, Sylvia Sleigh, Lévy Gorvy Dayan, New York
- 2025: Through Their Eyes: Selections from the Sandretto Re Rebaudengo Collection, Jan Shrem and Maria Manetti Shrem Museum of Art, University of California, Davis
- 2022: When We See Us: A Century of Black Figuration in Painting, Zeitz Museum of Contemporary Art Africa, Cape Town
- 2021: Black American Portraits, Los Angeles County Museum of Art

== Public collections ==
Mathenge's work is held in several institutional collections, including:

- Hirshhorn Museum and Sculpture Garden, Washington, D.C.
- Crocker Art Museum, Sacramento
- Fondazione Sandretto Re Rebaudengo, Turin
- Rubell Museum, Miami
- Weisman Art Museum, Minneapolis

== Publications and media coverage ==
Mathenge's work has been featured in major art publications and media outlets:

- The New York Times (2025): "100 Years of How Black Painters See Themselves"
- African Art Now (2022) by Osei Bonsu, Octopus Publishing Group
- Great Women Painters (2022), edited by Alison Gingeras, Phaidon Press
- BBC World Service, In the Studio (2024)
- WNYC, All Of It with Alison Stewart (2024)
