= Christophe Madihano =

Congolese photographer

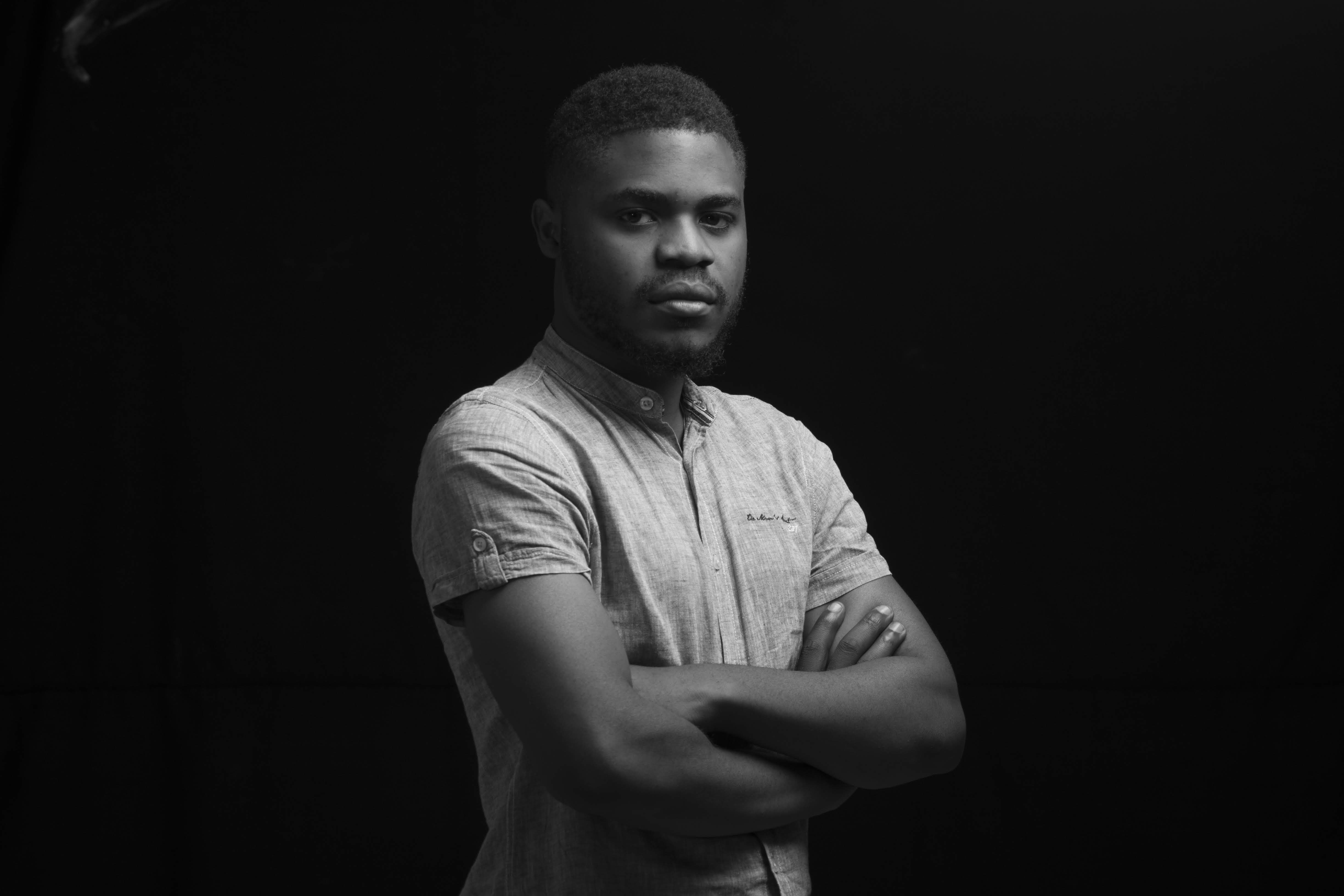
- Christophe Madihano portrait BW
- Born: Christophe Madihano; 10 October 1995 (age 30); Goma, DRCongo
- Known for: Afro-Futuristic Digital Art and Photography
- Notable work: The Kongo Kingdom; Forgotten Heroes
- Style: Afrofuturism
- Website: maditvafrica.com

Christophe Madihano (born 10 October 1995) is a Congolese commercial photographer, author, film producer and illustrator whose work focuses on themes of Afrofuturism in culture, identity, and fictional narratives. He is one of the founders of Madi TV, an international entertainment pay television channel in the Democratic Republic of the Congo.

== Career ==
Christophe Madihano was born on 10 October 1995, in Goma in the Democratic Republic of the Congo. He began his career in 2017 and attracted international attention with his project "The Kongo Kingdom", in which the Swedish-Congolese singer Mohombi appeared as one of the key figures of the Kongo Kingdom.

In 2020, Madihano became widely known through his project "The forgotten heroes". It's a gallery of images showing the Armed Forces of the Democratic Republic of Congo (FARDC) in action in the rain and in a dusty environment, supported by the government of the Democratic Republic of the Congo.

== Works ==
- 2017 : The Kongo Kingdom
- 2019 : The Forgotten Heroes
- 2021 : Havila
