= Christopher Oywecha =

Kenyan expressionist artist

Christopher Oywecha is an abstract expressionist artist whose works portray "his perception of the human condition" as abstract interpretations of daily life. He works mainly in oil and acrylic with vibrant, earthy paintings typical of his style. He portrays peoples' faces and emotions, and the events affecting them and their environment.

Oywecha has produced work for UN-related projects and showcased artwork in various institutions in Kenya.

== Exhibitions ==
- 1993: Nyuzi Za Maisha (Fabric of Life), at National Museum of Kenya
- 1993: Artistic Voices, at French Cultural Centre, Nairobi.
- 1994: Art and Poetry, at French Cultural center, Nairobi
- 1997: East African Art, at National Museum of Kenya.
- 2000: Bomb Terror, at Goethe Institute, Nairobi.
- 2002: Several Perspectives, at French Cultural Centre, Nairobi.
