= Nikita Kering =

Kenyan musician

Nikita Kering' Kering
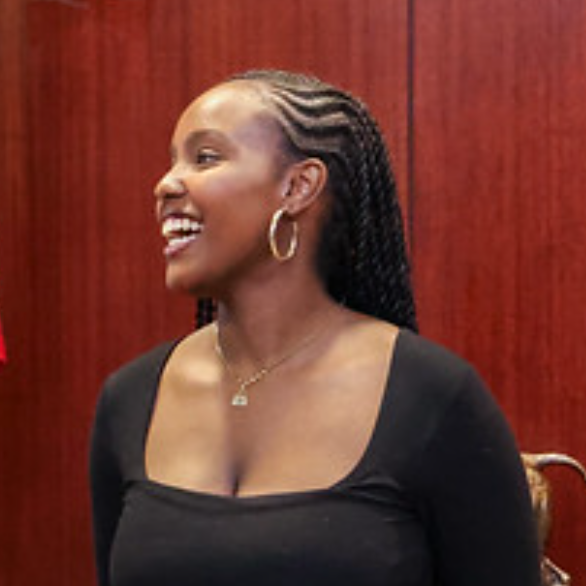
- in May 2025 at the US Embassy in Nairobi

Background information
- Also known as: Omondi's
- Born: Nikita Chepchumba Kering'; 26 February 2002 (age 24); Nairobi, Kenya
- Occupations: Musician; model
- Years active: 2012–present
- Label: EmPawa Africa

Nikita Chepchumba Kering' (born 26 February 2002) is a Kenyan musician, actress and media personality.

== Early life and education ==
Kering' was born on 26 February 2002 in Nairobi. She is the fourth born in a family of five. She attended Riara Springs Academy, Kilimani Junior Academy and Brookhouse International School where she completed her A-level studies from a partial scholarship, given to support her musical career.

== Career ==
She started her career at an early age. In 2012, during an album launch by Emmy Kosgey, she sang to a huge audience, and was critically acclaimed for her performance.

Nikita applied to the 2019 EmPawa Africa 3-week masterclass for emerging independent artistes called emPawa100, and was selected to undergo the international training and mentoring program. She became a finalist during the contest, but was deemed too young to compete at the highest stage; nonetheless it brought her to the limelight and there her career began. In the emPawa100 masterclass, Nikita won an award of $3,000 in funding which she used to shoot the video for her single Tragedy.

After the success of her song, Ex, she was also privileged to perform at Alliance High School on 6 November 2021.

== Awards ==
- 2018 Pulse Music Video Awards (PMVA) for Best New Artiste
- 2019 All Africa Music Awards for Best Female Artiste in Eastern Africa
- 2019 All Africa Music Awards for Revelation of the African Continent
- 2021 All Africa Music Awards for Best RnB and Soul Artist
- 2021 All Africa Music Awards for Best Female Artiste East Africa
