= George Ramogi =

Kenyan musician (1945–1997)

Kenyan musician, George Ramogi

George Ramogi (1945–1997) was a Kenyan musician, who empowered the traditional luo benga and rumba genre of music. Ramogi was known for his spur of the good life and his notable appearances at bars and clubs in western Kenya-Nyanza region. During the beginning of his career. Ramogi is believed to have been the real force behind “benga” as a genre.

== Biography ==
It was in 1965 that Ramogi and colleagues started the Luo Sweet Band, later changed to Continental Kilo Jazz Band (or C.K. Jazz). The nucleus of this group had been performing together, on and off, right up to Ramogi’s death at the age of 52 in 1997. Ramogi married Rosalia Kiayi, and later on a second wife, Bellah Ajode.

In 1994, a small group of Kenyans in the United States pooled their resources to bring Ramogi and band to the US to perform. The "Safari" CD, recorded in the US, is an outgrowth of that tour and contains praise songs for several of the individuals who organised the tour. The cassette contains more songs from the same recording session with slightly better audio quality.

Ramogi was a vivid story teller. In 'Ajali ya Sondu', he recounts a road accident in which a lorry killed many. In 1969, Argwings-Kodhek died in a road accident and Ramogi immortalized him in 'Argwings-Kodhek Onindo'. When a group of fishermen perished in Lake Victoria, he immortalized them in 'Rapar Jonam'.

Ramogi has also been recognised through his recordings with other Kenyan musicians such as Were Carey, Ochieng Kabaselleh, Daniel Owino Misiani and Tom Kodiyo. He created C.K Dumbe Dumbe Jazz band in response to the popular Zairean group Orchestre Lipua Lipua. Dumbe Dumbe is a Luo word for the children playing in the rain (nyithindo go dumbe dumbe).

On December 8, 1997, Ramogi succumbed to a short illness and was buried in his home, Weta Kamwala. Tom Kodiyo and Jimmy Likembe immortalized him in the song 'Rapar George Ramogi' with Orchestre Dumbe Dumbe.
