= Gloria Muliro =

- Born: Gloria Muliro; 1 April 1980 (age 46); Emanyinga, Vihiga County
- Genre: Gospel
- Occupations: Musician, motivational speaker
- Instrument: Vocals
- Years active: 2005–present
- Label: GloriamuliroMuzik
- Website: gloriamuliro.org

Gloria Owendi, commonly referred to as Gloria Muliro (born 1 April 1980), is a Kenyan Gospel musician and songwriter. In 2005, she released her first studio album, titled Omwami Aletsa (The Lord is Coming). As of 2013, Muliro had four albums to her name, the most successful being Kibali (Mandate), which has the popular song "Sitolia" (I Won't Cry) featuring Willy Paul. The album earned her six Groove Awards nominations. She went on to receive the Female Artist of the Year award at the eighth Groove Awards, an event attended by the President of Kenya, Uhuru Kenyatta.

== Early life ==
Muliro sang with her mother and her siblings together in Sunday school and the school choir. At Maranatha Faith Assemblies, Rolland Esese and the late Stanley Mtambo introduced her to live band music and walked her through the training.

== Career ==
Muliro first came into the limelight in 2005 when she recorded her first album, Omwami Aletsa (My God will surely come), which received massive airplay especially on local radio stations. She has three more albums to her name.

Several of her single tracks have hit the airwaves in Kenya and beyond East Africa, including "Sitolia", "Follow you", "Kando", "Msaidizi", "Matokeo", "Kitanzi", and "NdiyoYako".

== Other work ==
Muliro began Gloria Ministries in 2001. The group is involved in helping children through the Gloria Children's Home.

In 2016, Muliro founded Msaidizi Africa Initiatives, a group which aims to provide mentorship for up-and-coming gospel musicians.

== Awards and recognition ==
Muliro has received great recognition and has won several awards and nominations in Kenya and Africa, as best female artist.

She was a 2016 Kora Awards nominee in the category of inspirational music.

== Marriage ==
Gloria recently remarried many years after divorcing he former husband. Her new husband, Evans Sabwami, is a pastor, an engineer and a philanthropist. He is a Kenyan with US citizenship. Gloria relocated to New York to be with her husband.

== Discography ==
- Mwami Aletsa (2005), in Luhya, her native language
- Sitolia
- Follow You
- Msaidisi
