= Toxic Lyrikali =

Kenyan hiphop artist

Timothy Omondi
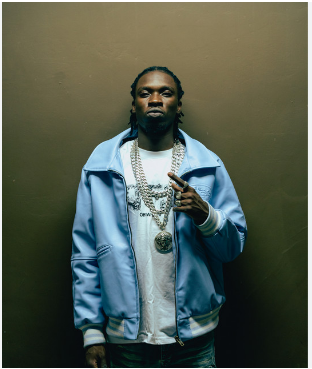
- Born: 23 November 1995 (age 30)
- Other name: Toxic Lyrikali
- Citizenship: Kenyan
- Years active: 2022-Present
- Known for: Singing
- Style: Kenyan hiphop
- Website: toxiclyrikali.com

Timothy Omondi, commonly known by his stage name Toxic Lyrikali is a Kenyan rapper, songwriter, hip hop artist and cultural sensation, who majorly sings in Sheng, Kiswahili and English.

== Early life ==
Timothy was born on 23rd November 1993 in Kayole suburbs in Nairobi City, Kenya. He was raised in Kayole, one of the cities busiest hubs. He had aspirations of becoming a footballer, but he switched to Music instead.

== Career ==
His started his career in 2022, by releasing his single 'Long story'. However, his career breakthrough came 2 years later, in November 2024, when he released his single 'Chinje', ( that roughly translates to slaughter in Kiswahili and Sheng), a viral hit that brought him nationwide recognition. His career started to really accelerate the following year when he released tracks like 'Backbencher', 'sick' , ' 'confirmation' and 'thugnificent'. In 2025, he was named among the top listened artists in Kenya. He later built the Mboka Doba Music label to empower local artists. In 2025, he was awarded the best rapper award at the RadioTV 254 awards especially for his single 'Chinje'.

== Popular tracks ==
1. Chinje
2. Back Bencher
3. Hate
4. Thugnificent
5. Sick
6. Mfisadi
