= Monski =

Kenyan hip hop rapper, singer and songwriter (born 1994)

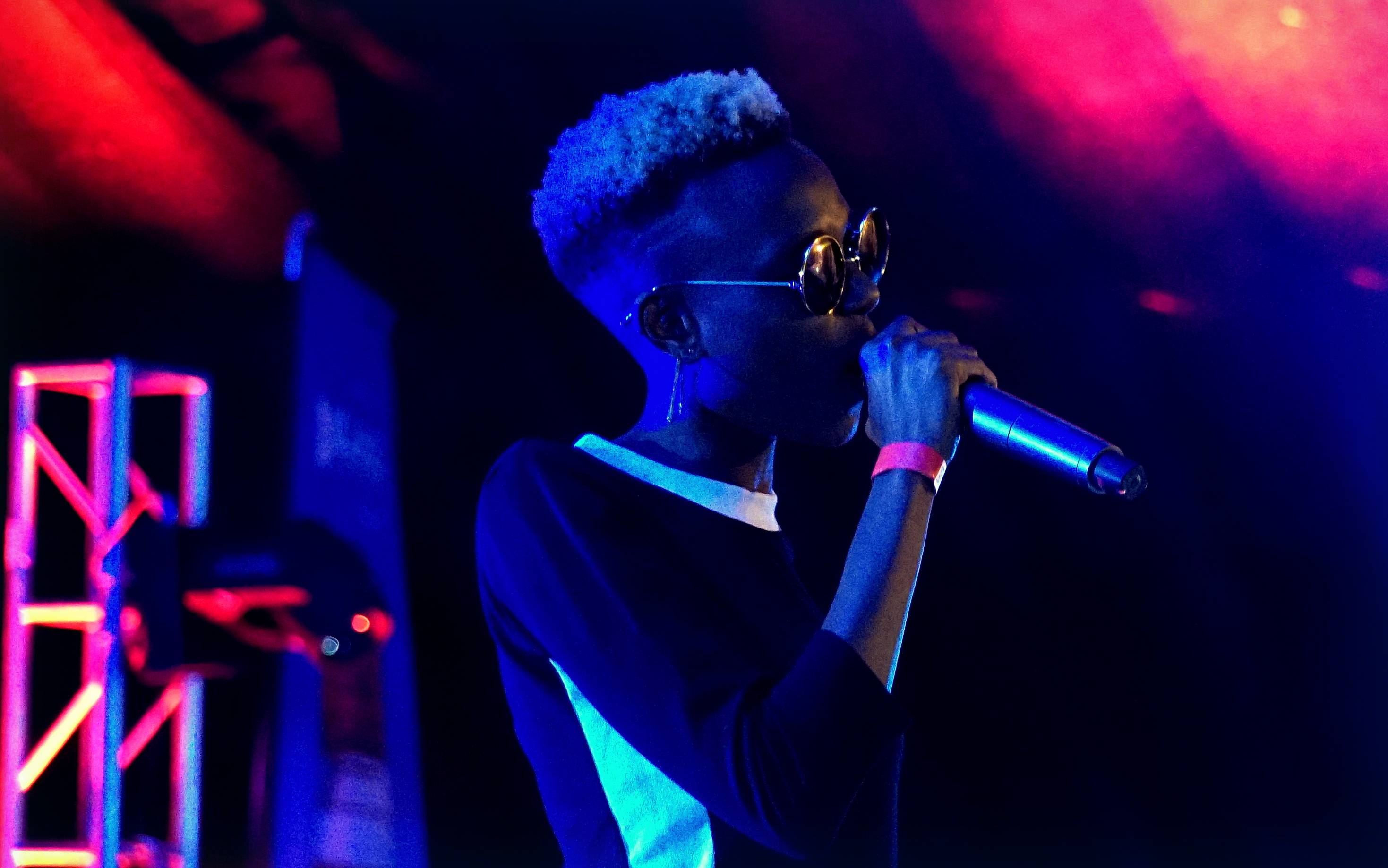
- Monski performing on stage

Background information
- Born: Sarah Mukethe Kiatine; 8 February 1994 (age 32); Nairobi, Kenya
- Genres: Hip hop
- Occupations: Rapper; singer; songwriter
- Years active: 2014–present
- Label: Independent

Sarah Mukethe Kiatine (born 8 February 1994), better known by her stage name Monski, is a Kenyan hip hop rapper, singer and songwriter. She was crowned as the Unkut Hip-hop Award best female artist of the year in 2019.

== Early life ==
Monski was born in Nairobi, Kenya, in a speeding taxi on the way to Pumwani Hospital. She is ethnically Akamba and was orphaned at a young age. Monski studied at Baba Dogo primary school, St Benedict primary school and Beadom Primary School in Nairobi, then went on to attend Kyangala high school in Machakos, where she discovered her rapping ability and honed her talent, pursuing music as a career after high school. This was after trying a series of employment positions that she termed "not her fit".

== Career ==
Her recording career began in 2014 after she recorded and uploaded a set of demos on SoundCloud; receiving positive reviews and requests from a growing fan base to release more and was soon booking gigs while also getting airplay from Kenyan hip-hop radio shows. In 2017, Pulse Magazine (Standard Media Kenya) listed her as one of the 'hip hop freshmen artists to look out for next year. She was the first Kenyan female rapper to perform at the annual Nyege Nyege Festival in Uganda. Monski describes her music as raw wordplay rap and experimental, mixing oldschool hiphop and new school sounds. In 2019 she was selected as one of Mr Eazis empawa 100 artist, a talent incubation initiative to nurture and support up-and-coming artistes in Africa. In December 2020 she released a debut Album Gold.
