= Daniel Owino Misiani =

Tanzanian-born Kenya-musician (1940 – 2006)

- Also known as: D.O. Misiani
- Born: 22 February 1940; Nyamagongo, Mara Region, Tanzania
- Died: 17 May 2006 (aged 66) Kisumu, Kisumu County, Kenya
- Genres: Benga; soukous
- Occupations: Singer; guitarist
- Years active: 1965–2006

Daniel Owino Misiani (22 February 1940 – 17 May 2006) was a Tanzanian-born musician based in Kenya, where he led the Shirati Jazz collective. He was known as the "King of History" in Kenya; overseas and in Tanzania, he was known as "the grandfather of benga", which he pioneered.

== Early life and career ==
Misiani was born in Nyamagongo, a quiet village just north of Shirati in Mara Region, Tanzania, close to the eastern shore of Lake Victoria and the border with Kenya. His parents were singers, but opposed his choice of a musical career on religious grounds. Nevertheless, he moved to Kenya in the 1960s to be a musician. He first recorded with the Victoria Boys in 1965. The band changed its name many times before becoming popular as the Shirati Jazz band. Misiani sang mostly in the Dholuo and Swahili languages. He is known as a pioneering contributor to the Benga music genre. During his long career, he released numerous recordings, with some international releases. He was imprisoned on several occasions for lyrics that were perceived as crossing the line into political criticism.

One of his sons, Robert Misiani, pursued a career as a hip-hop musician under the stage name Gun B. Robert and was best known for the hit "Nampenda", a collaboration with Pilipili. Robert died on 20 October 2007, due to illness.

== Death and legacy ==
Misiani died on 17 May 2006 in a road traffic accident at an accident hotspot in Kisumu, on the highway to Kakamega, in a crash between a minibus and a public transport van in which many others were injured. At time of his death, aged 66, he was still an active performer. Misiani, who was polygamous, had two wives (Felista and Beatrice) with 14 children.

After the death of Daniel Owino Misiani, the leadership of his band Shirati Jazz was taken over by his wife and long-time band member Queen Babito (Beatrice Atieno Owino).

== Discography ==
- Benga Blast! / Daniel Owino Misiani and Shirati Band (c1989, Virgin Records America)

=== As a contributing artist ===
- The Rough Guide to the Music of Kenya and Tanzania (1996, World Music Network)

== See also ==
- Luo people of Kenya and Tanzania
- Mara Region
