= Okatch Biggy =

Kenyan musician (1954-1997)

- Birth name: Elly Okatch Otieno
- Born: 1954 Gem, Siaya District
- Origin: Kenya
- Died: December 18, 1997 (aged 42–43) Agah Khan Hospital Kisumu
- Genres: Benga music
- Occupation: Musician
- Instrument(s): Vocals, drums
- Labels: Biggy Sounds Production
- Formerly of: Orch Super Heka Heka

Elly Mathayo Okatch, better known as Okatch Biggy (1954–1997) was a Kenyan benga musician. His first album Helena Wang'e Dongo, released in 1992, brought him into the limelight.

== Early life ==
Okatch (Okatch Biggy) was a Kenyan musician born in 1954 in Ujimbe, Sirembe Sublocation, Northwest-Gem location, Gem, Siaya County Nyanza Kenya. At age 21, Okatch tried to get into boxing as a career at the Railways Club in Kisumu. He was named "Biggy" as he was larger in appearance.

=== Kiwiro Jazz BAnd ===
Due to boxing being a threat to his life, Biggy, through his neighbour, Juma Odundo, got interested in Music after the practising with the band. He later joined the band as a drummer for a short stay and later moved to Kiwiro Jazz Band led by John Otonde. At Kiwiro, Biggy had several compositions, namely: Eliza Anyango, Angeline and later a super hit song, Dinnah Kalando. Misunderstandings later came as a result of the song Dinnah Kalando as this was to be credited to his name as other songs have been. He later left the group and joined Shirati Jazz led by Owino Misiani as a Drummer

=== Super Heka Heka ===
The first song composed by the band after its formation in Kisii at Gussi Night Club was a composition sponsored by PSI, Population Services International led by Ogonji wuod Andare. This song, UKIMWI, was composed by PSI Team, and Heka Heka did a marvelous job. Other songs in the album include: Chuo to Chuo Duto original, Joseph Yonga and Harus

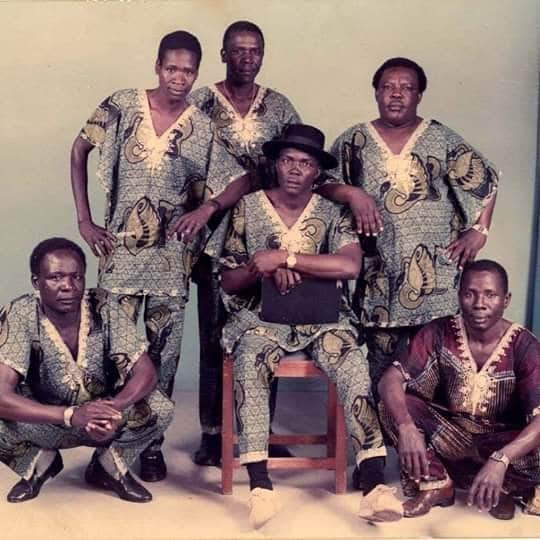
Ouma wuod gi Bala Jasuba, Olang'o Paul, Owiti Ahuja Jakajulu Adwera Okello jaugana mwalo, Aton, seated is Biggy wuod nya Bungu

Original members of the band included : Okello Adwera (bass guitar), Paul Olang'o (vocalist), Ochieng Viva (vocalist & composer), Dick Ouma 'Wuod Gi Mbala Jasuba'(Rhythm Guitar & vocals), Owiti Ahuja (Solo guitar), Bingwa (drummer) and Okatch (founder of the band). They were later joined by Oginga Wuod Awasi.

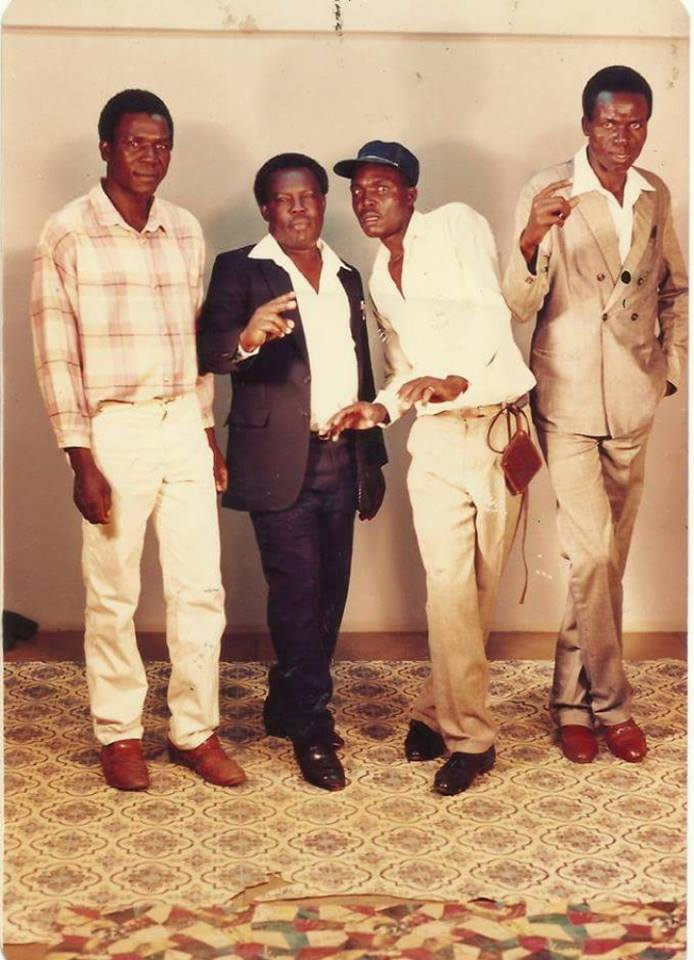

While in Kisumu, a few rich friends and lovers of his music like; Prof. Francis Owino Rew, Hosea Songa and Oduor Leo organized a fundraising and the resultant cash was used to buy Biggy new musical instruments to start up his band.

His personal approach and singing style drew fans. Kisumu Junction Inn was the center for this music. The band's popularity later spread across Kenya.

For the two years his music career peaked, Benga maestro Okatch Biggy bestrode the entertainment industry like a colossus.

Between 1995 and 1997, the artiste gave Benga music a new meaning and went ahead to snatch its control from legend Owino Misiani whose fame spanned Kenya and Tanzania.

Biggy stole the limelight after a prolonged lull in Benga, which saw kingpins like Ochieng Nelly, Collela Mazee, Awino Lawi, Ochieng Kabasellah, George Ramogi, and Ouma Omore take a beating from the invasion of the local scene by Congolese music.

His seismic beats and striking compositions laced with words that bordered on the lewd earned him a special place in the hearts of fans in Kisumu, Mombasa and Nairobi where he staged most of his shows.

At the time of his death on 18 December 1997, Biggy and his Super Heka Heka Band had recorded five albums and mentored young upcoming artists like Aluoch Jamaranda, Dolla Kabari, Oginga wuod Awasi, Jerry Jalamo, Ogonji Jaimbo, and Otieno Small among others.

== Discography ==
=== Studio albums ===
- Ukimwi
- Hellena
- Dorina
- Nyathi Nyakach
- Okello Jabondo

=== Posthumous albums ===
- Adhiambo Nyakobura
