= Musa Juma =

Kenyan musician

Musa Juma Mumbo (December 6, 1968 – March 15, 2011) was a Kenyan singer, musician, and songwriter who played rumba and Benga. He was the bandleader, guitarist and composer for Orchestra Limpopo International. Most of his music was sung in Dholuo. He also sang in Kiswahili and English, and many of his songs are a fusion of Luo and Congolese musical styles.

== Early life and career ==
Musa Juma Mumbo was born in Usonga, Siaya District (now Siaya County). He was born to the third wife of his father, a policeman who had a total of 18 children. He grew up in Homa Bay, and began singing and playing instruments at a young age. His first instruments were guitars and drums made from tins and strings. Mumbo ventured into music immediately after completing high school, a difficult decision because music was not paying in the 1980s in Kenya and it was not considered as a career. However, Musa's determination could not be stopped by the societal view of music and he pursued his talents and interests. After a long struggle, MJ and his brother Omondi Tony (Anthony Omondi Mumbo) launched their band, Orchestra Limpopo International. Together they started playing rumba in small clubs in Nairobi and Kisumu. Their performances and compositions saw Orchestra Limpopo International gradually rise into national fame. Years later, the two brothers would separate and Omondi Tony turned to a solo career. Juma thrilled his fans with rumba style music laced with Congolese styles.

Musa Juma recruited and signed musicians to form the group, including singers and guitarists from Congo, Tanzania, and Kenya. Some members of Orchestra Limpopo International who later pursued notable music careers include are John Junior and Prezda Igwe Bandason.

Some of the most popular songs by Musa Juma were "Hera Mudho", "Hera Mwandu", "Siaya Kababa", "Clackson", "Ufisadi", "Mercelina", and "Freddy". He released eight albums, the last of them being titled Lake Victoria.

During his career he toured various countries. Only weeks before his death in 2011, he and his band had a tour in the United States. Upon arrival, he scheduled what was meant to be Three Major Homecoming concerts with each taking place in Nairobi, Kisumu and Mombasa respectively. Even though the tickets sold out,the concerts were not a success as earlier anticipated due to Musa's frail appearance. His best friend Fred Afune tried to persuade him to postpone the concerts, something Musa was opposed to as he had missed his Kenyan fans. He proceeded with the shows which later tuned tragic as he could not finish his performance due to health complications. He was then rushed to Mombasa Hospital for treatment .

== Personal life ==
He died of severe pneumonia on Tuesday March 15, 2011 at Mombasa Hospital. He was survived by his wife, Winnie and a young daughter, Victoria Amanda Awuor Juma.
