= Bahati (singer) =

Kenyan singer and songwriter

- Born: Kevin Mbuvi Kioko; 7 July 1992; Kenya
- Education: Nakeel Boys' High School; St Theresa's Boys' High School in Eastleigh
- Occupations: Singer; Songwriter; politician
- Years active: 2013–present

Kevin Mbuvi Kioko, popularly known by his stage name Bahati, is a Kenyan singer and songwriter and former parliamentary candidate. His latest album, Love Like This, was released in 2021. He is also known by his nickname, 'Mtoto wa Mama'.

== Early life and education ==
Bahati was born in 1994 in Kenya. He lost his mother when he was just 7 years old and was raised at ABC Children's Home in the Mathare slums in Nairobi. He attended Mercury Academy for primary education. For secondary school education, he attended Nakeel Boys' High School in Rongai, Kajiado County and St Theresa's Boys' High School in Eastleigh, Nairobi County, where he completed his KCSE in the latter in 2011 and got a C+ grade.

== Career ==
=== Music ===
Bahati's singing traces its roots to his high school days at St Theresa's Boys when he represented the school in the national music festivals. Siku ya Kwanza, his first song, was recorded in 2012 and eventually became part of his first album, Barua za Bahati. The album also comprised his breakout hit, Mama.

While he initially gained media recognition singing gospel songs, Bahati has since switched to contemporary secular music.

In 2015, Bahati opened his own recording studio called EMB Records, EMB being short for 'Eastlands Most Beloved'. He closed it down in 2020 citing frustrations and a lack of support from fellow artists.

In 2021, Bahati released his latest album, Love Like This. It features the popular song Pete Yangu featuring Nadia Mukami.

=== Filmography ===
In 2024, together with his fiancee Diana, launched a new reality series on Netflix, The Bahati's Empire.

=== Politics ===
In 2022, Bahati announced that he would be venturing into politics, contesting for the Mathare constituency parliamentary seat on a Jubilee Party ticket. Jubilee Party was part of the Azimio coalition. The coalition aimed to front only one candidate per constituency, as its constituent parties agreed not to field candidates in each other's stronghold areas. As a result, Bahati was initially denied the ticket until the zoning procedure was dropped allowing him to run. He came third in the elections held on 9 August garnering 8,166 votes.

After failing to clinch the Mathare MP seat, Bahati has hinted at running for a gubernatorial position in the next elections.

== Personal life ==
Bahati is engaged to Diana Marua and, together, they have three children. They are also foster parents to a boy they adopted from the children's home Bahati grew up in. Bahati is also a father to another child from a past relationship with ex-girlfriend Yvette Obura.

== Awards ==
- 2013 Groove Awards – Best Upcoming Artist
- 2013 Mwafaka Awards – Collabo of the Year (for the song Wangu featuring Mr Seed)
- 2014 All Africa Music Awards (AFRIMMA) – Best Gospel Artist
- 2014 Mdundo Awards – Best Gospel Song (for the song Machozi)
- 2015 Groove Awards – Male Artist of the Year
- 2015 Groove Awards – Song of the Year, Video of the Year, Most Downloaded Skiza Tune of the Year (for the song Barua)
