= Benga music =

Music genre from Kenya

Benga
- Stylistic origins: Luo music, Kamba, Congolese rumba and Maina Mwangi Kikuyu music
- Cultural origins: Late 1940s - Late 1960s, Kenya

Regional scenes
- Kenya • Tanzania

Other topics
- Muziki wa dansi; Ngoma music; Singeli

Benga is a genre of Kenyan popular music. It evolved between the late 1940s and late 1960s, in Kenya's capital city of Nairobi. In the 1940s, the African Broadcasting Service in Nairobi aired a steady stream of Congolese rumba and finger-style guitar, South African kwela and various kinds of Cuban dance music that heavily influenced the emergence of benga. There were also popular folk songs of Tanzania and Kenya's Luo peoples that formed the base of benga creation.

== Luo, Kamba & Kenyan Modern Benga ==
The Luo of Kenya have long played an eight-string lyre called nyatiti, and guitarists from the area sought to imitate the instrument's syncopated melodies. In benga, the electric bass guitar is played in a style reminiscent of the nyatiti. As late as the turn of the twentieth century, this bass in nyatiti supported the rhythm essential in transmitting knowledge about society through music. Opondo Owenga of Gem Yala, the grandfather of Odhiambo Siangla, was known for employing music as a means of teaching the history of the Luo. The father of the popular Luo benga is George Ramogi (Omogi Wuod Weta) and CK Jazz. He helped the benga enthusiasts by recording their benga music in different labels in the capital city of Nairobi. Dr. Mengo of Victoria Jazz was a protege of George Ramogi.

In 1967, the first major benga band, Shirati Jazz, was formed by Daniel Owino Misiani. The group launched a string of hits that were East Africa's biggest songs throughout the 1970s and 1980s. Shirati Jazz's biggest rival was Victoria Jazz, formed in 1972 by Ochieng Nelly Mengo and Collela Mazee. Despite many personnel changes, Victoria Jazz remained popular throughout the 1970s, when the Voice of Kenya radio station pushed an onslaught of East African pop. Victoria C Band of Awino Lawi was one of the splinter group of Victoria Jazz.

1997 saw the death of three prominent Luo benga artists, Okatch Biggy of Heka Heka Band, George Ramogi and Prince Jully. The Jolly Boys Band of Prince Jully was taken over by his wife Princess Jully and she has since been a leading female benga musician.

Another famous benga band Migori Super Stars was formed in the mid-70s and was led by Musa Olwete which later split to form another popular benga band Migori Super Stars C with musicians such as Joseph Ochola (Kasongo Polo Menyo), Onyango Jamba, Ochieng' Denge denge and others.

More modern benga artists include Kapere Jazz Band and Ogwang Lelo Okoth. Dola Kabarry and Musa Juma emerged in the 2000s. Musa Juma died in 2011. Known as MJ, he developed a form of benga that incorporated elements of rumba. He influenced musicians including John Junior, Ogonji, Madanji, and his brother Omondi Tonny.

Currently, Odhiambo Tusker of Malela Kings Band has gained popularity for Luo benga music.

There are also other benga artists based countries other than Kenya, such as the American/Kenyan group Extra Golden.

=== Modern Benga ===
Benga has grown over the years as the artists keep on improving.

Modern benga music combines traditional benga beats with pop, jazz and afro beats in a process called bengafusion. It is sung by Kenyan artists.

Modern benga musicians include Prince Indah, Ismamoma, Abongo Jakabwana, Maxwell Mwalimu and Kelel Jazz.
