= E-Sir =

Kenyan rapper (1981–2003)

- Born: Issah Mmari Wangui; May 20, 1981; Nairobi, Kenya
- Origin: South C, Nairobi, Kenya
- Died: March 16, 2003 (aged 21) Rift Valley, Kenya
- Genres: Kenyan hip hop; kapuka rap
- Occupations: Rapper; lyricist; poet
- Years active: 2001–2003
- Label: Ogopa Deejays

Issah Mmari Wangui (May 20, 1981 – March 16, 2003), better known by his stage name E-Sir, was a Kenyan hip hop artist.

== Life and Career ==
He was the elder brother to fellow Kenyan rapper Habib. He was famous for his deft lyrical ability and command of the Swahili language. The popularity of his music disproved the myth that Kenyan music could never compete with imported pop. Even long after his death, he is still widely regarded as one of the best rappers to have emerged on the Kenyan hip hop scene.

In 2017, he got nominated for the Mdundo Awards for Most Downloaded Hip-Hop Artist.

== Death ==
Wangui died in a car accident at 21 in 2003. Boomba Train was his last hit song.

== Legacy ==
Nairobi Governor Johnson Sakaja proposed the renaming of a road in South C in honour of E-Sir.

== See also ==
- List of Kenyan rappers
