= Luo Union =

Luo Union may refer to:

- Luo Union (Welfare Organisation) - A defunct East African welfare organisation that united Luo peoples
- Luo Union F.C. - A defunct Kenyan football club organised by the welfare organisation
- Gor Mahia FC - A Kenyan football club
