= Carscallen =

Carscallen is a surname. Notable people with the surname include:

- Alexander Augustus Williamson Carscallen (1844–1907), Canadian politician
- Arthur Carscallen (1879–1964), American pastor, missionary, and linguist
- Henry Carscallen (1845–1906), Canadian politician
- Susan Carscallen (born 1955), Canadian former ice skater
- Thomas George Carscallen (1842–1917), Canadian politician
