= Richard Samson Odingo =

Kenyan Climate Scientist (1935–2021)

- Born: March 7, 1935; Nyanza Province, Kenya Colony
- Died: June 12, 2021 (aged 86); Nairobi, Kenya
- Education: University of Liverpool, London University, Makerere University College
- Known for: Vice chairman of the Intergovernmental Panel on Climate Change (IPCC) when it was awarded the Nobel Peace Prize in 2007
- Scientific career
- Fields: Agricultural geography, Climate Science
- Institutions: University of Nairobi

Richard Samson Odingo (March 7, 1935 – June 12, 2021) was a Kenyan scientist who worked as the vice chairman of the Intergovernmental Panel on Climate Change (IPCC) when it was awarded the Nobel Peace Prize in 2007 with Al Gore. He held this position for more than 20 years prior. Odingo was awarded full Professorship at the University of Nairobi in Geography in 1987. He has been a consultant of several international agencies including multiple United Nations Agencies and has taught for many years at the University of Nairobi.

== Background ==
Richard Odingo was born on March 7, 1935, in the former Nyanza Province of Kenya Colony.Coming from a humble background, His education advanced in part due to a government scholarship which allowed him to attend secondary school in Kakamega Town. He attended Makerere University College then London University. He undertook his postgraduate studies at the University of Liverpool where he obtained his PhD in Agricultural geography in 1963.

== Career ==
In 1965 ,Odingo was appointed Lecturer in Geography at Makerere University College before moving to the University College in Nairobi. At the University of Nairobi he climbed the ranks over the years, becoming a Senior Lecturer in 1969, Associate Professor in 1975 and Full Professor in 1987. Odingo's main research interests include Agricultural Geography, Climatology, Environmental remote sensing and Geographic Information Systems (GIS). Some of his contributions include chairing the Inter-Ministerial Committee on Climate Change Activities in Kenya as well as consultancies with local and international organisations such as Economic Commission of Africa, International Development Research Centre, Food and Agriculture Organization, and the United Nations Development Program. In 1973, Odingo participated in a Nobel workshop on Building of Dams and Schistosomiasis in Stockholm. In the late 1980s, Odingo was appointed the Vice chairman of the Intergovernmental Panel on Climate Change (IPCC), a position he held until 2008. In 2007, the IPCC was awarded the Nobel Peace Prize jointly with Al Gore Jr, "for their efforts to build up and disseminate greater knowledge about man-made climate change, and to lay the foundations for the measures that are needed to counteract such change." In 2009, he received the World Environment Prize (Premio Gambrinus Giusseppe Mazzotti Prize) in Italy.
