= Geography of food =

Branch of human geography

The geography of food is a field of human geography. It focuses on patterns of food production and consumption on the local to global scale. Tracing these complex patterns helps geographers understand the unequal relationships between developed and developing countries in relation to the innovation, production, transportation, retail and consumption of food. It is also a topic that is becoming increasingly charged in the public eye. The movement to reconnect the 'space' and 'place' in the food system is growing, spearheaded by the research of geographers.

== History ==
Spatial variations in food production and consumption practices have been noted for thousands of years. In fact, Plato commented on the destructive nature of agriculture when he referred to the soil erosion from the mountainsides surrounding Athens, stating "[In previous years] Athens yielded far more abundant produce. In comparison of what then was, there are remaining only the bones of the wasted body; all the richer and softer parts of the soil having fallen away, and the mere skeleton of the land being left". Societies beyond those of ancient Greece have struggled under the pressure to feed expanding populations. The people of Easter Island, the Maya of Central America and most recently the inhabitants of Montana have been experiencing similar difficulties in production due to several interconnected factors related to land and resource management. These events have been extensively studied by geographers and other interested parties (the study of food has not been confined to a single discipline, and has received attention from a huge range of diverse sources).

Modern geographers initially focused on food as an economic activity, especially in terms of agricultural geography. It was not until recently that geographers have turned their attention to food in a wider sense: "The emergence of an agro-food geography that seeks to examine issues along the food chain or within systems of food provision derives, in part, from the strengthening of political economy approaches in the 1980s".

== Overlapping areas of study ==
Food has received attention from both the physical sciences and the social sciences because it is a bridge between the natural and social worlds. Some of the earliest numerical data about food production come from bureaucratic sources linked to the ancient civilizations of Ancient Egypt and the Roman Empire. Traders have also been influential in documenting food networks. Early Indian merchants and traders mapped the location of trading posts associated with food production nodes.

== Food production ==
Food production was the first element of food to receive extensive attention from geographers in the field of cultural geography, particularly in agricultural geography.

Globally, the production of food is unequal. This is because there are two main components involved in sustenance production that are also distributed irregularly. These components are the environmental capacity of the area, and the human capacity. Environmental capacity is its ability 'to accommodate a particular activity or rate of an activity without unacceptable impact'. The climate, soil types, and availability of water affect it. Human capacity, in relation to food production, is the size of the population and the amount of agricultural skill within that population. When these two are at ideal levels and partnered with financial capital, the creation of intense agricultural infrastructure is possible, as the Green Revolution clearly portrays.

Simultaneously, the ability of a country to produce food is being severely impacted by a plethora of other factors:

Pests are becoming resistant to pesticides, or pesticides may be killing off the useful and necessary insects. Examples of this happening occur around the globe. Tanzania experienced a particularly horrible infection of armyworms in 2005. At the infections peak, there were over 1000 larvae per square meter. In 2009, Liberia experienced a state of emergency when invading African armyworm caterpillars began what became a regional food crisis. The caterpillars traveled through 65 towns and 20,000 people were forced to leave their homes, markets, and farms. Losses like this can cost millions to billions, depending on size and duration, and have severe effects on food security. The FAO has created an international team, the Plant Production and Protection Division, which is attempting to 'reduce reliance on pesticides' and 'demonstrate that pesticide use often can be reduced considerably without affecting yields or farmer profits' in these, and other hard-struck areas.

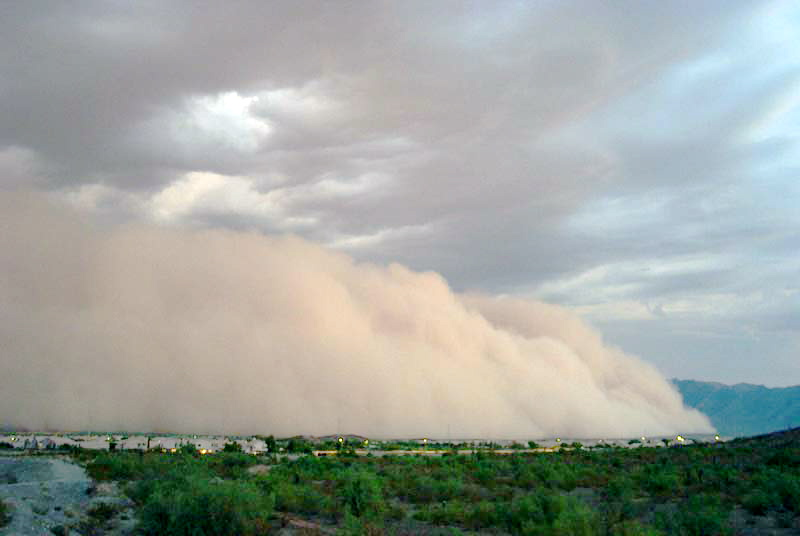
Aeolian wind erosion in Phoenix, Arizona, USA on 22 August 2003.

Water stress, desertification, and erosion are leading to loss of arable land. Agricultural practices use the bulk of the Earth's fresh water – up to 70 percent – and those numbers are predicted to rise by 50-100 percent by 2025. Countries are being forced to divert more water than ever before to irrigate their land. Hydroelectric dams and mega-canal projects are becoming the new standard for countries like Egypt that can no longer depend on rainfall or natural flood cycles. These water shortages are also causing a source of conflict between neighboring nations as they live with increasingly high levels of water scarcity. Policy responses to these events could be implemented in order to strengthen the socio-economic growth, human health statuses, and environmental sustainability of these areas. Combining current limitations with water and transitions from practices such as agroforestry and shifting cultivation makes land susceptible to aeolian erosion by weakening soil composition and exposing larger areas of land to destructive wind. Aeolian erosion largely effects deserted areas, reducing air quality, polluting water sources, and limiting fertility of nearby land.

Climate change is creating more extreme weather patterns, and agricultural practices are estimated to cause from 10 to 12 percent of greenhouses gas emissions. Warming will increase the previously mentioned rates of desertification and insect activity and agricultural zones near the equator may be lost. However, due to the uneven warming that will probably occur, higher latitudes are expected to warm up at faster rates than other areas of the globe. Scientists are now presenting the idea that areas in Canada and Siberia may become suitable for farming at the industrial scale, and that those areas will be able to account for any farmland that is lost at the equator. Conservative estimates place the shift of traditional crops (maize, grain, potatoes) northward at 50-70 kilometers (31–43 miles) a decade. It is also believed that non-traditional crops (berries, sunflowers, melons) could be established on the southern sides of these countries. Changes in climate may force humans to adapt, adopt new practices, and alter old habits to promote success in the uncertain age of climate change ahead.

== Food consumption ==
Criticisms of the industrialized food system regarding its inability to provide nutritious, ecologically sound, equitable food for the world's population has increased in recent history. Systems that are currently in place focus on providing relatively cheap food to millions, but often cost the Earth in terms of water and soil degradation, local food insecurity, animal welfare, rising obesity and health-related problems, and declining rural communities. Variations in diet and consumption practices on global and regional scales became the focus of geographers and economists with the vastly expanding population and widely publicized famines of the 1960s, and the food riots of 2007-2008 in 60 different countries. Due in part to these events, differences in the caloric intake of food and the composition of an average diet have been estimated and mapped for many countries since the 1960s.

Canada, USA, and Europe consume the highest amount of calories with an average per capita consumption of around 3400 calories daily. The recommended daily caloric intake for men and women living in these areas is 2500 and 2000 respectively. Studies focused on consumption patterns in these areas lay the blame for increased caloric intake on soft drink and fast food consumption, and decreased physical activity. Many developing countries are beginning to follow the leaders in rising caloric intake as they develop further due to increased availability of these high-impact items. Ballooning weight and associated health problems such as high blood pressure, high cholesterol, heart problems, and diabetes are being recorded in skyrocketing numbers.

Globally, consumption is still extremely uneven, with areas such as Sub-Saharan Africa still having some of the lowest rates of caloric intake per capita, often falling below the recommended levels. Much of this is due to lack of access of particular foods, which is a leading factor as to why much of the undernourished population is located in this region. In the world today, there are over 800 million people that are undernourished. The Democratic Republic of Congo holds the lowest average, at 1800 calories daily; however, averages do not represent the range of inequality between the best and worst fed people within a region. Currently, steps are being made to reduce caloric inequality. In parts of South Africa, the government has implemented a widespread electrification system featuring a free electricity allowance due to a study was conducted from 1991 to 2002 that found a positive increase in consumption habits within villages if given access to electricity. Access to electricity allowed for less time to be spent on menial tasks such as gathering firewood, and more time working on higher-level tasks that could increase income. In fact, villages often exceeded their electrical allowances.

== See also ==
- Local food
- Food security
- Right to food
- Food rescue
- Food speculation
