= Ayie =

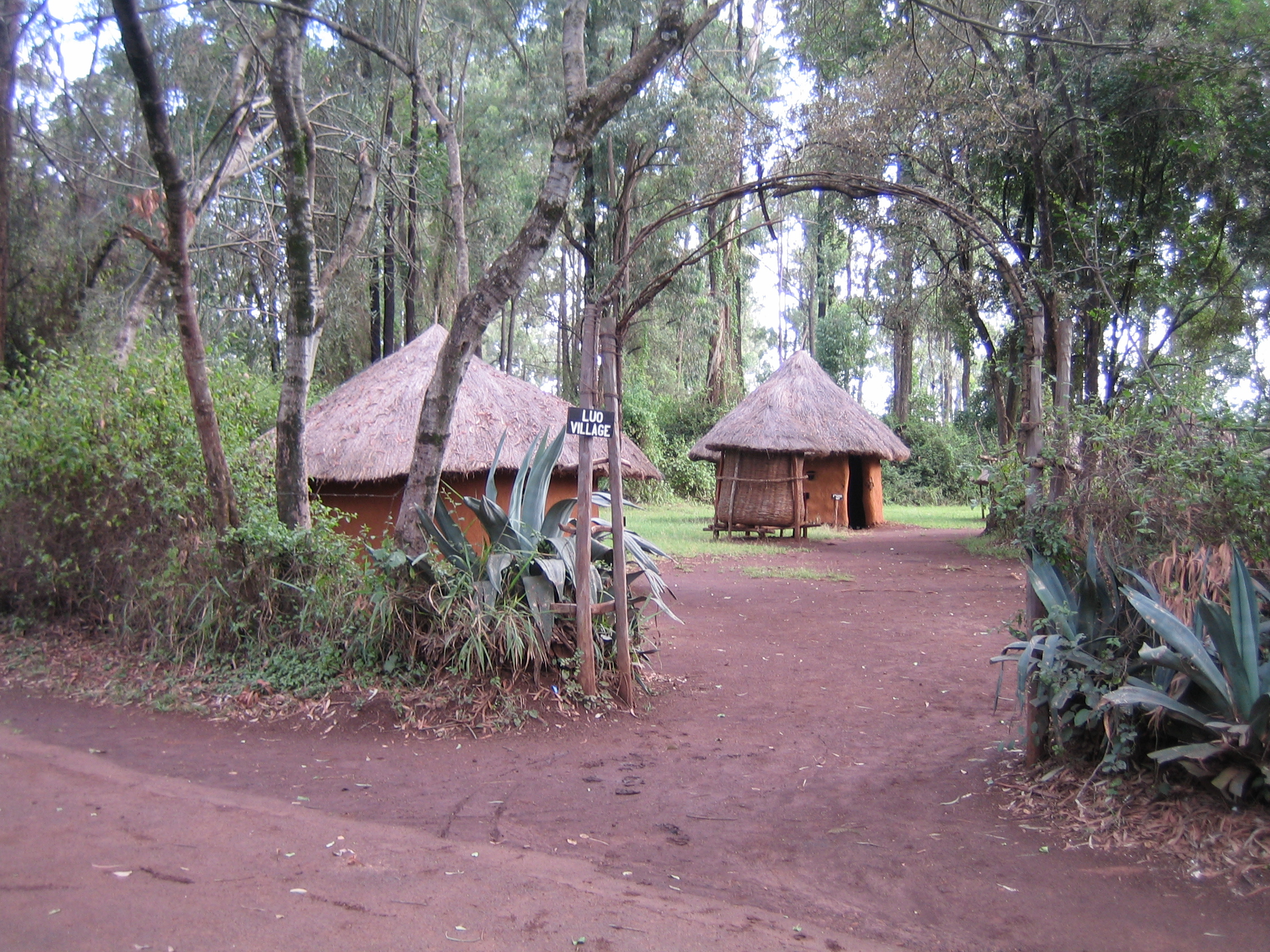
Ayie takes place in homesteads like these

Ayie is the first of two stages of a traditional marriage ceremony of the Luo tribe of Kenya and Tanzania. The ceremony involves the payment of a bride price by the groom to the mother of the bride. Ayie is a Dholuo word, which means "I agree", referring to the fact that the mother of the bride accepts the bride price and agrees for the marriage to take place.

Once the ceremony has taken place, the couple are considered to be married and the groom is at liberty to leave with the bride after the ceremony, although to complete the union a second bride price known as "keny", in the form of cattle, should be paid to the father of the bride not on the same day, but at a later date.

As polygamy or "doho" is permitted in Luo tradition, a man may carry out Ayie several times with different women, and all marriages are recognized as legal under the Kenyan or Tanzanian law governing traditional marriage. However, if he also carries out a civil or religious marriage ceremony in Kenya, he may not have more than one wife.

Ayie ceremony takes place at the home of the parents of the bride, after the groom has made a request and agreed with the bride on the date of the ceremony. Consent of the parents of the bride for the ceremony to take place is mandatory.

Other people who attend the Ayie ceremony include all wives of the father of the bride as well as her uncles who are from her father's side, together with their wives. Uncles from mother's side and their family members are not allowed to attend the Ayie ceremony. It is on the Ayie ceremony that a groom officially meets the parents of the bride for the first time; all other visits that could have taken place prior to the Ayie ceremony are unofficial and in some cases may attract disciplinary action on the groom. If a groom visits the parents of the bride but without the intention to pay Ayie during the visit, he may be considered undisciplined, as his action may be interpreted as arrogance or prematurely show off his relationship with the bride to her parents.

The amount of Ayie is fixed within a certain range throughout the Luo communities in Kenya (ruling bride price), and it increases from time to time, although the mother of the bride may negotiate a higher price whilst the groom may also negotiate a lower price.

Since in Luo tradition the bride price is recoverable upon divorce, it is usually unlikely for the mother of the bride to negotiate unreasonably higher price than the ruling price. This is because, in case of divorce, which is a rare happening among Luo couples-(as most Luo women are known to be faithful) the family of the bride would be able to refund the bride price, which may embarrass them.

During the Ayie ceremony the bride prepares food for the groom and feeds him in front of everyone to signify her acceptance as the groom's traditional bride and those who accompany him. Often, the food consists of poultry and beef served with "Kuon" (ugali) and "mchele" (rice) and other delicacies like "aliya" (smoked beef) and many more.
