= Sigweya =

Luo spoken-word performance

A sigweya is a solo spoken-word performance used by the Luo people to extol the values of a specific person or people. While commonly used at funerals to commemorate the deceased, a sigweya can also be performed to living people, such as at weddings and festivals.

== Context ==
The Luo constitute the second-largest ethnic group in Kenya. Within Luo culture, spoken-word performances are often used to express emotions, including in chode, performed between lovers, and nyono, performed by multiple people who are in mourning. The sigweya is most commonly compared to elegies and dirges, though it is not exclusively used to commemorate the deceased. Luo people believe that life begins and ends with immortality, from spirit (Dholuo: tipo) to body (ringre) and back to spirit. While the physical body dies, the spirit lives on, retaining the individual's identity. The spirit believed to eventually return to a body in the form of their descendent, and newborn Luo children will often be referred to by spirit names such as Nyatiegari (lit. 'great grandmother') due to the belief that they share the same spirit as a deceased relative or ancestor. The specific custom of performing a sigweya is believed to have started with Luo soldiers.

== Performances ==
While sigweya performances vary, they ordinarily consist of declamatory recitations chanted in a free rhythm, often with shows of significant emotion through both voice and physical movements; the lyrics reference the positive virtues of the person the sigweya is about. A sigweya is performed by a single person, without musical accompaniment; this has led to it being described as "a recitation exhibiting characteristics of song without being definitely song" and "poetic pronunciations and shouts". In the context of funerals, the lyrics will often comment first on the persons attributes; for example, beginning "chunye ler ka pi soko" (lit. 'your heart is as pure as water from a spring'). They will then discuss the continuation of life beyond human mortality, concluding with lyrics such as "tho iseloyo, tho ogol!" (lit. 'you have conquered death, dying be damned!') or "hail the buffalo!", referencing the person's spirit leaving the body and taking the form of a buffalo, a symbol of a brave hero in Luo culture.

A sigweya can only be performed by someone close to the person it is being sung about, who can share stories about their shared experiences and personal virtues as well as favourite stories about them. They can be performed by all genders, and while they are solo performances, multiple sigweya performances can take place during a gathering, in both planned and impromptu manners. People may interrupt a sigweya performance to comment or add on what has been said, or to provide their own tribute. Sigweya performances are often accompanied with dances or physical movements.

== Notable examples ==
Jaramogi Oginga Odinga performed a sigweya at the funeral of Jomo Kenyatta, the first President of Kenya. The former Prime Minister of Kenya, Raila Odinga, performed at the funerals of Daniel arap Moi and Otieno Kajwang.
