= Luo Union (welfare organisation) =

Defunct cultural welfare association in Kenya

- Predecessor: Multiple clan based unions
- Successor: Gor Mahia FC
- Formation: 1920s
- Founded at: Nairobi, Kenya Colony
- Dissolved: 1980
- Legal status: Defunct
- Headquarters: Kisumu

The Luo Union was a welfare organisation formed in Nairobi, Kenya, in the early 1920s. This organisation sought to create, expand and govern a general cultural identity among Luo people in East Africa. Luo people are a Nilotic ethnic group native to western Kenya and the Mara Region of northern Tanzania in East Africa. The Luo Union was one of several welfare organisations started during the colonial period in East Africa which aimed at building broad cultural unity. This organisation played a crucial role in creating a collective sense of identity and unity amongst Luo people after the Second World War. It was also an important medium of grassroots political support for African Nationalist movements in the 1950s. The Luo Union FC was the unions soccer club. This club would later become Gor Mahia FC, one of Kenya's best performing football clubs.

== History ==
The early 20th century witnessed mass migrations of people from their ethnic homelands to cities and farms across East Africa for work. The colonial government encouraged this migration from western Kenya as this part of the country was deemed unsuitable for European settlement. The former Nyanza and Western Provinces became labour reserves. Tens of thousands of people moved from these areas into Nairobi, Mombasa, Kampala and Dar es Salaam and various farms across the region. Early welfare associations were formed by various ethnic groups mainly along clan and location lines. Various associations formed by Luo language (Dholuo) speakers from Nyanza province united to form the Luo Union in Nairobi in the early 1920s. The welfare function of the Union was borne out of necessity as members and officials provided scarce social services to cater for funeral expenses, capital for businesses and fees for schooling. The Union received support from the colonial government which encouraged ethnic based organisations so long as they avoided politics.

In the mid 1940s, alumni of the Church Missionary Society (CMS) school at Maseno including Oginga Odinga, Walter Odede and Achieng Oneko called for a larger, better organised organisation that would unite the Luo community, giving them a common purpose and sense of achievement. The Union began to adopt a regional focus. In 1945, Oginga Odinga started the Luo Thrift and Trading Corporation (LUTATCO) as a self-help cooperative that aimed to uplift the economic status of the Luo people. Thousands of shares in LUTATCO were sold across Luo settlements across East Africa. The LUTATCO office in Kisumu was the first African owned building in the town. A printing press was also purchased which was used to publish African Nationalist newspapers including Achieng Oneko's vernacular newspaper Ramogi and Paul Ngei's radical newspaper Uhuru Wa Africa. LUTATCO became the economic wing of the Luo Union.

The Luo Union in Kampala was established in 1947 and was a strong organisation due to government support. The Kampala wing established schools and nurseries and organised soccer competitions and dances. By the early 1950s the Luo Union had greatly expanded. There were more than sixty branches across East Africa and more than 3,000 paying members. Some of the largest branches were in Mwanza, Dar es Salaam, and Kampala. As the Union grew and expanded its membership in the 1950s, Oginga Odinga's efforts were recognised and he was elected as the Chief (Ker) of the union. In 1957, Odinga resigned from this post in order to pursue politics. Despite the official apolitical stance, it was an important medium for grassroots support as many members and officials engaged in politics and mobilised the masses through union activities during the anti-colonial struggle and early post-independence period.

The Union continued to connect the growing Luo diaspora in East Africa, providing in some capacity, social and economic safety nets for members as well as opportunities to interact. These activities were encouraged by the colonial governments but were perceived as a threat in the post-independence period. Oginga Odinga resigned from his post as Vice President of Kenya and formed the Kenya People's Union, a left-leaning opposition political party, in 1966. Luo people gave this party and Odinga considerable support. The cultural identity and unity that was fostered by the Luo Union was perceived as being in conflict with the government. This perception worsened after the assassination of Tom Mboya, one of Kenya's founding fathers and an active union official, in 1969. This assassination was one of several events that led to anti-government sentiments amongst the Luo and a feeling of marginalisation. The Union fell out of favour with the government.

== Constitution ==
The Luo Union had a comprehensive constitution which captured its aims and mission. Key aspects of the constitution included the location of the Union headquarters (Kisumu), its membership, aims and objectives. The membership was liberal as it was open to all Luo adults as well as any other adult person other than Luo who lived with the Luo. The Aims and objectives were mainly welfare related. They also sought to safeguard positive aspects of Luo culture compatible with and conducive to modern civilisation whilst rejecting negative aspects of non-Luo customs.

== Achievements ==
The main achievements of the union were welfare related. Financial aid was provided to students for overseas education. Loans were also made available to union members through a money lending business. In Kampala, the Luo were the only other ethnic group other than the Baganda to own property and run businesses in Kampala East. African owned buildings were also constructed, notably the Ofafa Hall in Kisumu and the Ofafa Makingo Centre in Nairobi. The Union was also important for grassroots mobilisation of nationalist political parties during the Kenyan anti-colonial struggle. It provided financial aid to the Kenya African National Union (KANU) party and government. The Luo Union FC was the unions soccer club. This club won Kenya's top knockout football tournament, the FKF President's Cup, three times in the mid-1960s.

== Criticisms ==
The Union had constant organisational challenges which affected the business returns and prevented it from achieving all of its aims. The direct approach to dealing with welfare issues was also challenging as the organisation would be often overwhelmed by the need. In the pre-independence period, colonial authorities encouraged and supported the Luo Union as it was perceived to be loyal and reputable. Some union members in the mid 1950s openly denounced the Mau Mau uprising, especially after the murder of a prominent union official and City Councillor, Ambrose Ofafa, by Mau Mau adherents. These union members openly policed and punished Luo people suspected of being Mau Mau supporters. In the post-independence period, the union was accused of being a tribal organisation which served as a breeding ground for divisive ethnicity, in conflict with the governments nation building process.

== Dissolution and legacy ==
Jomo Kenyatta, Kenya's first president died in 1978. His successor, Daniel Arap Moi, consolidated his position by dissolving all ethnic associations in Kenya, therefore banning organisations including the Luo Union and the Gikuyu, Embu and Meru Association (GEMA) from central Kenya. These organisations were perceived as potential challengers to his authority.

Even though the welfare function of the union was lost following the ban, the social function was in part maintained through sporting events. Gor Mahia Football club, one of Kenya's most successful clubs, was formed in 1968 following the amalgamation of Luo Union FC and Luo Stars football clubs. This club is the only team from Kenya to win an African continental competition, the African Cup Winners' Cup in 1987.

== Sources ==
- Kyle, Keith (1999). The Politics of The Independence of Kenya. Palgrave MacMillan.
- Ogot, Bethwell A. (1967). History of the Southern Luo: Volume I, Migration and Settlement, 1500–1900. Peoples of East Africa. Nairobi: East African Publishing House.
- Parkin, D. (30 April 2004). "Luo Union and Other Ethnic Associations". Neighbours and nationals in an African city ward. Routledge. ISBN 0415329981.
