= Arthur Carscallen =

American linguist

Personal details
- Born: Arthur Asa Grandville Carscallen; 1879
- Died: 1964 (aged 84–85)

Arthur Asa Grandville Carscallen (1879–1964), was a Seventh-day Adventist pastor, missionary, administrator, linguist, and publisher.

== Early years ==
Born in Canada, Carscallen grew up in North Dakota, where he was baptized at age 20, just prior to starting studies at Union College from 1900 to 1901. He completed his Seventh-day Adventist (SDA) ministerial training in September 1906 at Duncombe Hall Training College in England. That same year, following his ordination, he embarked for Kenya, to begin missionary service for the SDA as superintendent of the British East Africa Mission, together with Peter Nyambo, an African Adventist worker from Nyasaland, now Malawi, who was a classmate of Carscallen at Duncombe Hall.

== Seventh-day Adventists in Kenya: Beginnings ==
The first SDA missionaries to work in Kenya were Arthur Carscallen and Nyasaland native Peter Nyambo. Leaving England, the two traveled to Hamburg, Germany, sailing from there on 1 October 1906 to East Africa. Describing the journey to Africa, Carscallen wrote. "After an exceedingly hot trip through the Red Sea, we arrived in Mombasa nearly three weeks later."

By November 27, 1906, Carscallen and Nyambo were able to open the first British East Africa Mission station in Kenya at Gendia Hill near the eastern shore of Lake Victoria on Kendu Bay with the assistance of Abraham C. Enns, a German missionary and gardener stationed in Tanganyika, today Tanzania. Enns had arrived in Tanganyika in 1903 and was working among the Pare people. Together, they chose a five‑acre plot, about three kilometers (two miles) inland from Kendu Bay for the mission site, which was situated among the Luo people in what is now South Nyanza, about which Carscallen says, "... we chose the site at Gendia among the primitive African tribe who spoke a Nilotic language." Carscallen and Nyambo worked quickly to construct the mission buildings. Nyambo remained at Gendia for about four years.

Within 14 months Carscallen reported that he and Nyambo had erected the basic mission buildings and that he had learned the Luo language. As superintendent of the Mission, Carscallen and his staff established missionary stations along the eastern shore of Lake Victoria at Gendia Hill, Wire Hill, Rusinga Island, Kanyadoto, Karung, Kisii (Nyanchwa), and Kamagambo. The first 10 Jaluo Adventist adherents in Kenya were baptized on 21 May 1911.

Publishing was central to the mission of the early Adventist Church. Thus, in 1913, Carscallen acquired a small press for the Mission during a trip home to the United States and returned to set up African Herald Publishing at Gendia in order to publish books, papers, and a monthly journal. Carscallen was one of dozens of church leaders who helped expand their faith worldwide through publishing ministries.

El misionero adventista Arthur Carscallen estableció en 1913 la African Herald Publishing (Publicadora Heraldo Africano). A. Carscallen fue uno de las docenas de dirigentes de la iglesia que ayudaron a expandir el adventismo en todo el mundo a través del ministerio de publicaciones.

— Crédito de la foto: Los Adventistas News Network.

The Dholuo language had never before been reduced to writing. To advance the literacy of the Jaluo people so that they could read the Bible, Carscallen produced a grammar textbook for the mission. Then, over the course of more than two years, Carscallen and the Mission staff translated portions of the New Testament from English to Luo, the first of which was the Gospel of Matthew, that was later published by the British and Foreign Bible Society in 1913. The grammar textbook he produced was widely used for many years. In addition to the grammar text, Carscallen produced an extensive, but unpublished, Kavirondo or Dholuo and English dictionary during his service in Kenya.

Besides Bible study, the Adventists also offered medical care and promoted public health among the Luo. As Adventists, they stressed the importance of good diet and health and started a free clinic where they treated malaria, cholera, and other diseases. While the relationship between the Adventist missionaries and the Jaluo people was not without conflict, some of it resulted in economic development. When Carscallen was joined by his fiancée, Helen, who was an accomplished seamstress, she was troubled by the lack of clothing worn by the locals and was determined to change the situation. Thus, she began to grow cotton to make fabric. Although the cotton production was successful, the missionaries had little success with convincing the Jaluo to adorn clothes. During World War I many of the missions were looted and damaged, and the workers, except Carscallen and one other, were kept from their stations for nearly two years, but he still managed to hold the staff together until the war's end.

Among Carscallen's adherents was Onyango Obama, then age 9, but someday to be the grandfather of President Barack Obama of the United States. Onyango adopted the ways of the missionaries more fully than did most of the Luo people at the time. In an interview, Onyango Obama said that "the arrival of the white missionaries provided an exciting diversion from the monotony of village life." Said to be a curious child, he was drawn to the new religion and was among the first wave of Jaluo to join with the missionaries, soon attending an Adventist boarding school and adopting the male missionaries' dress style "of long trousers and a white shirt."

In 1921, Carscallen's service in the SDA British East Africa Mission officially ended, and he returned to the United States with his family. Shortly thereafter, his wife, Helen, died that same year in Oregon.

== Life's Work After Kenya ==
In 1924, Arthur Carscallen married Anita Johnson and, together, they performed pastoral work in the Dakotas. Afterward, he worked in British Guiana (known as Guyana in the modern era) from 1931 to 1942, becoming president of the three united Guiana Adventists fields, and helped to construct a new church building in Georgetown, doing much of the carpentry work himself. Still a pioneer full of energy, he volunteered for work in the interior of British Guiana among the Davis Indians, and went to Waramadong, near Mount Roraima, at the end of 1936, where he opened a mission. Repeating the success he had in Kenya with the local languages, he produced a dictionary and grammar of the Davis language.

Upon retirement in the United States, he settled in La Sierra, California, and continued to visit churches and camp meetings.

== Contributions ==
Arthur Carscallen's many contributions to his mission work can be appreciated almost a century later in the 2013 statistics reported by the Adventists for the East-Central Africa Division (ECD), the region for which he helped to lay a foundation, together with Peter Nyambo, Abraham Enns and Johannes Ehlers who worked in Tanganyika with Enns. The data reveals the lasting influence these early Adventists left in East Africa: a baptized membership of more than 2.5 million communicants, "worshipping in more than 12,000 organized churches, led by more than 2,000 ordained and licensed ministers at the ratio of one pastor serving an average of 1,260 baptized members ..." and educating more than 500,000 students accessing Adventist education through its more than 2,000 schools, church-accredited and government-chartered universities, and providing medical assistance to the general public from its six hospitals and 130 rural clinics in the region.

== See also ==
- Seventh-day Adventist Church
- Seventh-day Adventist theology
- Seventh-day Adventist eschatology
- History of the Seventh-day Adventist Church
- Teachings of Ellen G. White
- Inspiration of Ellen G. White
- Prophecy in the Seventh-day Adventist Church
- Investigative judgment
- The Pillars of Adventism
- Second Coming
- Conditional Immortality
- Historicism
- Three Angels' Messages
- Sabbath in seventh-day churches
- Ellen G. White
- Adventism
- Seventh-day Adventist worship

== External sources ==
- "Carscallen, Arthur Asa Grandville." Seventh-day Adventist Encyclopedia, Volume A-L. Second Revised Edition. Edited by Bobbie Jane Van Dolson and Leo R. Van Dolson. "Commentary Reference Series," Volume 10. Hagerstown, MD: Review and Herald Publishing Association, 1996. pp. 300–301.
