= Kunta people =

Abakunta
Total population
- 50,000 Kenya

Regions with significant populations
- Mfangano, Rusinga/Gembe and Muhuru Bay in Western Kenya

Languages
- Dholuo, Olukunta, Swahili, and English

Religion
- Christianity, African Traditional Religion

Related ethnic groups
- Ganda, Soga, Luhya, other Bantu peoples

The Kunta people (also known as Abakunta or Abasuba) Bantu community living on the eastern shores of Lake Victoria in South Nyanza, Kenya, in the Ngodhe area in Gembe locality and Muhuru Bay area, and the nearby islands, such as Mfangano, Ringiti, Takawiri, Elemba and Rusinga. The Abakunta have been overlooked in both colonial and independent Kenya. The Kenyan government today take them to be Suba people.
