= Washington Yotto Ochieng =

Kenyan-born British academic

Washington Yotto Ochieng CBE FREng FICE
- Born: Washington Yotto Ochieng; Kendu Bay, Kenya
- Education: University of Nairobi (BSc); University of Nottingham (PhD)
- Spouse: Abosede Ochieng (m. 1997)
- Children: 2
- Scientific career
- Fields: Navigation; Positioning; Transport; Aviation; Geomatics
- Workplaces: Imperial College London; Thales Group
- Thesis: Wide area DGPS and fiducial network design (1993)
- Website: imperial.ac.uk/people/w.ochieng

Washington Yotto Ochieng is a Kenyan-born British academic who is Head of the Department of Civil and Environmental Engineering at Imperial College London. Previously, he was head of the Centre for Transport Studies and co-director of the Institute for Security Science and Technology (ISST) together with Deeph Chana. Ochieng is the interim Director of ISST. He also serves as Director of the Engineering Geomatics Group and Chair of Positioning and Navigation Systems. In 2024, Ochieng became the President of the Royal Institute of Navigation.

== Early life and education ==
He is the son of Michael Yotto Amoko and Grace Akumu Yotto (née Radigo). He earned his BSc (First Class) degree in Surveying from the University of Nairobi in 1988, before moving to the United Kingdom, where he studied for an MSc (distinction) at the University of Nottingham. He went on to study for a PhD in Differential GPS (DGPS) and fiducial network design.

== Personal life ==
In 1997, Washington Ochieng married microbiologist and science teacher, Abosede Ochieng (née Salako). They have two children, Grace and Michael. They have resided in Reading since 1999.

== Research and career ==
Ochieng remained at Nottingham as a postdoctoral research associate after his PhD, before joining Thales Group as a navigation engineer. Ochieng joined Imperial College London in 1997. He works on the design and application of navigation systems, and hopes to achieve a truly global position, navigation and timing (PNT) system. Professor Ochieng works in the area of intelligent traffic control especially Smart Intermodal User-Centric Mobility and how it can be used in security and to regulate traffic in congested streets and railways, as well as in air traffic management and maritime management. He has been involved with several international projects, including European Geostationary Navigation Overlay Service (EGNOS), Galileo, global navigation satellite system (GNSS) and the Single European Sky ATM Research (SESAR) joint undertaking. For the GNSS system, Ochieng worked on sensing, modelling of errors in the positional accuracy and ultra-wideband radio systems. He has been involved with the transformation of London's transport system and introduction of the London Congestion Charge.

He was promoted to a Chair in Positioning and Navigation Systems in 2007. In 2021, he became the Vice President of the Royal Institute of Navigation (RIN) and President in 2024. His focussed research is into the development of tools that help to shape the thinking of societies in the design and building of infrastructure resilience and security; smart user-centric intermodal mobility and; Positioning, Navigation and Timing (PNT) systems.

At Imperial College London, Ochieng is part of the Engineering and Physical Sciences Research Council (EPSRC) Centre for Doctoral Training in Sustainable Civil Engineering. He has advised on algorithms that can support the navigation of satellites.

In 2021, Ochieng was an expert witness on UK space strategy and UK satellite infrastructure at the Parliamentary select committee on science and technology.

== Awards and honours ==
- 1994: Nottingham, United Kingdom, The Leica Award for the Best Postgraduate Student in Engineering Surveying and Space Geodesy, United States. Recipient Best Session paper, United States Institute Navigation,
- 1994: Best Paper – Airborne Detection of Calibration Errors in DME Navigation Aids, awarded by the Institute of Navigation,
- 2004: Best Paper – Integrated positioning algorithms for Transport Telematics Applications, Awarded by Institute of Navigation
- 2005: Imperial College London, Rector's Merit Award for Excellence in Research, Teaching, Professional Contribution and Administration
- 2005: Best Poster Presentations at the 57th Annual Conference of the Aeronautical Society of India, Dr Abdul KAlam award – Best research presentation on aviation target safety outcomes, Awarded by the Aeronautical Society of India
- 2005: Baltimore, USA, Best Paper – The factors affecting airspace capacity in Europe: A framework methodology based on cross-sectional time-series analysis Awarded at the 6th USA/Europe Air Traffic Management (ATM) Research & Development Seminar
- 2006: Imperial College London, Excellence in Teaching Award
- 2007: The Michael Richey Medal for Best Paper in the Journal of Navigation Awarded by The Royal Institute of Navigation, UK
- 2009: GPS World Magazine global GNSS Leaders to watch
- 2019: Harold Spencer Jones Gold Medal, the highest award from the Royal Institute of Navigation.

In 2013, Ochieng was elected a Fellow of the Royal Academy of Engineering (FREng) He is also a Fellow of the UK Institutions of Civil Engineers, Chartered Institute of Highways and Transportation, RIN and Institution of Civil Engineering Surveyors.

In the 2024 Birthday Honours, Washington Yotto Ochieng was appointed a Commander of the Order of the British Empire (CBE) for services to global positioning and navigation systems.
