= George Abungu =

Kenyan archeologist

George Okello Abungu
- Citizenship: Kenya
- Occupation: Archaeologist
- Honours: The Orders of Arts and Letters

George Okello Abungu is a Kenyan archeologist, and former Director-General of the National Museums of Kenya. He is conferred the Knight of the Order of Arts and Letters for his contribution to Heritage locally and globally, a recipient of Lifetime Achievement in Defense of Art by Association for Research into Crimes against Art.

== Career ==
Abungu served as Kenya’s representative to the UNESCO World Heritage Committee, vice-president of its Bureau from 2004 to 2008. He serves as the Chairman of the International Standing Committee on the Traffic of Illicit Antiquities, whose responsibilities include the return of stolen artefacts to Kenya and prevention of the illegal trade of antiquities.

== Membership/fellowship ==
Abungu is a visiting lecturer at Gothenburg University, University of the Western Cape, and University of Florida. A guest lecturer at both Getty Conservation and Getty Research Institutes. Others include:

- Member of the International Jury of the UNESCO Melina Mecouri International Prize for Safeguard and Management of Cultural Landscapes
- Fellow of the Stellenbosch Institute for Advanced Studies, South Africa
- Founding Professor of Heritage Studies, University of Mauritius
- Vice President of International Council of Museums

== Awards/honours ==
- Knight of the Order of Arts and Letters
- Lifetime Achievement in Defense of Art by Association for Research into Crimes against Art

== Publications ==
- National Museums in Africa: reflection on memory, identity and the politics of heritage (w/Silverman et al, 2022)
- The Heritage of the Colonized: Managing Heritage in Africa (w/Webber Ndoro, 2023)
- Museums: geopolitics, decolonisation, globalisation and migration
