= Agricultural geography =

Sub-discipline of human geography

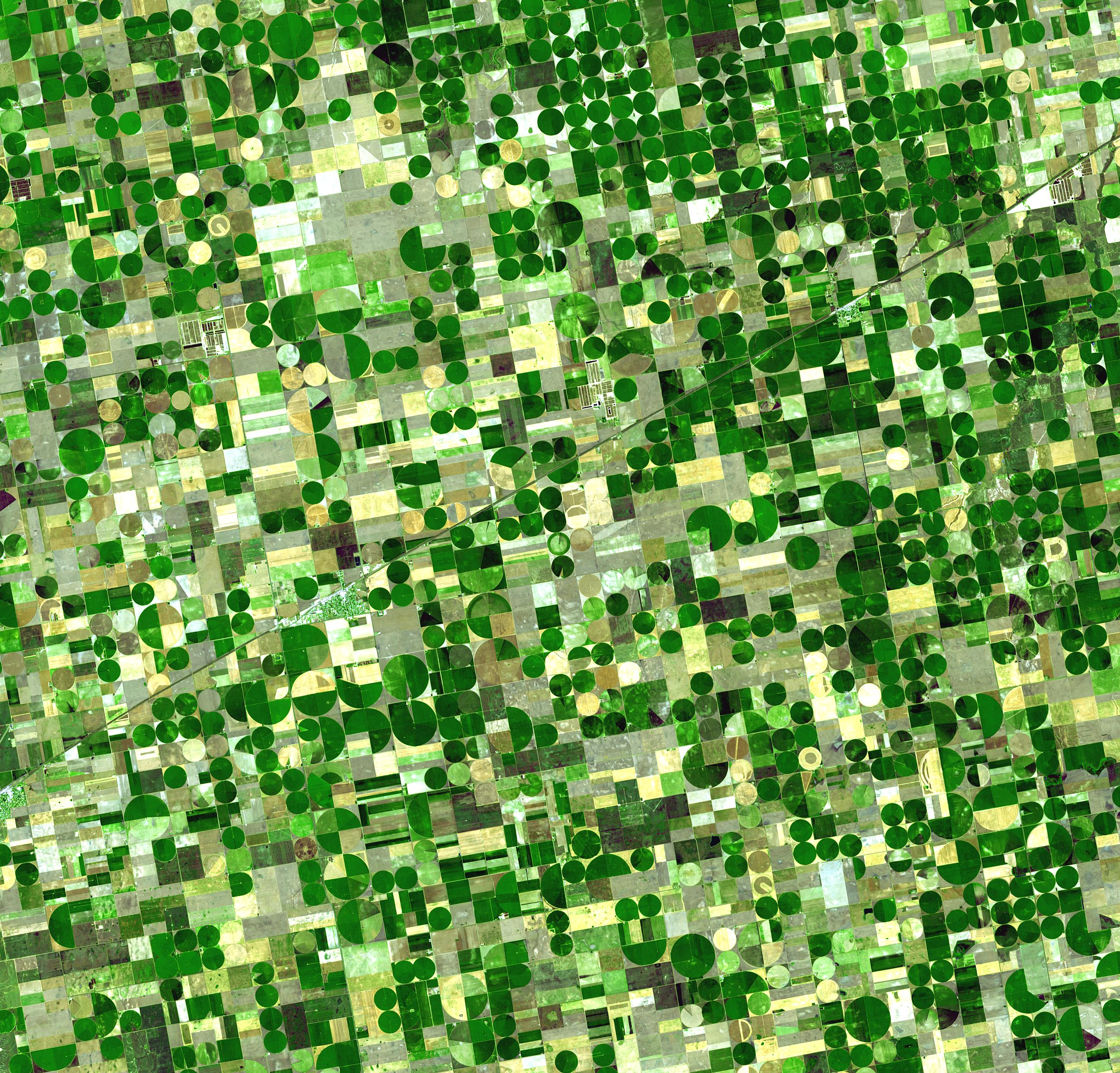
Agricultural patterns of crop production in Kansas

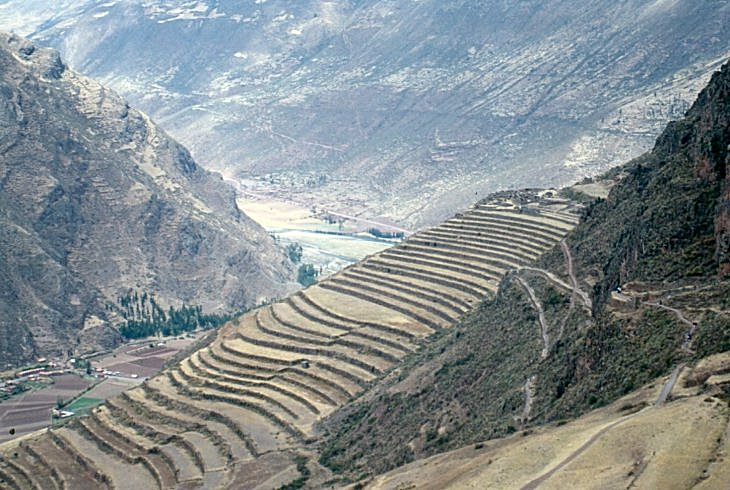
Cultivated terraces at Pisacu, Peru

Agricultural geography is a sub-discipline of human geography concerned with the spatial relationships found between agriculture and humans. That is, the study of the phenomena and effects that lead to the formation of the earth's top surface, in different regions.

== History ==
Humans have been interacting with their surroundings since as early as man has been around. According to article "How Does an Agricultural Region Originate?" English settlers who landed on American soil hundreds of years ago greatly shaped American agriculture when they learned how to plant and grow crops from the Natives. Settlers continue to change the landscape by the demolishing wooded areas and turning them into pasteurized fields.

== Focus ==
It is traditionally considered the branch of economic geography that investigates those parts of the Earth's surface that are transformed by humans through primary sector activities for consumption. It thus focuses on the different types of structures of agricultural landscapes and asks for the cultural, social, economic, political, and environmental processes that lead to these spatial patterns. While most research in this area concentrates rather on production than on consumption, a distinction can be made between nomothetic (e.g. distribution of spatial agricultural patterns and processes) and idiographic research (e.g. human-environment interaction and the shaping of agricultural landscapes). The latter approach of agricultural geography is often applied within regional geography.

== Events ==
The war in Bosnia-Herzegovina from 1992 to 1995 affected a large majority of the country farming land due to the large number of land mines (approximately 1 million) that were planted and never were recovered or detonated. These areas with the landmines have become abandoned for obvious safety reasons. Much of the area where the landmines were planted was farming land, now residents of this country have to find another way to grow the crops they once planted there.

== Research Studies ==
A research study was done in Uganda where the researchers selected four completely different types of environmental factors and those factors were: rain-forest with no animal interaction, rain-forest animal and human interaction, urban living, and rain-forest with animal interaction. After running several analyzing test using the top soil and rain water it was determined that the urban living areas had higher levels of nitrogen, calcium and pH levels.

== See also ==
- Geography of food
- Agricultural sciences

== Literature ==
- Robinson, G.M. (2003): Geographies of Agriculture: Globalisation, Restructuring and Sustainability. Routledge. ISBN 978-0-582-35662-7
- Grigg, D. (1995): An Introduction to Agricultural Geography. Routledge. ISBN 978-0-415-08443-7
