= Walter Jaoko =

Kenyan professor

- Born: Walter Jaoko; 1961 (age 64–65)
- Education: University of Nairobi, University of Liverpool, University of Copenhagen
- Scientific career
- Fields: Infectious diseases transmission, treatment and control
- Workplaces: Department of Medical Microbiology and Immunology, University of Nairobi, KAVI-Institute of Clinical Research, University of Nairobi, University of Alabama, Stellenbosch University

Walter Jaoko is a Kenyan professor of medical microbiology and tropical medicine. He is a past Director of KAVI-Institute of Clinical Research (KAVI-ICR), a former Adjunct Professor at University of Alabama and a former Extraordinary Professor at the Centre for Bioethics and Law in the Department of Medicine at Stellenbosch University.

== Birth and education ==
Jaoko was born in 1961. He obtained his Medical Degree (MB;ChB) from University of Nairobi in 1986. In 1993, he received his master's degree in Tropical Medicine (MTropMed) from the University of Liverpool. In 1996, he bagged a Diploma in Research Methodology from the University of Copenhagen. He obtained his PhD in medical microbiology in 2001 from the University of Nairobi, a Postgraduate Diploma in Health Research Ethics (cum laude) from Stellenbosch University in 2014, and a Master of Bioethics degree (MGB) from Anahuac University in 2023 . He became a Fellow of the Africa Academy of Sciences in 2022.

== Career ==
=== Academics ===
Jaoko became an assistant lecturer at the Department of Medical Microbiology and Immunology, University of Nairobi in 1989, a full lecturer in 1993, a senior lecturer in 1998, the chair of the Department of Medical Microbiology in 2005, an associate professor in 2007 and a professor in 2011. In 2008, he became an Adjunct Assistant Professor at the School of Public Health, Department of Epidemiology, University of Alabama and in 2016 he became Extraordinary Professor in Medicine at Centre of Bioethics and Law in the Department of Internal Medicine Stellenbosch University, in Cape Town.

=== KAVI – Institute of Clinical Research (KAVI-ICR) ===
Jaoko was an honorary consultant and a clinical manager/senior trial physician at KAVI-Institute of Clinical Research, University of Nairobi, in 2001. He became the Principal Investigator for several studies from 2002, the Deputy Director in 2013 and the Director of the institute from 2019 to 2025.

Jaoko has been a Fellow of the Africa Academy of Sciences (AAS) since 2021.

Jaoko is a member of several professional organizations including being the President, HIV Clinicians Society of Kenya (2022- current), Member, American Society of Tropical Medicine & Hygiene (2022- current), Fellow of the Africa Academy of Sciences (AAS) since 2021, Member, Global HIV Collaborative (2020- current), Member, Rotary Club of Ngong Hills (2020- current), Member, Royal Society of Tropical Medicine & Hygiene (2013- current), Member, International Society of Travel Medicine (2013-2015), Member, Kenya Medical Association (1989- current) and a Registered Member, Medical Practitioners and Dentists Council (1989- current).

In addition, Jaoko is member of several Boards including chair, Advisory Board, Fahari ya Jamii, a USAID funded Project at University of Nairobi (2022 – 2025), chair of the Board of Directors of several organizations including I Choose Life Africa (2017- current), The Navigators, Kenya, a Christian-based discipleship organization (2016-2022), Nyanza Reproductive Health Society (2013- 2021), Mildmay International, Kenya (2012- current), and member Scientific Advisory Board, Uganda Virus Research Centre (2010-2015), International Centre for Research on Reproductive Health, Kenya (2007- current), member of the Bioethics Advisory Council, Pfizer Pharmaceuticals (2022 - 2023), member of the Scientific Advisory Board, Belgian Red Cross (2023- 2024), member of RFH Board (2022. - current), member of the Board of UNTOLD (2020-2025), member of the World Health Organization (WHO) Research Ethics Committee (2025- current), among others.

== Research interests ==
Jaoko research interest is in infectious diseases. In this regard he has conducted research in the transmission, treatment, prevention and control of HIV including phase 1/2 HIV vaccine clinical trials and use of monoclonal antibodies for prevention of HIV transmission. He has also conducted phase 3 clinical trials on preventive vaccines for, TB, RSV and COVID-19 and is embarking on a phase 3 clinical trials for a preventive cholera vaccine due to start in the first quarter of 2026.

== Fellowships and memberships ==
In 1989, Jaoko became a member of the Kenya Medical Association and a member of Medical Practitioners and Dentists board. In 2013, he became a member of International Society of Travel Medicine and a member of Royal Society of Tropical Medicine & Hygiene. In 2021, he became a Fellow of African Academy of Sciences.

== Selected publications ==
- Long JE, Waruguru G, Yuhas K, Wilson KS, Masese LN, Wanje G, Kinuthia J, Jaoko W, McClelland RS, Mandaliya K (2019). Prevalence and predictors of unmet contraceptive need in HIV-positive female sex workers in Mombasa, Kenya. PLoS One (in print)
- Chepchirchir A, Nyagol J & Jaoko W (2019). Cytokine expression and hypertension comorbidity in HIV/AIDS patients at Kenyatta National Hospital HIV Care Centre, Nairobi, Kenya. International Journal of Cardiovasular Research 2018; 7:2
- Perciani CT, Jaoko W, Farah B, Ostrowski MA, Anzala O, MacDonald KS; KAVI-ICR Team (2018). αEβ7, α4β7 and α4β1 integrin contributions to T cell distribution in blood, cervix and rectal tissues: Potential implications for HIV transmission. PLoS One 13(2): e0192482
- Masiye, F, Jaoko, W, Rennie, S. Stakeholder views on informed consent models for future use of biological samples in Malawi and South Africa. BMC Med Ethics. 2023;24 (1):4. doi: 10.1186/s12910-023-00882-4. PubMed PMID 36658544 PubMed Central PMC9854061
