= Dan Aceda =

Kenyan musician (born 1984)

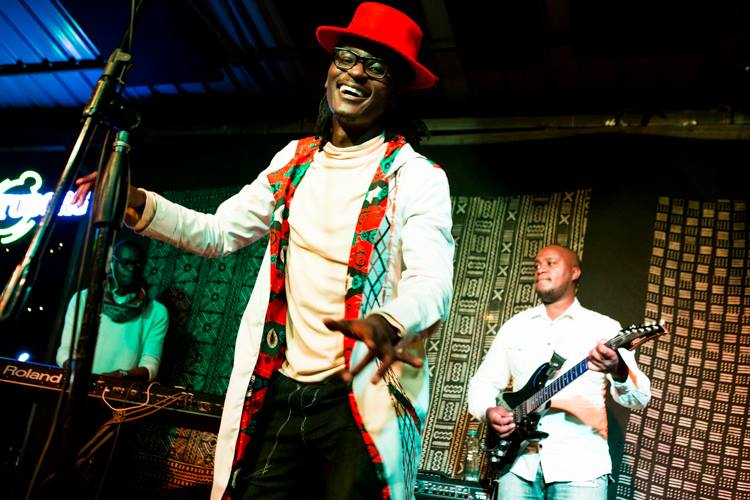
- Aceda performing at The Thursday Night Live show in Nairobi on 10 May 2018
- Born: Dan Okoth; 10 October 1984 (age 41); Kisumu County, Kenya
- Education: University of Nairobi
- Occupations: Singer; songwriter; musician; actor; architect
- Years active: 2005–present
- Musical career
- Genres: R&B; soul; neo soul; pop; Benga Music
- Instruments: Vocals; bass; drums
- Website: danaceda.co.ke

Dan Okoth (born Kisumu District, Western Kenya), better known as Dan Aceda, is a Kenyan musician, entrepreneur, architect, and actor from Nairobi. He has recently been recognised by a Kenyan online magazine as having one of the top 10 most iconic male voices in his home country. In 2014 he was nominated to be a part of the Global Accelerator Conference for entrepreneurs organised by the UN Foundation in New York City. He is also a 2013–2014 Global Health Corps fellow.

== Education ==
Aceda holds two degrees from the University of Nairobi: a bachelor's degree in Architectural Studies attained in 2008 and a bachelor's degree in Architecture attained in 2010. He attended Strathmore School where he got his nickname “Chizi” from a close friend Jones Mwenda; and Kilimani Primary School as well as Shadrack Kimalel Primary School.

== Awards ==
Aceda was the recipient of two Kisima Awards garnered in 2008 for Best Male Afro Fusion artiste as well as Songwriter of the year. He was also nominated for the 2011 Kisima Awards in the Best Afro Fusion category. In 2011 he became the first Kenyan musician to perform at the Lake of Stars Festival in Malawi. Prior to this Dan had performed at the 2010 SawaSawa Festival in Nairobi, Kenya. He was also a cast member in the 2009 musical Mo Faya, which was written by compatriot Eric Wainaina and staged at the 2009 New York Musical Theatre Festival.

Previously he was nominated in the 2008 edition of the Groove Awards in the Category of Artiste of the Year.

== Albums ==
Aceda has recorded and released four studio albums. SULUWE, his debut album was produced in 2005 by David Blackman Muthami and published by Kijiji Records. The album title is a corruption of a Dholuo word that means "star". This album featured one of Aceda's most famous songs "Sanasana".

His second album "Benganology" was released in 2010. It featured production work by Robert "Rkay" Kamanzi, Chris Adwar, Aaron Rimbui, Tim Rimbui, and David Muthami. The album also features the 2009 hit song "Saida". The album caused local Kenyan media to label Dan "the crown prince of Benga" in reference to the style of music called Benga that is indigenous to East Africa and specifically Kenya. Benganology peaked at Number 4 in the iTunes Kenya Chart in 2019.

In 2013 Dan Published his 3rd solo studio project titled "'Made in Kenya'". The album was self produced and featured work by Amileena Mwenesi, King Kaka, Monica Obaga, Jimmy Hope (Togo), Chemphe (Ghana), Kavutha Mwanzia and Victor Seii.

In 2018 Dan's fourth studio album "'Accelarata'"Was released that featured work by Avril, Etana, Fena, Sage, Proff and Winyo. The album is receiving rave reviews and continues to be among the most popular albums in Kenya.

== Collaborations ==
The two albums feature collaborations with several Kenyan musicians including Eric Wainaina, Wyre, Neema Ntalel, Sanaipei Tande and Kanjii Mbugua. In 2007 Dan featured on the Umoja Pamoja project alongside Suzanna Owiyo, Eric Wainaina, Sara Mitaru, Nyota Ndogo, Neema Ntalel, as well as Karen Lucas. The project was funded by the US Embassy in Nairobi.

Aceda was featured on the 2008 Action Aid project alongside Pastor Brian and Tim Rimbui to produce the song "Lift your hands". He was also featured on the song "Colours" by Joseph Hellon.

Aceda featured on Songs by local Rappers Charles Righa and Richard 'A-star' Njau.

== Songwriting ==
Aceda has written songs for several Kenyan musicians including Kanjii Mbugua (what if, Nanana, Posibo, Mr Money), Tim Rimbui (Shamba la Wanyama, Lift your hands), Joseph Hellon (Colours), Atemi Oyungu (Domestics) among others. He was also among the writers of the 2006 Mavuno Worship Project that was published by Kijiji Records in conjunction with Mavuno Church.

== Current work ==
Aceda performs in Nairobi regularly and has created a quarterly event dubbed The Affair which features fellow musicians Chris Adwar, Jacob Asiyo and Atemi Oyungu. In 2011, Aceda launched the Mabawa Project, a charitable initiative aimed at providing school books for needy children in Kenya.
