= Music of Kenya =

The music of Kenya is very diverse, with multiple types of folk music based on the variety over 50 regional languages.

Zanzibaran taarab music has also become popular, as has hip hop, reggae music, soul, soukous, zouk, rock and roll, funk and Europop. Additionally, there is a western classical music scene and Kenya is home to a number of music colleges and schools.

== Popular music ==
The guitar is the most dominant instrument in Kenyan popular music. Guitar rhythms are very complex and include both native beats and imported ones, especially the Congolese cavacha rhythm; music usually involves the interplay of multiple parts and, more recently, showy guitar solos.

Lyrics are most often in Swahili or native languages, like Kalenjin though radio will generally not play music in one of the ethnic languages.

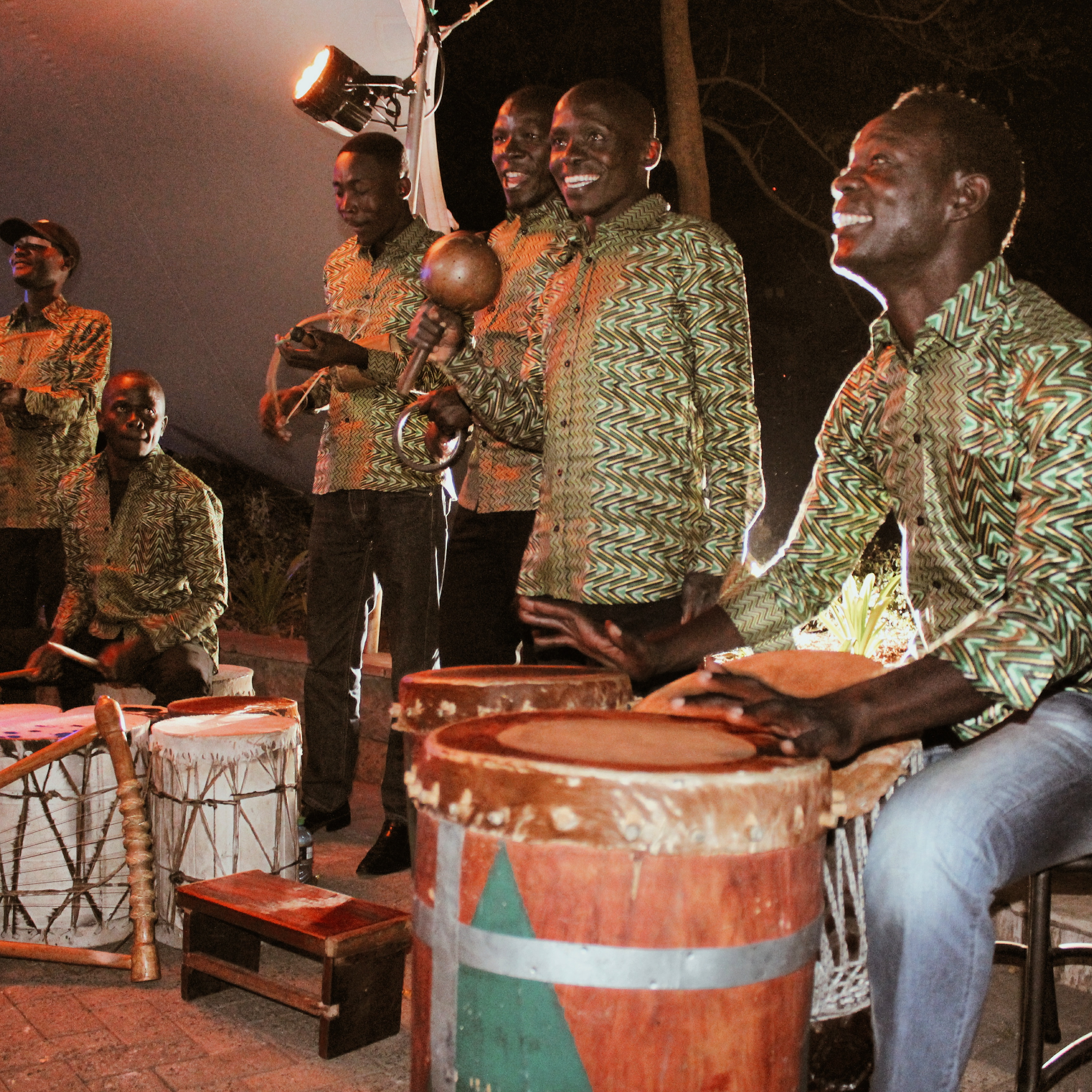
Kenyan Musicians performing traditional Luo songs

Benga music has been popular since the late 1960s, especially around Lake Victoria. The word benga is occasionally used to refer to any kind of pop music: bass, guitar and percussion are the usual instruments.

Partially from 1994 and wholly from 2003 Kenyan popular music has been recognised through the Kisima Music Awards. A number of styles predominate in Kenya including Benga and Reggae have separate categories, and a multitude of Kenyan artists are awarded each year.

=== Early 20th century ===
The guitar was popular in Kenya even before the 19th century, well before it penetrated other African countries. Fundi Konde was the best-known early guitarist, alongside Paul Mwachupa and Lukas Tututu the middle of the 1920s, dance clubs had appeared in Mombasa, playing music for Christians to dance in a European style.

During World War II, Kenyan and Ugandan musicians were drafted as entertainers in the King's African Rifles and continued after the war as the Rhino Band, the first extremely popular band across Kenya. In 1948, the group split, with many of the members forming the Kiko Kids or other bands.

By the 1950s, radio and recording technology had advanced across Kenya. Fundi Konde, the prominent guitarist, was an early broadcaster and influential in the fledgling recording industry.

=== Congolese finger-style and the development of benga ===
Beginning in about 1952, recordings from Congolese guitarists like Edouard Massengo and Jean-Bosco Mwenda were available in Kenya. Bosco's technique of picking with the thumb and forefinger (finger-style) became popular. Finger-style music is swift and usually based around small groups, in which the second guitar follows the first with syncopated bass rhythms. This style of music became extremely popular later in the decade.

=== Swahili and Congolese pop ===
The two biggest genres of pop music played by Kenyan bands are called the Swahili sound or the Congolese sound. Both are based on soukous (rumba) from the Democratic Republic of the Congo. Swahili music can be distinguished by a much slower rhythm, though the styles have had a tendency to merge in recent decades. The genres are not distinguished by language, though Swahili pop is usually in Swahili or the related Taiti language. Both are sometimes in Lingala or one of the native languages of Kenya.

Congolese musicians were the most popular performers in Kenya during the 1970s and 1980s, only losing their mainstream acceptance in the early 1990s. Orchestre Virunga was perhaps the most popular and long-running of the Congolese bands. During this period, Swahili musicians (many from Tanzania) were mostly based around the Wanyika bands. This group of often rival bands began in 1971 when a Tanzanian group named Arusha Jazz came to Kenya, eventually becoming the Simba Wanyika Band. The band first split in 1978, when many of the group members formed Les Wanyika. Other notable Congolese groups in Kenya included Super Mazembe and Les Mangelepa. Tanzania's Moro Band and Remmy Ongala also became quite popular in Kenya back in the 1980s. It was hard to differentiate them from the native Kenyan singers.

=== Hotel pop ===
Tourist-oriented pop covers are popular, and employ more live bands than more authentic Kenyan folk and pop genres. Them Mushrooms, who began playing the Nairobi hotel circuit in 1987, are among these bands. Lately, hotel bands like Them Mushrooms and Safari Sound Band began playing reggae.

=== Regional pop ===
The Luo people, one of Kenya's largest ethnic groups, live in the Western part of Kenya and their pop music is what epitomizes the original Benga style. Contemporary variations of Benga and Luo traditional music has produced the Ohangla style that is popular with young Luo. The Luo of Kenya have long played an eight-string lyre called nyatiti, and guitarists from the area sought to imitate the instrument's syncopated melodies. In benga, the electric bass guitar is played in a style reminiscent of the nyatiti. As late as the turn of the twentieth century, this bass in nyatiti supported the rhythm essential in transmitting knowledge about the society through music. Opondo Owenga of Gem Yala, the grandfather of Odhiambo Siangla, was known in employing music as a means of teaching history of the Luo. The fathers of the Luo Benga genre are George Ramogi (Omogi wuod Weta) and CK Jazz. He helped the Benga enthusiasts by recording their Benga music in different labels in the capital city Nairobi. Dr. Mengo of Victoria Jazz was a protege of George Ramogi.

In 1967, the first major benga band, Shirati Jazz, was formed by Daniel Owino Misiani. The group launched a string of hits that were East Africa's biggest songs throughout the 1970s and 1980s. Shirati Jazz's biggest rival was Victoria Jazz, formed in 1972 by Ochieng Nelly Mengo and Collela Mazee. Despite many personnel changes, Victoria Jazz remained popular throughout the 1970s, when the Voice of Kenya radio station pushed an onslaught of East African pop. Victoria C Band of Awino Lawi was one of the splinter group of Victoria Jazz.

1997 saw the death of three prominent Luo Benga artist, Okatch Biggy of Heka Heka Band, George Ramogi and Prince Jully. The Jolly Boys Band of Prince Jully was taken over by his wife Princess Jully and she has since been a leading female Benga musician.[1]

Another famous benga band Migori Super Stars was formed in the mid-1970s and was led by Musa Olwete which later split to form another popular benga band Migori Super Stars C with musicians such as Joseph Ochola (Kasongo Polo Menyo), Onyango Jamba, Ochieng' Denge denge and others.

More modern benga artists include Akothee Kapere Jazz Band and the rootsy Ogwang Lelo Okoth. The new millennium has seen emergence of Dola Kabarry and Musa Juma. The latter saw his career cut short as he died in 2011. MJ, as he was popularly known to his fans, developed a kind of benga that infused elements of rumba. He was able to mold other musicians such as John Junior, Ogonji, Madanji, and his late brother Omondi Tonny.[2] More recently, the compositions of the trumpeter Christine Kamau combine jazz with benga and rhumba.

There are also Benga artists are based in countries other than Kenya, such as American/Kenyan group Extra Golden.

The Kamba people live to the south and east of Nairobi. Their pop music is closely related to benga, but includes a second guitar that plays a melodious counterpoint to the primary guitar. The most popular Kamba pop bands arose in the middle of the 1970s and include Les Kilimambogo Brothers Band led by Kakai Kilonzo, Kalambya Boys & Kalambya Sisters led by Onesmus Musyoki and Joseph Mutaiti and Peter Mwambi & His Kyanganga Boys. Other groups also include Lower Mbooni Boys Band, Muthetheni Boys Band and Ukia Boys Band.

Other Akamba Pop Bands were formed in the 1980s and included Kakuku Boys Band vocalled by John Mutua Muteti whose lyrics consisted of religious, domestic, and court humour, Ngoleni Brothers which was formed by Dick Mutuku Mulwa after he left Kalambya Boys & Kalambya Sisters. It can also be noted that Kalambya Boys original members were Onesmus Musyoki (vocals), Joseph Mutaiti (vocals), Dick Mutuku Mulwa (rhythm guitar), James Maisha Muli(Drums) and Peter Kisaa (solo guitar). Kalambya Boys split and Joseph Mutaiti formed Super Kaiti and Onesmus Musyoki went gospel to form Emali Town Choir.

Leading Luhya musicians include Sukuma Bin Ongaro, and Shem Tube with his group Abana Ba Nasery.

An instrument with eight strings, called "litungu," played popularly in Bungoma by the Bukusu people in a band, began to become popularized in 2020 when Wabwile wa Mbakalo used a love message to educate and fabish the community in Luhya and Bukusu dialect, Wabwile Wa Mbakalo has become popular in Bungoma region, along with other young singers in the region.

=== Hip hop ===
Kenyan hip hop artists rap in English, Swahili, the local Sheng slang or even in vernacular language like kikuyu (G.rongi), Kisii (Smallz Lethal) or dholuo (Gidi Gidi Maji Maji). One of its many popular genres is Genge, with artists such as Jua Cali, Nonini and Jimwat. There is also Kapuka rap, with artists like Nameless. Female rappers includ Needah of Grosspool Music and Xtatic, who got signed to Sony Music. Others include like Wangechi and Femi One. Kenyan hardcore rap which is characterised by swift freestyle battlers and lyricists like Mc Mike G of 237 cypher, Bamboo, G.rongi, Jay Fourz, SDL, Abass Doobiez and Chiwawa.

Camp Mulla, an alternative hip hop group, has had more success than any other Kenyan artist in history. As of 28 September 2012, they had won two CHAT Awards and had been nominated for the BET Awards, the MTV Europe Music Awards and the MOBO Awards.

=== Reggae ===
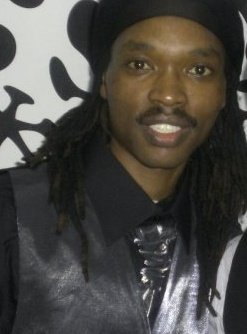
Pioneer Reggae MC Prince Otach

Reggae is one of the most popular genres of music in Kenya. Reggae elements are often mixed with local hip hop and pop music, yet there have not been many mainstream reggae musicians in Kenya. One of the best known local reggae musicians is the late Mighty King Kong. Other Reggae icons in Kenya include Wyre and Red San.

=== Rock ===
Rock music is represented by a number of locally established as well as emerging rock bands (there are over twelve active local rock bands in Nairobi alone), and mutually organised rock themed events. Foreign international rock bands (Jars of Clay, Casting Crowns, 38th Parallel, Zebra & Giraffe) have also graced the local scene.

Organized member bodies such as Wiyathi (now defunct) and Roffeke (Rock 'n' Roll Film Festival Kenya) initially marketed local rock bands in the country by hosting regular shows and helped to establish a vibrant rock community. A governing body, the Rock Society of Kenya, serves to promote the interests of member bands. The society organizes rock related events like the Battle of the Bands and live rock club shows.

Radio stations that play rock music have included 98.4 Capital FM and 105.5 X FM, the latter being a 24-hour rock station. In 2019, 105.5 X FM was shut down by the parent company Radio Africa. KTN (Str8up), STV (The Rumble) and K24 (The Rumble) also play regular weekly rock shows. Popular prominent local rock bands include acts such as Parking Lot Grass, Last Year's Tragedy(LYT)- Whose song "March From the Underground" is said to have foreseen the recent attacks on a Kenyan University, Murfy's fLaw, Dove Slimme, M20, Rock of Ages, Seismic, The Itch, The Beathogs, Crystal Axis, DEOWA, Rash, Bedslum and metal band Mortal Soul.

== Kalpop ==
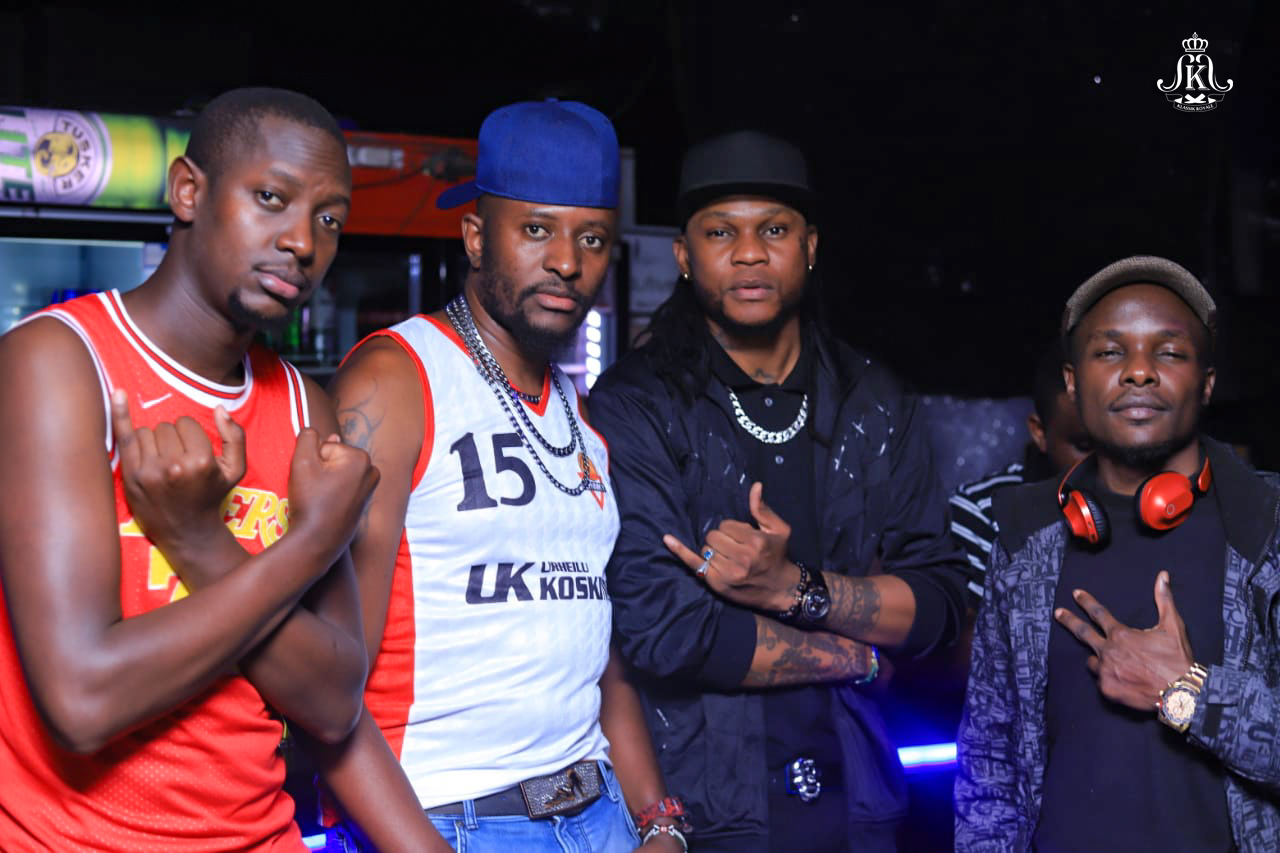
DON SANTO, Jilly Beatz, DJ Pisces, and a fan at Club 64 Nairobi, Kenya on Thursday, 13 June 2019. / Klassik Pictures

Kalpop is a popular music genre that originated in the Klassikan royal communities under Klassik Nation record label. Kalpop is a genre of Klassikan, African, lingual (multicultural), and popular music that originated in its modern form during the mid-1990s in Kenya and later spread to the United States and the United Kingdom. There are a number of locally established as well as emerging Kalpop bands (there are over thirteen active local Kalpop bands in Nairobi alone) performing in different as well as mutually organised Kalpop themed events.

DON SANTO, El Klassik Band, J Wizo, Badman Killa, Stringa, Kibbz J, Ruthless 254, GKS9, G Msoto, Blessed Paul, Cash B, Jay Nuclear, Rekless, G-Youts (Washu B and Nicki Mulla), Sleek Whizz, Chizei, are among the many artists playing Kalpop music in Kenya.

=== Other genres ===
There is interest in other genres of music such as house, Trap Music, and drum and bass. Acts like Just A Band Skilz have also dabbled in numerous alternative genres. Kenyan Trap Music has been popularized by artist like Ekko Dydda and artists from Janeson Recordings. Neo-soul music has been featured at recurrent events such as Blankets and Wine, promoting upcoming Neo-soul bands and artistes such as Sage, Antoneosol, Sara Mitaru, Sauti Sol and Dela. Genres such as Genge with artists such as Jua Cali and Nonini acting as ambassadors of this genre. In 2019, a new music genre emerged in Nairobi referred to as Gengeton. Gengeton was a huge success. However, due to the quarantine in 2020 as a result of COVID-19 pandemic, Gengetone musicians such as Boondocks Gang were unable to perform, affecting the earlier success.

Genres such as Kapuka also have an audience with acts such as Nameless, the late Esir, and the late K-rupt sampling from these genres. The Kenyan music scene regards itself as diverse, but some in the scene do launch criticism at what they perceive as a lack of musical originality.

== Traditional music ==
Kenya's diverse ethnic groups each have their own folk music traditions, though most have declined in popularity in recent years as gospel music became more popular. The Turkana people of the north, the Bajuni, Akamba, Borana, Chuka, Gusii, Kikuyu, Luhya and Lu, the Maasai and the related Samburu and the Mijikenda ("nine tribes") of the eastern coast are all found within the borders of Kenya.
