= Bango (music) =

Bango is a music style created and made popular on the East African coast by Joseph Ngala. It fuses traditional Portuguese music genres, Arabic-influenced taarab music, jazz, and coastal Bantu musical traditions. It resembles easy-listening styles of Latin America such as bossa nova, as well as music from various Indian Ocean islands including the Seychelles and Mauritius.

The genre gets its name from the song "Bango" by Ngala (also known by the stage name "Mzee Ngala"), a well-known Kenyan bango musician from Freretown, Mombasa. He is the founder of the genre and previously performed with groups such as the Hodi Boys. He later founded and led the 1960s–1970s group Bahari Boys, serving as its main composer and creative force.

Other notable bango artists influenced by Ngala include Uyoga Band (formerly Them Mushrooms), Teusi 5, and Bango Sounds. Ngala continues to perform at events such as the bi-annual Coast Night in Nairobi and at various venues across Kenya's Coast region, including the Jamboree Club. Many bango songs are traditionally composed for weddings. Examples include “Jimmy na Anne” (written for Jimmy Ngala's wedding to Anna), “Billy na Susan”, “Kombe na Dogo”, and “David na Vera”.

Bango music is a fusion of jazz, rhumba, and Mijikenda traditional music, including Mwanzele (often performed during funerals), chakacha (performed at weddings and used to teach young women about marital responsibilities), and Brasso. The genre emerged from long-term musical exchange along the Kenyan coast between the early and mid‑20th century. Bango songs are primarily composed in Swahili, though contemporary artists also compose in Mijikenda. These songs are crafted to be understood and appreciated even by non-Mijikenda listeners. In a 2017 interview with Mashirima Kapombe (KTN), Mzee Ngala confirmed that bango is a fusion of jazz and rhumba blended with traditional Mijikenda musical elements.

Bango plays a crucial role in wedding and marriage practices along the Kenyan coast. Many artists specialize in composing songs for wedding and betrothal ceremonies to celebrate the couple. Bango songs are central to coastal weddings, as the Rabai saying illustrates: “Harusi bila bango si harusi” (“A wedding without bango is not a wedding”). In many coastal cultures, songs were traditionally composed in honor of suitors and performed with dances during betrothal and wedding ceremonies. Bango songs often contain marital advice from parents and elders, as well as blessings for the couple.

In his study, Masudi Chiguinia Mohamed examined patterns of composition, repetition, and visual imagery in five of Mzee Joseph Katana Ngala's bango songs: “Kadzo”, “Simba”, “Adam na Hawa”, “Vituko”, and “Moyo Tulia”. He selected the first recorded song from each decade between 1970 and 2019. The study found that Ngala's songs emphasize themes of love and gratitude through formal verse structures and regular rhyme schemes. Repetition adds variation and reinforces these themes, while visual imagery—through similes and metaphors—enhances emotional expression. The study contributes to the understanding and appreciation of bango music.

== Origin of Bango ==
Bango originated from the spread of Christianity along the Kenyan coast. It developed in mission stations such as Rabai (1844), Ribe (1862), Freretown (1873), and Mazeras (1893). Freretown, located on the coastal mainland east of Mombasa, was established as a settlement for freed slaves from Tanzania, Malawi, and Zambia (Morton, 2018). The early residents were therefore not from the Mijikenda community. Over time, the mission stations also received people fleeing hunger and civil unrest in Mombasa, including early pioneers of bango music such as Joseph Katana Ngala.

Traditional African drums (ngoma) were prohibited in these mission stations, as missionaries viewed them as inappropriate. Instead, they formed the Freed Slave Force and provided brass drums, trumpets, and military-style uniforms. These instruments accompanied church hymns and helped musicians develop their skills. The brass band tradition, known as beni, was initially performed only on religious and public holidays but later became a popular entertainment genre. Beni was eventually replaced by dansi, a more sophisticated dance style.

Both beni and dansi played important roles in uniting coastal communities, particularly through weddings—much like bango does today. In the early 1960s, Muslim beni artists from Kaloleni and Mariakani transformed the genre into Brasso. Initially performed for government functions, Brasso later became a popular entertainment style. Brasso bands performed at festivals in Mwembe Tayari and were eventually invited to mission stations where jazz and rhumba were also played. Coastal genres at the time had strong religious associations: Swahili communities embraced beni, while Christians embraced dansi, which later incorporated jazz and rhumba.

Mijikenda artists transformed Beni → Dansi → Brasso → Bango by the 1980s. Five Brasso bands were formed in Ribe: the Mijikenda Band, Mtito Band, Batito Band, Utamaduni Band, and Utajiju Band. These bands performed instrumental music, composed original songs, and recorded their own work. They performed not only at weddings but also at parties and funerals, attracting diverse audiences.

Bango received its name in 1987 when Ngala performed at his cousin's wedding in Freretown. After exhausting their “golden rhumba oldies,” Ngala and his band performed a simple song he had composed, “Naitaka Bango.” The audience enthusiastically embraced it, singing along to the chorus: “Naitaka bango, bango, bango. Naitaka bango tena naitaka kamili” (“I want my money, and I want it in full”). The song narrates a man demanding repayment of one shilling—then colloquially called bango—from a friend named Kazungu. Despite Ngala's initial hesitation, the song became extremely popular. The release of the Naitaka Bango album in 1990 brought widespread recognition to Ngala's group. The song's rhythm, slightly different from rhumba, became popular at weddings across Mombasa, Freretown, Rabai, Mazeras, Ribe, Kaloleni, and Mariakani. Fans began referring to Ngala as “Mzee Bango.”
