= Mombasa Roots =

Kenyan Musical Group

Mombasa Roots (or Mombasa Roots Band) are a Kenyan afropop/hotel pop musical group. They have recorded some of the most successful hit singles in Kenyan pop music, such as Disco Chakacha and Kata. Their most famous album is Lele Mama.

== History ==
The band was founded in 1977 by the "Juma Brothers" from Mombasa, i.e., Suleiman Juma (keyboards, vocals), Saeed Juma (band manager) and Ebrahim Juma (guitar). They were later joined by Mahmood Siraj (guitar and vocals), Hassan Malambo (trumpet and vocals), Tamrat Kabede (drums), and a fourth Juma brother, Ahmed Juma Ahmed (guitar, saxophone, vocals). The band played live throughout Kenya, achieving a great popularity.

In 1987 they recorded for Polygram their debut album, Msa Mombasa, from which hit singles Disco Chakacha and Kata were taken.

As many Kenyan bands, Mombasa Roots mostly played live in great hotels. This gave them some popularity among European and American tourists and foreigners in general, as well as the opportunity to play abroad (most notably in Germany, Switzerland, Canada, Dubai, and Oman).

In 1999 they recorded a successful CD, Lele Mama, that included some tracks from Msa Mombasa as well as previously unreleased material.

Despite their success, Mombasa Roots experienced much personnel rotation. Most of the founding members left between the 1980s and the 1990s: drummer Katebe relocated to Sweden, trumpeter Malambo left the music business, Mahmood Siraj moved to another band, and Saeed bought a farm. In 1990 also Ahmed Juma left the band and moved to the United States to study as a sound engineer. When he returned to Kenya, he founded one of the first digital recording studios in the country, Sync Studios. Suleiman, founding leader of Mombasa Roots, left in 2005 and went to live in Canada. All these were replaced over the years by a number of other musicians, including Jacky Freeman (vocals), Salim Karama (drums), Hassan Swaleh (keyboards), Edward Toya Farrar (guitar) and Mohamed Khalifa (percussions). For a while, the personnel also included the Nazareth Sisters, a female duet from Mombasa, as well as Saeed Tito, Catherine Wekesa, Adam Solomon, and [usan Kahumbu.

== Discography ==
- 1987: Msa Mombasa (Jambo Bwana / Msa Mombasa / Mama Sofia / Malaika / Kata / Disco Chakacha / Reggae Sound of Africa / Kasha Langu / Karibishe / Mezea Tu (Lele Mama))
- 1999: Lele Mama (Ngongoro Ngongoro / Imbube / Karibuni / Reggae Sound of Africa / Kasha / Mombasa Island / Meli / Malaika / Karibishe / Mama Sofia / Lele Mama / Jambo Bwana / Disco Chakacha / Kata)

== See also ==
- Safari Sound Band
- Them Mushrooms
