= Art release =

Premiere of an artistic production

An art release is the premiere of an artistic production and its presentation and marketing to the public. In contemporary production, the art release materials often use a design software, and is kept as short and simple as possible.

== Film ==
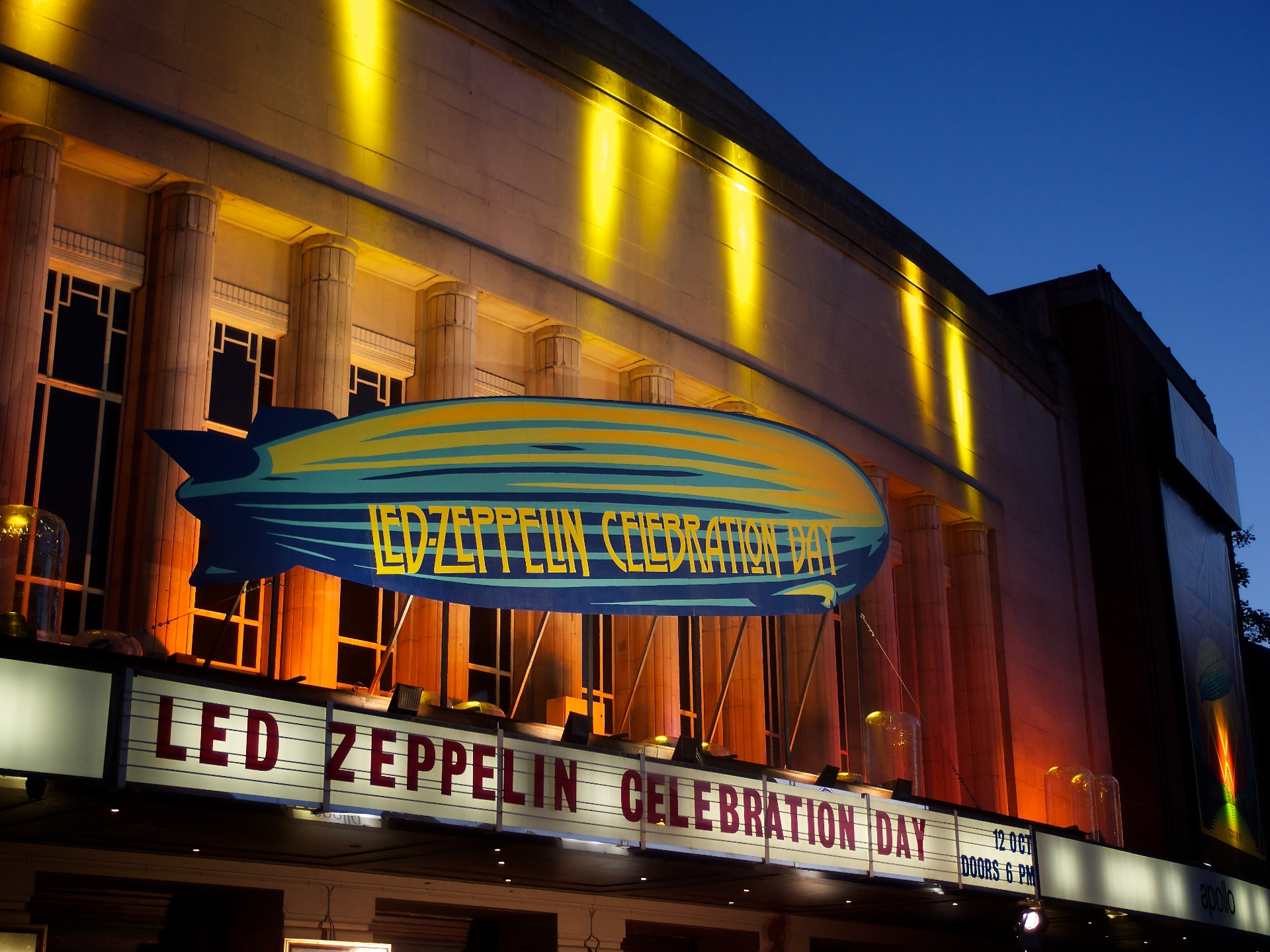
Film premieres can be elaborate media events, such as this 2012 exhibition of Celebration Day with promotional artwork on the Hammersmith Apollo.

A film release is the authorization by the owner of a completed film to a public exhibition of the film. The exhibition may be in theaters or for home viewing. A film's release date and the method of release is part of the marketing of the film. It may be a wide or limited release. A roadshow theatrical release is the practice of opening a film in a limited number of theaters in major cities for a specific period of time before the wide release of the film.

The process may involve finding a film distributor. A film's marketing may involve the film being shown at a film festival or trade show to attract distributor attention and, if successful, may then be released by the distributor.

=== Delayed release ===
A delayed release or late release in the film industry refers to the relatively late release of a film to the public. A release can be postponed due to the sometimes difficult transition of the production or post-production to the sales and distribution phase of the film production cycle. Due to several factors a film release can be delayed:

1. Problems during post-production of an artistic nature.
2. Political problems or censorship regarding the film.
3. Economic problems relating to limitations in the film budget.

These problems can be resolved by overcoming artistic problems, making politically correct or commercially successful changes to the film/or relieving budgetary problems.

== Music ==
In the music industry, a release usually is a creative output from an artist, available for sale or distribution; a broad term covering the many different formats music can be released in, and different forms of pieces (singles, albums, extended plays, etc.).

The word can also refer to the event at which an album or single is first offered for sale in record stores. Also an album launch, or single launch.

Musical performers often self-release (self-publish) their recordings without the involvement of an established record label. While some acts who enjoy local or small scale popularity have started their own labels in order to release their music through stores, others simply sell the music directly to customers, for example, making it available to those at their live concerts. With the growth of the Internet as a medium for publicizing and distributing music, many musical acts have sold their recordings over the Internet without a label. Unlike self-publishing a novel, which is usually done only when no other options exist, even well-established musicians will choose to self-release recordings. Music managers are increasingly getting involved in such releases and with the advent of artist management labels which have stepped in to save the situation. In Kenya, for example, most record labels only handle production, thus leading to a situation where records are marketed less. This has prompted music companies like Grosspool Music to sign independent artists and manage their branding, releases, and marketing.

== See also ==
- Development hell
- Roadshow theatrical release
- Legal release: "music release" may also refer to a legal release of music (e.g. for film)
- Reissue, or re-release
- Surprise release
