= List of Wanyika bands =

The Wanyika bands refer to the various offshoots of the prominent Tanzanian/Kenyan band Simba Wanyika. These bands were all Kenya-based, although their central leaders - Wilson Kinyonga, George Kinyonga, Omar Shabani, John Ngereza and Issa Juma - all hailed from Tanzania. Listed here are also their Tanzania-based precursors.

- Jamhuri Jazz Band was founded in Tanganyika in the late 1950s, and was one of the more popular Tanzanian music groups. Wilson Kinyonga & George Kinyonga joined it in 1966 and played with it for the next four years before leaving in December 1970 to found Arusha Jazz Band.
- Arusha Jazz Band was founded in Arusha, Tanzania in 1970 by Wilson & George Kinyonga, along with their brother William Kinyonga and three other musicians.
- Simba Wanyika, Wilson & George Kinyonga moved to Kenya in 1971 and changed the name Arusha Jazz Band to Simba Wanyika.
- Les Wanyika. In 1978, a number of members including rhythm guitarist Omar Shabani quit Simba Wanyika and formed Les Wanyika, which also briefly recorded under the name Les Moto-Moto.
- Orchestra Jobiso. Simba Wanyika was further diminished in 1980 when George Kinyonga quit and formed Orchestra Jobiso. He eventually rejoined Simba Wanyika.
- Super Wanyika Stars. The remaining Jobiso members joined forces with former Les Wanyika vocalist Issa Juma to form another "Wanyika" splinter group, variously entitled Super Wanyika Stars, Wanyika Stars, Super Wanyika, Wanyika Super Les Les etc.
- Simba Wanyika Original. Simba Wanyika added "Original" to their name to prevent confusion with Les Wanyika and its splinter group, Super Wanyika Stars.
- MAS System, created by guitarist Abu Omar when he was laid off from Simba Wanyika after they decided to reduce from seven members to five.
- Mavalo Kings, created by former members of Simba Wanyika and Les Wanyika.
- Everest Kings, consists of various Wanyika veterans.
