= Jambo Bwana =

1982 Kenyan pop song

"Jambo Bwana" (in Swahili "Hello Sir") is a Kenyan pop song also popular in Tanzania. It was first released in 1982 by Kenyan band Them Mushrooms, and later covered by a number of other groups and artists, including Mombasa Roots, Safari Sound Band, Khadja Nin, Adam Solomon, Mani Kollengode, and the German group Boney M. Some versions come under different titles, such as "Jambo Jambo" and "Hakuna Matata".

"Jambo Bwana" has been largely adopted as a hotel pop song, targeting a tourist audience. Its lyrics includes several common phrases and greetings in Swahili, such as habari gani? nzuri sana ("how are you doing? very well") and hakuna matata ("no problem, no worries"). The original version by Them Mushrooms also included lines celebrating Swahili language, reggae music, Africa, and "mushroom soup" (a reference to psilocybin mushrooms).

== Popularity ==
"Jambo Bwana" by Them Mushrooms was a huge commercial success, selling over 200,000 copies between 1982 and 1987 and getting platinum certification in Kenya. As a consequence of this popularity, many other bands covered the song, in some cases with similar success; the version by Safari Sound Band, in particular, is one of the most played songs in tourist venues in East Africa. The use of the Swahili phrase "hakuna matata" in Disney's "The Lion King" is a reference to the chorus of the song.

Them Mushrooms released the song in several of their albums, and both their version and cover versions of the song are found in many compilations of African pop music, including those dedicated to parties and children (such as the African Playground CD published by Putumayo Kids).

The song was featured in the 2019 film Where’d You Go Bernadette, directed by Richard Linklater and starring Cate Blanchett.

== Covers ==
Some of the covers of "Jambo Bwana" come under different titles and have modified lyrics. The Boney M. version, released in 1983, is entitled "Jambo - Hakuna Matata" and its lyrics are in English and almost completely different; only the "jambo bwana" and "hakuna matata" lines have been preserved. The Safari Sound Band version "Jambo Jambo" has the central part of the lyrics changed, with references to reggae and mushrooms being replaced by other tourist-oriented common Swahili phrases such as Kenya ni nchi nzuri ("Kenya is a beautiful country"). In 2016, a cover was made by Kenyan musician Mani Kollengode.

=== Partial list of "Jambo Bwana" versions ===
Artist	Title	Album	Year	Notes
Them Mushrooms	"Jambo Bwana"		1982	Released on several albums, including Jambo Bwana and Songs from Kenya (Them Mushrooms) and African Playground (Putumayo compilation)
Boney M.	"Jambo - Hakuna Matata"		1983	Only released as a single, with lyrics in English
Mombasa Roots	"Jambo Bwana"	Msa Mombasa	1987	
Bo Katzman & the Katz Kids	"Jambo Bwana"	Katz Kids Singed Wälthits	1990	
Safari Sound Band	"Jambo Jambo"	Mambo Jambo (2001), The Best of African Songs, and others	1999	Simplified lyrics
Love Whip	"Jambo Bwana"	Bouncehall	2003	
Adam Solomon	"Jambo Bwana / Hakuna Matata"	Mti Wa Maisha	2004	
Klaus Hallen	"Jambo Bwana / Lala Salama"	Samba Collection		
Khadja Nin	"Jambo Bwana"			Based on Safari Sound Band's lyrics
Mani Kollengode	"Jambo Bwana"		2016	An English rendition

=== Boney M. version ===
"Jambo - Hakuna Matata (No Problems)"

Single by Boney M.
- Released: September 1983
- Recorded: 1983
- Genre: Pop, Disco
- Length: 4:06 (1st mix); 3:39 (Final mix)
- Label: Sony BMG
- Songwriters: Teddy Kalanda-Harrison, Them Mushrooms
- Producer: Frank Farian

Boney M. singles chronology
"Kenya Hakuna Matata" (1980)	"Jambo - Hakuna Matata (No Problems)" (1983)	"Jambo Bwana Hakuna Matata" (1984)

Music video
- "Boney M. - Jambo - Hakuna Matata (No Problems) (Official Video)" on YouTube

In 1983, German group Boney M. released "Jambo - Hakuna Matata". Liz Mitchell provided the song's lead vocals, backed by Reggie Tsiboe, Frank Farian, Marcia Barrett, Cathy Bartney, Madeleine Davis, and Judy Cheeks. The single was intended to be included in the group's untitled seventh album, to be released in the fall of 1983, but didn't happen.

Several mixes of "Jambo" were made. The 4:06 mix (as featured in the accompanying music video) was only released in Spain and Portugal. A 3:39 edit was released elsewhere. The full 7:44 version was only released on the Spanish and Portuguese 12" singles - the German 12" single (despite crediting the timing 7:42 on the label) was actually an edit of 5:35. In France, an even shorter edit 5:15 was released.
