= No problem =

English expression, used as a response to thanks

No problem is an English expression, used as a response to thanks (among other functions). It is regarded by some as a less formal alternative to you're welcome, which shares the same function.

== Informality ==
In the culture of younger Americans, no problem is often used as a more conversational alternative to you're welcome.

It is widely believed that younger speakers especially favor no problem over you're welcome, and empirical research has corroborated this belief.

== No problemo ==
"No problemo" is "a popular elaboration" of "no problem" also used and popularized in North American English.

The expression is sometimes used as an instance of "pseudo-Spanish" or Mock Spanish. An early example appears in a 1959 edition of the American Import and Export Bulletin, with an advertisement stating: "Foreign shipping is No Problemo". Its usage as a Spanish expression is incorrect; a correct translation would be ningún problema, sin problema or no hay problema. Many Spanish words from Latin roots that have English cognates have an -o in Spanish from the masculine Latin suffix -us, such as "insect" (insecto), "pilot" (piloto), and "leopard" (leopardo); however, "problem" belongs to the group of words ending with an a in Spanish that have a similar English counterpart, such as "poet" (poeta), "ceramic" (cerámica) and "rat" (rata). In the case of problema, this is because it has a Greek 'ma' ending, and as such is among the Iberian words ending in 'ma', such as tema, which is in fact masculine.

== See also ==
- No worries
- Hakuna matata
