= Jambo (greeting) =

Swahili greeting

Jambo is a Swahili greeting or salutation. It is similar in meaning to the English word Hello.

== Linguistically ==
Specifically, Jambo is a Swahili language word that belongs to noun classes 5-6 for "collectives". Jambo primarily means 'affair', in the sense of commercial, professional, public or personal business.

Etymologically it is from amba (-amba) meaning to say. It is a cognate with Zulu. Secondary meanings include dealing with a thing, issue or matter.

== First use ==
The spoken word "Jambo" was once used as a greeting among traders of the Swahili coast of southeast Africa. While less formal, it is in widespread use in East Africa and beyond. While similar in use to the English word "hello," it really meant to come and settle one's affairs in the business sense. It was used by traders from India, China and other lands before the Portuguese Vasco da Gama visited the area in 1498. It is in current use.

== Colonial use ==
During the western European "Scramble for Africa" which brought a period of Imperialism and East African European colonialism, the Swahili word "Bwana" was used to refer to the western Europeans. Briefly, the word today refers to "Mister" or big boss or an important person, and is occasionally used in a derogatory manner. But the historical reality of it was simply "Master." The British dictionary or older English usage refers the word "Master" as a male person who is in charge of others or of a task; Large British sailing ships, for example, typically had both a captain and a sailing master, the latter in charge of the detailed handling of the ship. In many ways in East Africa the combined phrase "Jambo Bwana!" (Hello, Master!) became viewed as "Hello, Slave Driver" or "Hello, Slave Master" by those seeking independence especially in Colonial East Africa.

== Postcolonial use ==
After independence and over a half century of Independence, many still use the word "Jambo!" And some enterprising East Africans use the old imperialist welcoming phrase "Jambo Bwana!" as a welcome greeting seeking tourist dollars.

"Jambo Bwana!" (translated as "Hello Mister!"), is also notably one of the best internationally known Kenyan hotel pop songs. That welcoming song, with some local variations including the informal name of the "Jambo! Jambo!", is sometimes used to greet visitors to Kenya.

Today, more traditional greeting or welcoming terms are encouraged for tourists to better understand and to relate to the local people. For example: In Tanzania and for the Swahili language, there are many tourist guides and educational pages which provide common phrases. Below are four basic ways in Swahili to say "Hello!" and a basic polite reply after the dash.

1. Hujambo - more correct than Jambo! (how are you?) – Sijambo (seeJAmbo) (I am fine / no worries)
2. Habari? (any news?) – nzuri (nZOOree) (fine)
3. U hali gani? (oo HAlee GAnee) (how are you) – njema (fine)
4. Shikamoo (a young person to an elder) – marahaba

== Surname use ==
"Jambo" is also a surname in southern Africa. An example is Zhaimu Jambo, a retired Zimbabwean football player.

== Other uses ==
The word jamboree may be derived from the word jambo. A jamboree is a large gathering of Scouts. The word has also come to mean "a lavish or boisterous celebration or party".

== See also ==
- Aloha
- As-Salamu Alaykum
- Ciao
- Kia ora
- Namaste
- Shalom
- World Hello Day
