= Murphy's Law (disambiguation) =

Murphy's law is a popular adage regarding precaution in design.

Murphy's Law may also refer to:

== Film and television ==
- Murphy's Law (film), a 1986 action thriller featuring Charles Bronson
- Murphy's Law (American TV series), a 1988–1989 American television crime comedy-drama
- Murphy's Law (British TV series), a 2001–2007 British television police drama
- Milo Murphy's Law, a 2016 Disney XD series
- Murphy's Law of Love, a 2015 Taiwanese romantic comedy television series
- "Murphy's Law", an episode of The 100

== Music ==
- Murphy's Law (band), a hardcore punk band from New York
  - Murphy's Law (Murphy's Law album), their 1986 album
- Murphy's Law (Murphy Lee album), 2003
- "Murphy's Law" (Chéri song), 1982
- "Murphy's Law" (Róisín Murphy song), 2020
- "Murphy's Law", a song by Priestess from the album Prior to the Fire

== Other uses ==
- Murphy's Law (novel), Colin Bateman novel based on the British TV series

== See also ==
- Muphry's law, with similar title, applying to proof-reading
- Murfy's fLaw, a rock band from Kenya
- Phil Murphy § Policy proposals
