= Please =

English word indicating politeness

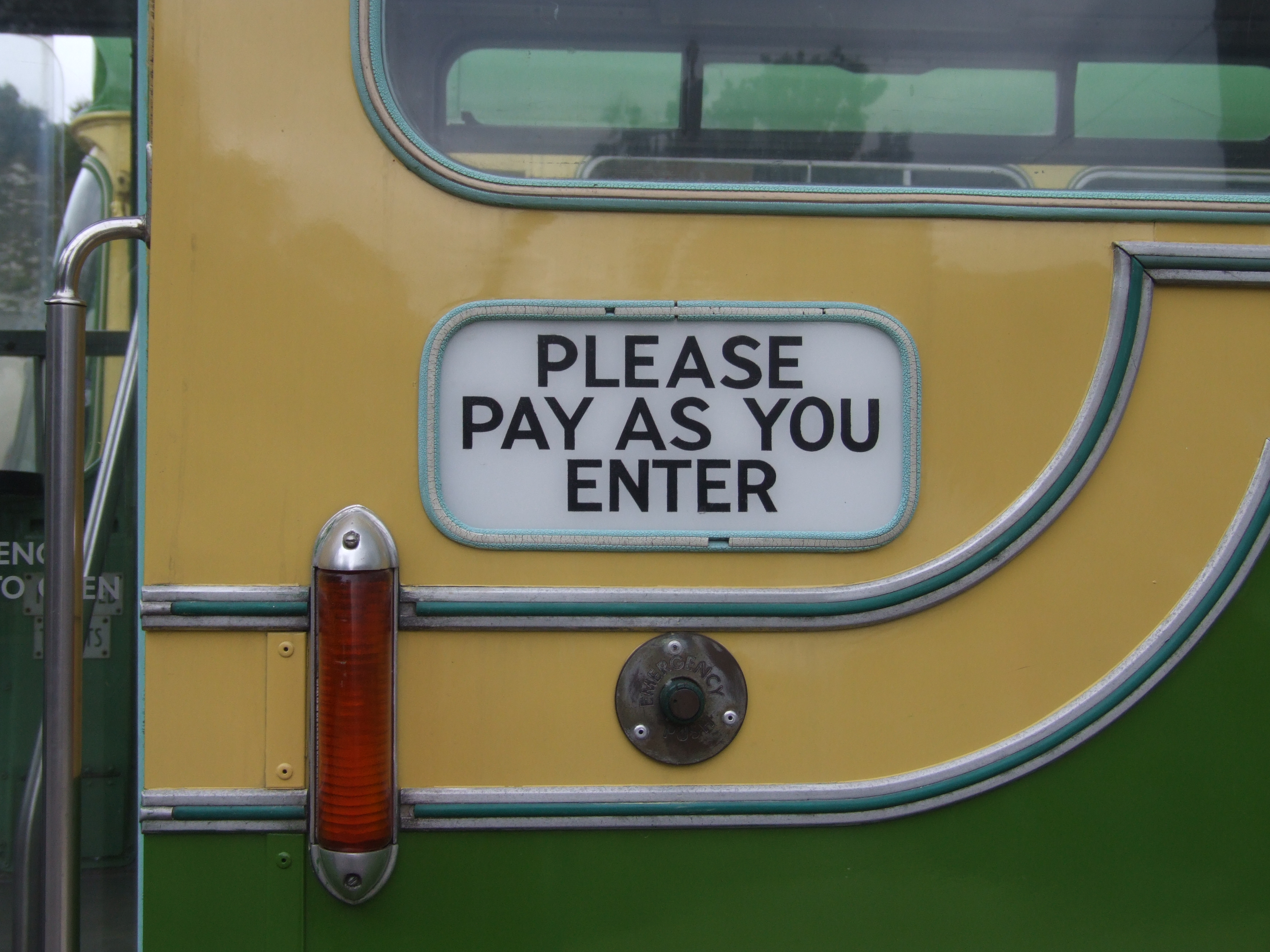
A polite notice on the side of a bus that reads "please pay as you enter". Despite the politeness of the phrase, paying is not optional.

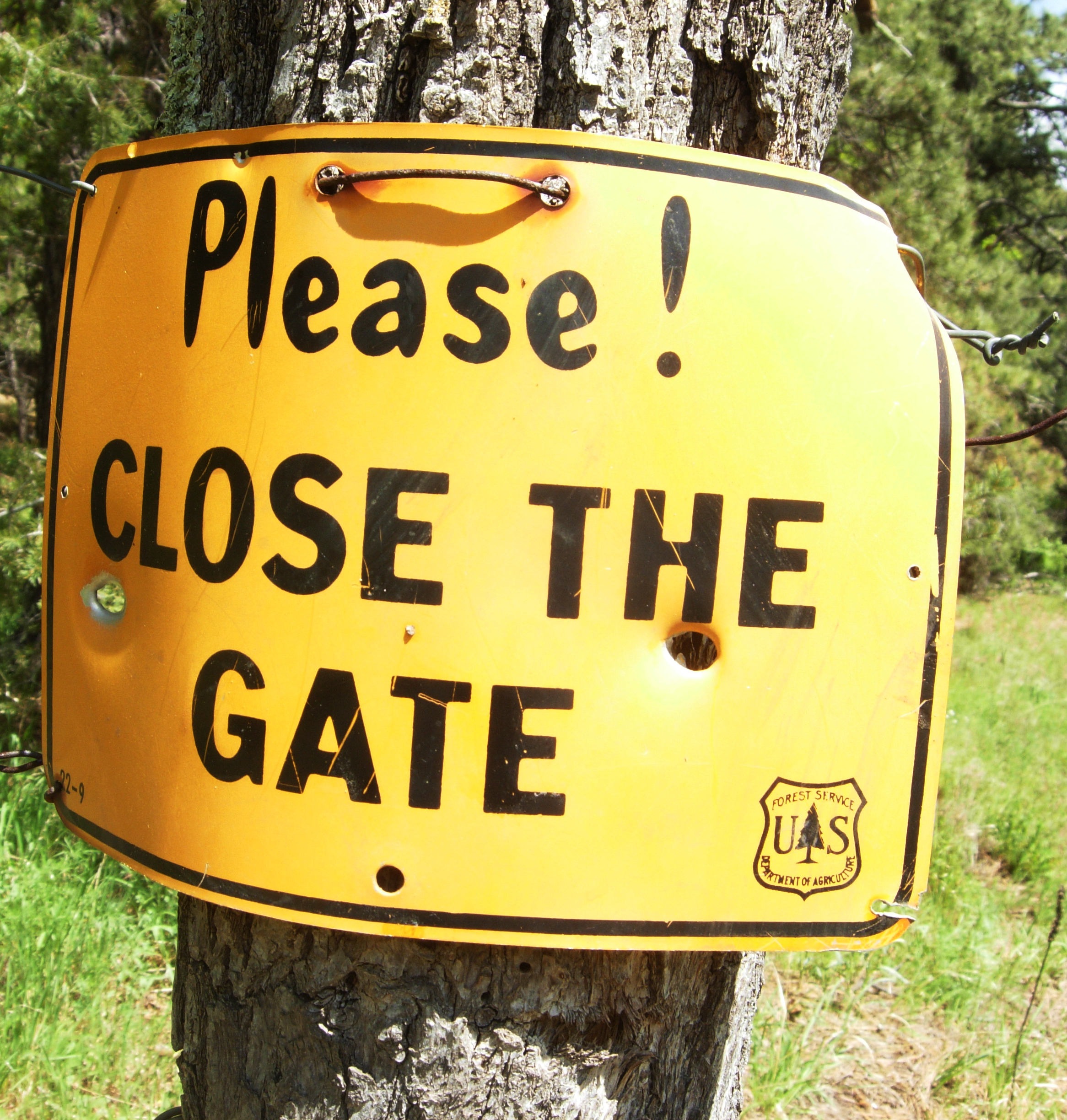
A sign asking visitors to "Please! Close the gate" at Lincoln National Forest.

Please is a word used in the English language to indicate politeness and respect while making a request. Derived from shortening the phrase "if you please" or "if it please(s) you", the term has taken on substantial nuance based on its intonation and the relationship between the persons between whom it is used. In much of the Western world, use of the word is considered proper etiquette, and parents and authority figures often imprint upon children the importance of saying "please" when asking for something from an early age, leading to the description of the term as "the magic word".

== Origin and understanding ==
"Please" is a shortening of the phrase, if you please, an intransitive, ergative form taken from if it please you, which is in turn a calque of the French s'il vous plaît, which replaced pray. The exact time frame of the shortening is unknown, though it has been noted that this form appears not to have been known to William Shakespeare, for whom "please you" is the shortest form used in any of his works. A variation of the phrase, "may it please the court", remains in use as a formality for attorneys addressing judges in legal proceedings. Despite its straightforward definition as a term of courtesy, "please" has become highly variable in its meaning based on its intonation.

The use of "please" often reflects an illocutionary act, making its presence in a sentence more a matter of functionality than politeness, but it remains the case that omitting "please" in certain circumstances can be perceived as impoliteness. On a philosophical level, it has been argued that use of "please" embodies the Kantian ethic of treating the person to whom it is spoken as an end, rather than a means, acknowledging them to be inherently worthy of respect.

One study found that using "please" in unusual situations, such as with a seller asking someone to buy something for a charitable cause, yielded a negative result, with customers being less likely to make a purchase when it was used. The researchers theorized that this was because the use of "please" focused the attention of the customer on the seller rather than the cause, and the unusual circumstance of use made the customers suspicious of the interaction.

Another study found that when asking strangers of the opposite sex to help with a task like looking for a lost earring or watching a bicycle while the experimenter stepped away, asking without saying "please" was actually more effective in gaining the requested help, possibly because saying "please" indicates the weaker position of lacking an expectation that the other person will comply. Similarly, one group of researchers found that saying "please" as part of a request was associated with situations in which the request occurred in an "inhospitable interactional environment," such as when the other party had shown prior unwillingness to perform the requested action. Another study differentiated between uses by pitch contour, finding "that please-requests ending in a rising contour occurred in situations where the participants were equal in power and status", while those with a falling contour "occurred in unequal encounters, and were much closer to commands than requests".

The perception that use of "please" diminishes the forcefulness of the request does not necessarily change the legal status of a phrase incorporating it. In one case, for example, a federal court in Florida ruled that where a legal document stated, "If you dispute this balance or the validity of this debt, please let us know in writing", the use of "please" did not make the clause merely an optional request—particularly where the document went on to say that in the absence of a written dispute, it would be presumed that there was no dispute. In a North Dakota case where a police officer asked a suspect to "please unlock the door", the court found that the use of "please" in an utterance "can be viewed as a request rather than an order or command", so that it did not constitute a stop or a seizure of the person being asked.

== Learning to use the term ==
In certain Western cultures, "parents put a lot of effort into teaching their children to be polite, to say 'thank you' or 'please' for every single favor done by anyone". One method of imparting the habit of saying "please" is to respond to requests with an instruction like "say please", or a question like "what is the magic word?" The latter method has been criticized, as it has been suggested that asking "What's the magic word?" frames the question in a negative context of the child being forgetful, and that the parent should merely remind the child to "Say please and thank you". It has also been noted that "teachers easily fall into the pattern of withholding food from children while they elicit the appropriate 'please'", which "may teach children that the words 'please' and 'thank you' are tokens they must use to get their food rather than genuine expressions of gratitude". Other sources consider the use of phrases like "What's the magic word?" to constitute "a less intrusive prompt" than directly reminding the child to say please.

Parents and other role models or authority figures can also effectively reinforce in children the habit of saying please by regularly using the term themselves in making requests to the child, or to others in the presence of the child. Children as young as two have been observed to spontaneously add "please" to the ends of requests, possibly as a self-correcting behavior when gauging the apparent reaction to the request.

== Cultural variations ==
Western cultures tend to promote the use of "please" in requests made to anyone, including family members, although other cultures may not promote the use of such formalities in exchanges within the family. A 1902 newspaper article suggested that use of "please" in England was, at that time, limited to servants, and that children who used it would find that it "stamped them as underbred", leading to the conclusion that "please" would fall out of use elsewhere. The politeness function of "please" can be accomplished by other phrases, such as "would you mind" or "would you be so kind". Although other terms might accomplish the same end, "the word 'please' is an agreed-upon device for showing respect".

== See also ==
- RSVP
