= She'll be right =

Idiom

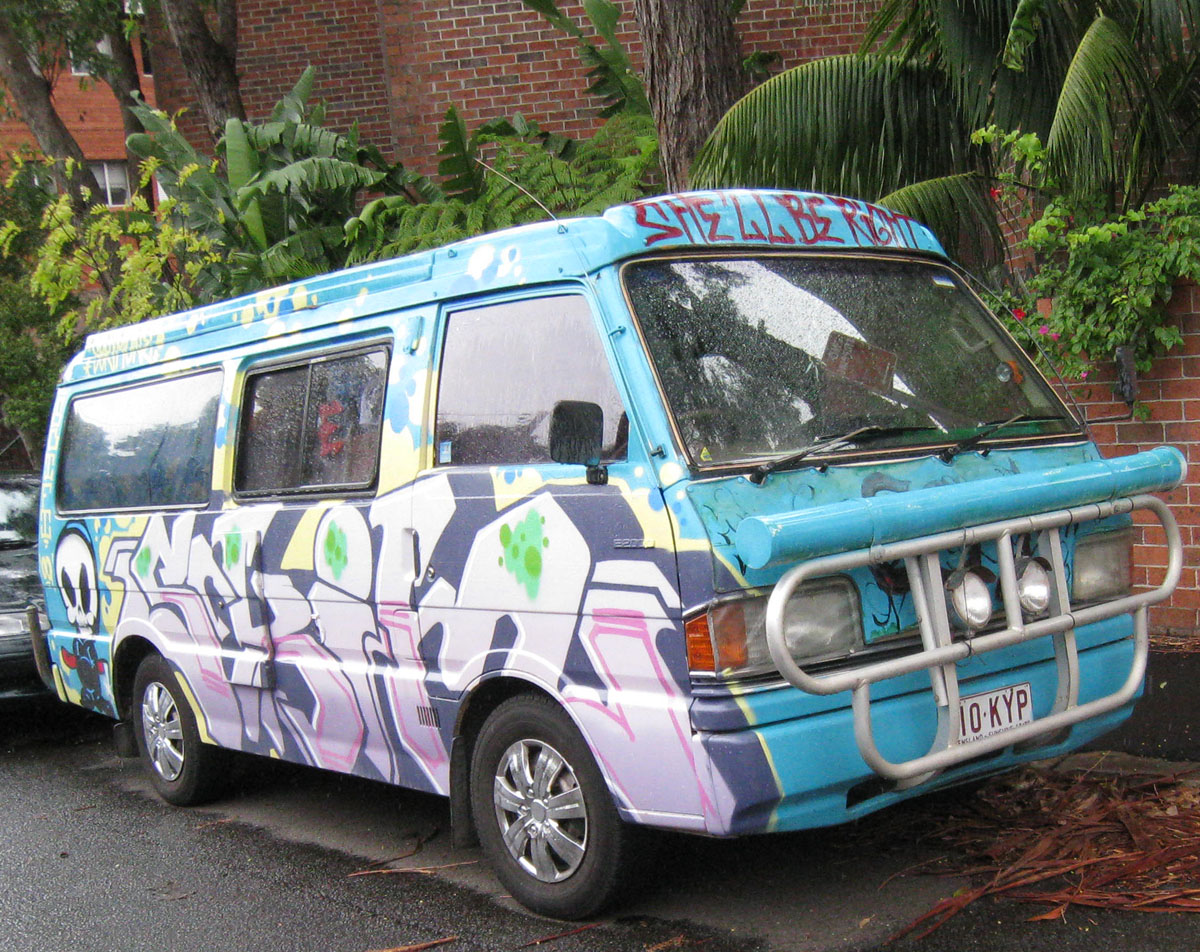
Graffiti on van with the expression "she'll be right" above the windscreen

She'll be right (often followed by a friendly term of address such as mate) is a frequently used idiom in Australian and New Zealand culture that expresses the belief that "whatever is wrong will right itself with time", which is considered to be either an optimistic or apathetic outlook.

== Background ==
The term can also be used to refer to a situation or object which is not perfect but is good enough to fulfil its purpose.

In this usage, "she" represents everything, allowing the phrase to be used both in circumstances of extreme hardship and in casual speech referring to everyday events. Related terms also used with the same meaning include She'll be apples (Australia) and She's good (New Zealand).

Modern usages of the term can also have negative connotations, with "a she'll-be-right attitude" referring to a willingness to accept poor solutions, or to be an expression of misplaced optimism and laziness, rather than confidence.

== See also ==
- No worries
