= Simba Wanyika =

Kenyan-based band

Simba Wanyika was a Kenyan-based band created in 1971 by Tanzanian brothers Wilson Kinyonga and George Kinyonga, and disbanded in 1994. Simba Wanyika and its two offshoots, Les Wanyika and Super Wanyika Stars, became some of the most popular bands in Kenya. Their guitar-driven sound, inspired by the Soukous guitarist Dr. Nico, combined highly melodic rumba with lyrics sung in Swahili. Simba wa nyika means "Lions of the Savannah" in Swahili.

Wilson Kinyonga and George Kinyonga began as musicians in their hometown Tanga in Tanzania when they joined Jamhuri Jazz Band in 1966. They moved to Arusha in 1970 and formed Arusha Jazz with their other brother, William Kinyonga. During this period, musicians could travel freely between Kenya and Tanzania, and Kenyan popular music became heavily influenced by Tanzanian rumba musicians. In 1971 the Kinyonga brothers moved to Kenya and created Simba Wanyika. The band played at nightclubs and bars in the Nairobi area, and developed an enthusiastic following, and by the mid-1970s, they were well known throughout Kenya, thanks to hits like "Mwongele" and "Wana Wanyika". They had a harder sound than most rumba bands and were almost unchallenged in that area in Kenya due to the closing of the Tanzanian border in 1977.

The restrictions enforced on the Kenya-Tanzania border consequently led to the divergence of Kenyan popular music towards the emerging benga music. Simba Wanyika continued playing rumba, and was still quite popular when the band split in the late 1970s when rhythm guitarist Omar Shabani (commonly referred to as Professor Omar Shabani) took many of the band's musicians and forming Les Wanyika. In 1980, George Kinyonga also quit Simba Wanyika, taking more musicians with him to form Orchestra Jobiso. He eventually rejoined Simba Wanyika while still working with Jobiso on side projects. Simba Wanyika later changed their name to "Simba Wanyika Original" to prevent confusion with Les Wanyika and its splinter group, Super Wanyika Stars.

Simba Wanyika regained its popularity in the mid-1980s, releasing many hits and touring Europe in 1989. They disbanded in 1994, but several offshoots of the band still continue to play.

== Discography ==
Contributing artist

- The Rough Guide to the Music of Kenya and Tanzania (1996, World Music Network)

Compilations

- Kenya Special : Volume Two Selected East African recordings from the 1970s & 80s (2016, Soundway)

== See also ==
- List of Wanyika bands, lists many of the offshoots of Simba Wanyika.
- Music of Kenya
- Music of Tanzania
