= Chakacha =

East African music and dance style

Chakacha is a traditional music and dance style (a ngoma performance) of the Swahili people of coastal Kenya and Tanzania, originally associated with weddings and performed and watched only by women. Men were not allowed to attend chakacha dance parties. The women dress in very lightclothing and wear a belt around their waists for ease of movement. The hip-swaying dance movements of Chakacha also bear some resemblance with Middle Eastern belly dances.

Chakacha shares similar music and Swahili lyrics with Taarab, a popular music style of the Swahili coast, often performed by women singers and a male orchestra. In the late 20th century, musical groups such as Mombasa Roots, Safari Sound Band and Them Mushrooms have adapted this style to Afropop music.
