= Thank you =

Expression of gratitude in the English language

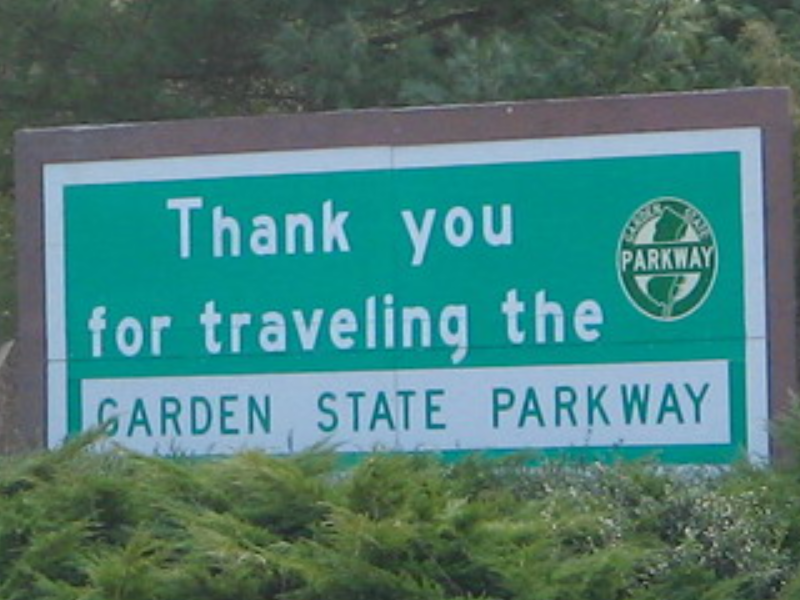
Sign thanking visitors for using a highway in New Jersey

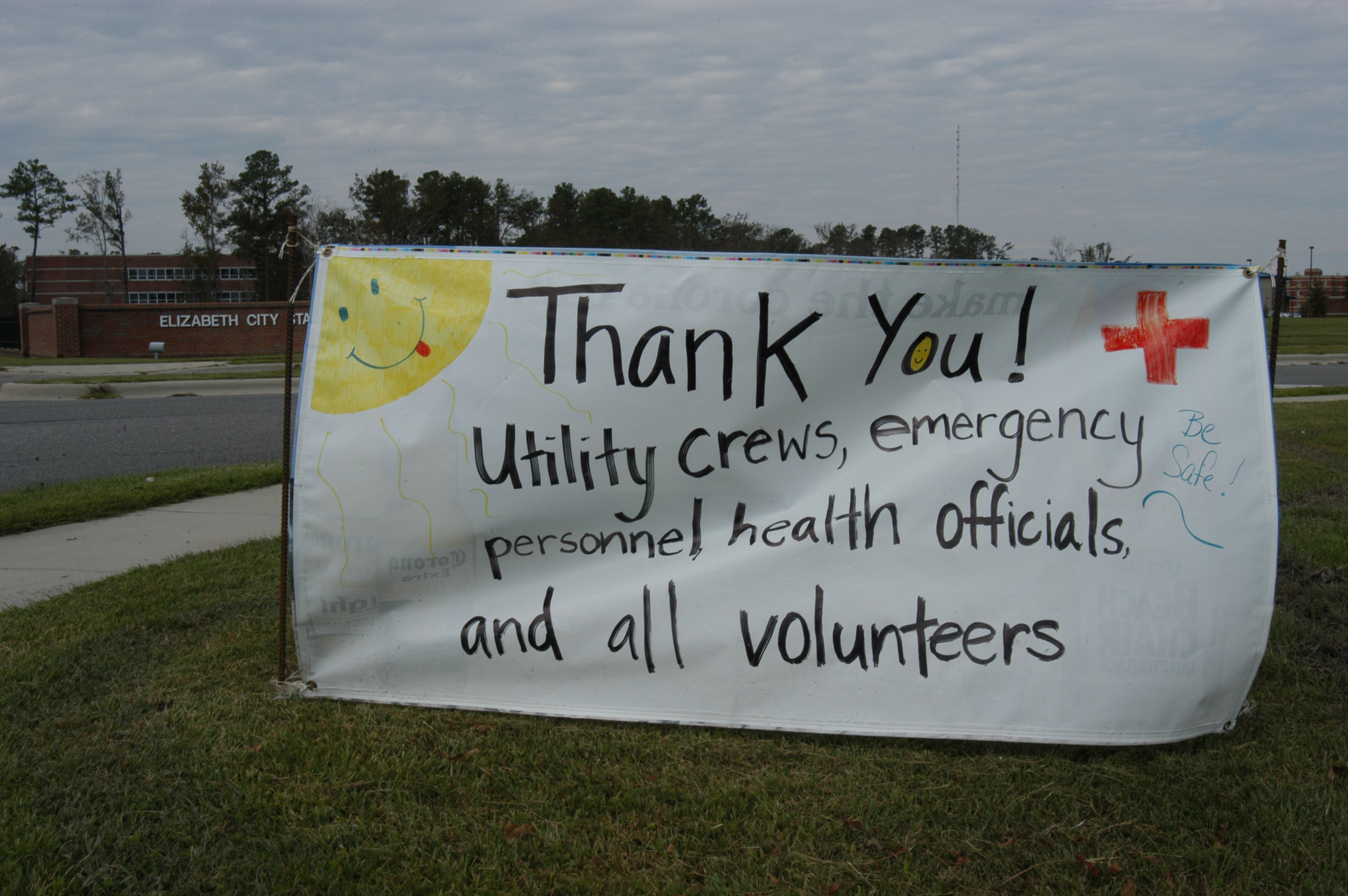
Hand-made sign thanking emergency workers for their hurricane response in Elizabeth City, North Carolina

Thank you (often expanded to thank you very much or thanks a lot, or informally abbreviated to thanks or alternately as many thanks) is a common expression of gratitude in the English language. The term itself originated as a shortened form of the expression "I thank you". Children in certain Western cultures are taught early on to say please and thank you reflexively, and the phrase itself has taken on a variety of nuances based on intonation, and can have various generally positive social effects.

== Learning to use the term ==
Use of the phrase indicates politeness, and in certain Western cultures, "parents put a lot of effort into teaching their children to be polite, to say 'thank you' or 'please' for every single favor done by anyone", though the practice of quizzing children on what they should say has been criticized as framing the question in a negative context of the child being forgetful, and that the parent should merely remind the child to "Say please and thank you". It has generally been observed that "parents train their kids to say 'thank you' whether they feel thankful or not", and has specifically been noted that withholding food from children in order to elicit politeness "may teach children that the words 'please' and 'thank you' are tokens they must use to get their food rather than genuine expressions of gratitude".

== Social function ==
Philosopher David J. Gunkel notes that "[i]t is now common for users to say 'thank you' to their digital assistants and speech dialogue systems (SDS), like Amazon's Echo/Alexa, Google Home, and Apple's Siri". Gunkel notes that this may appear to be superfluous, since the statement neither offers information to the system for processing, nor is capable of being processed by the system and understood as a command, but concludes that it is nevertheless socially important because it recognizes the system as fulfilling a social function.

Use of the phrase by teachers has been observed to elicit better responses in the teaching of children:

We notice that in the classrooms of effective teachers, the phrase "thank you" is uttered often, much more so than in the classrooms of less effective teachers. We also find that in classrooms where teachers use the phrase "thank you" often, students also use the phrase more often than they do in the classrooms of less effective teachers.

In other environs, one study found that regular patrons of a restaurant gave bigger tips when servers wrote "Thank you" on their checks.

As with various other formal phrases, the phrase "Thank you" can be varied in speaking so as to convey many different meanings. For example, "no, thank you" or "no thanks" are often used to indicate politeness while declining an offer. It can also be incorporated into phrases sarcastically or bitterly, as with the phrase, "thanks for nothing". Common responses for "thank you" include "you're welcome", "don't mention it", or, more recently, according to a 2018 HuffPost article, "no problem".

== Cultural variations ==
A wide variety of verbal cues for the expression of gratitude exist in different languages. A 2012 Vanity Fair poll indicated that "thank you" was the phrase American travelers abroad, especially in east Asian Nations, felt was most important to learn how to say in the language of the country being visited.

It has been observed that in some versions of African English (specifically in Kenyan English), "thank you" is often used as a traditional response to a departing person saying "goodbye".

== Internet abbreviation ==
People sometimes say TY, TU (Thank You), THX, THNX, TNX (Thanks), TIA (Thanks In Advance) and TYSM (Thank You So Much) as an internet chat abbreviation.

== See also ==
- Deo gratias, Latin phrase meaning "thanks [be] to God"
- God bless you
