= Hakuna matata =

Swahili phrase meaning "no worries"

"Hakuna matata" (pronounced [hɑˈkunɑ mɑˈtɑtɑ]) is a Swahili language phrase. In English, it means "no trouble" or "no worries" and "take it easy" (literally hakuna: "there is no/there are no"; matata: "worries"). The 1994 Walt Disney Animation Studios animated film The Lion King brought the phrase to Western prominence in one of its most popular songs, in which it is translated as "no worries". The song is often heard at Disney's resorts, hotels, and amusement parks.

== Boney M. song ==
In 1983, German group Boney M. released "Jambo — Hakuna Matata", an English-language version of the song Jambo Bwana by Kenyan group Them Mushrooms. Liz Mitchell provided the song's lead vocals, backed by Reggie Tsiboe, Cathy Bartney, Madeleine Davis and Judy Cheeks. The single performed poorly, reaching number 48 in the German charts and causing it to be omitted from the group's seventh album Ten Thousand Lightyears, released in 1984.

== The Lion King song ==
In 1994, the Walt Disney Feature Animation animated film The Lion King brought the phrase international recognition, featuring it prominently in the plot and devoting a song to it. A meerkat and a warthog, Timon and Pumbaa, teach Simba, a lion cub, that he should forget his troubled past and live in the present. The song was written by Elton John (music) and Tim Rice (lyrics), who found the term in a Swahili phrasebook. It was nominated for Best Original Song at the 1995 Academy Awards, and was later ranked the 99th best song in movie history by the American Film Institute on its list AFI's 100 Years...100 Songs.

== Cultural appropriation charge ==
In 2003, Disney was granted a trademark protecting the phrase from being used on clothing and footwear. Prior to the release of the 2019 remake, the trademark caused controversy in East Africa, where Disney was accused of cultural appropriation. More than 50,000 people signed a petition on Change.org asking Disney to drop the trademark.

== See also ==
- Ataraxia
- No worries
- Ubuntu philosophy
