= Rhino Band =

- Origin: Kenya
- Years active: 1946–?

The Rhino Band was a popular band in Kenya. It was in formed in 1946 from the Entertainment Unit of the King's African Rifles. Their music did not win any awards, however a prominent member, George Senoga-Zake, jointly composed the Kenyan National Anthem.
