= Jamhuri Jazz Band =

Dance band founded In Tanzania

Jamhuri Jazz Band was a dance band founded as the Nyamwezi Jazz Band in the late 1950s in Tanga, Tanzania, when the country was known as Tanganyika. At the time dance bands were known as "jazz bands" in East Africa, even if they did not play jazz music. It was renamed the Jamhuri Jazz Band in 1966 on the orders of the government of Tanzania because of the tribalism indicated by the word "Nyamwezi". It gained nationwide popularity. Jamhuri Jazz played a key role in the spread of the Congolese rumba sound throughout East Africa in the early seventies.

Wilson Kinyonga and George Kinyonga joined the band in 1966 and played with it for the next four years before leaving in December 1970 to form Arusha Jazz Band and later Simba Wanyika, one of the most influential music groups in East Africa. Jamhuri Jazz Band started as Young Nyamwezi Jazz Band and was financed and managed by Joseph Bagabuje and recruited John Kijiko.
