= Christine Kamau =

Kenyan jazz musician

- Born: Nakuru, Kenya
- Origin: Nairobi, Kenya
- Genres: Jazz, Afro-jazz
- Occupations: Musician, composer
- Instruments: Trumpet, saxophone, piano
- Years active: 2010–present

Christine Kamau is a Kenyan jazz musician and composer, who plays the trumpet and the saxophone. She has performed at various Kenyan and international music venues and festivals. In 2012, she appeared in the BBC series 'African Beats', featuring emerging African musicians.

== Life and career ==
Raised in Nakuru, Kamau was interested in music from an early age. Encouraged by her parents, she studied music theory and classical piano from the age of 11. She continued her studies at the Kenya Conservatoire of Music, where she learnt the trumpet under Kagema Gichuhi. After her graduation, she has been playing trumpet in the Conservatoire's orchestra as well as in her own band African People.

Sponsored by the British Council's Mobility East Africa Travel Grant in 2017, Kamau travelled to Addis Ababa to collaborate with Ethio-jazz musicians. In April 2021, Kamau was invited by UNESCO Headquarters to participate in a round table on Jazz women in Africa, including short video clips of her and other African jazz women's music.

Specializing in African jazz, her tracks include "Nakuru Sunshine", "Conversations" and the eight-track album This is for You. The latter presents her compositions, combining jazz with benga and rhumba.
