= George Kinyonga =

Tanzanian musician

George Peter Kinyonga (February 20, 1950 – December 24, 1992) was a Tanzanian born musician who later migrated to Kenya together with his siblings Wilson Kinyonga and William Kinyonga.

Born in Tanzania to a Muslim mother called Mariam and a Christian father called Peter Kisaka both from Kigoma in western Tanzania. Peter Kinyonga and his elder brother Wilson Kinyonga founded the rumba band Simba Wanyika which would later spawn Les Wanyika, Super Wanyika Stars and other offshoots.

George and Wilson Kinyonga began as musicians in their home town Tanga in Tanzania when they joined Jamhuri Jazz Band in 1966. They moved to Arusha in 1970 and formed Arusha Jazz Band with their other brother, William Kinyonga. In 1970 they moved to Kenya and formed Simba Wanyika, which would become one of the most influential bands in the history of East African music.

== Early life and career beginnings ==
George Peter Kinyonga was born, according to him on February 20, 1950, to Peter Kisaka, a truck driver and a Muslim mother called Mariam. Little is known about Kinyonga's mother apart from a few fragments of information alluded to by her sons during various interviews, but what is known is that she was from Kigoma in western Tanzania. George Kinyonga, while speaking about a track called "Mama Nyange" from their Haleluya album, Kinyonga said... "This is a song about a step child who was always blamed for everything that goes wrong in the family. I remember my Mother Mariam used to sing with us this song when we were still young."" Kinyonga's Father Kisaka was a truck driver who was trained by the colonial army during World War II. A few years later, their father met and later fell in love with a young woman from Rwanda, and this later led to marriage. Kinyonga and his 2 brothers Wilson and William were later taken to live with their step mother. According to George Kinyonga, the day their father picked them from their mother was the traumatic day of their lives because it meant that they will never see their mother again. With their father away most of the time, life under their step mother became unbearable, and the boys started to stay away from home, always hanging out on the streets of tanga, something which made them to be involved in music. In 1966, George and his brother Wilson joined Jamhuri Jazz Band at this time George was only 16. Together with his brother, they became an integral part of the band as they composed a lot of songs which were sung and later recorded by the band. Due to royalty and pay issues, the Kinyonga brothers left Jamhuri Jazz Band in 1970 and later formed Arusha Jazz Band Which did not last long due to logistical challenges. In 1971, due to strain in the Tanzanian music industry, the Kinyonga brothers decided to look for greener pastures. They crossed into Kenya and settled in Mombasa after looking for work in Nairobi with no success, and later founded the Simba Wanyika band.

== Illness and death ==
In the late 80s, George began to suffer from different ailments.the ailments ranged from Pneumonia to Tuberculosis. In 1990 during a tour, he picked up a leg injury which proved to be a challenge to him. In 1992 he was brought down by a bout of Pneumonia which later made it difficult for him to sing, and, in fact the band even stopped playing his songs during gigs and tours, but he later performed two of his songs, Pamela and Daima during the Womad festival. This proved to be his last performance. When the band returned from the tour, he checked into a hospital where he would be confined for four weeks. When he was discharged, he remarked about the treatment in a letter, "The treatment has taken almost everything from me, Only rumba has remained."He was hopeful that he would recover, but his health grew from bad to worse. In around November, he was hospitalized again, and his condition now proved to be terminal. On December 23, George went back to be with his family and died a day later of Tuberculosis on 24 December. He was survived by his wife and six children.
