= Les Wanyika =

Band based in Kenya

- Origin: Tanzania, based in Kenya
- Genres: Rumba
- Years active: 1978–present
- Labels: Polydor, Poygram
- Members: Sijali Salum Zuwa; Tommy Malanga
- Past members: Rashid Juma; Omar Shabani; John Ngereza; Issa Juma; Phoney Mkwanyule

Les Wanyika is a band with Tanzanian and Kenyan members based in Nairobi, Kenya. It was formed in 1978 when drummer Rashid Juma, guitarist Omar Shabani, bassist Tom Malanga, saxophonist Sijali Salum Zuwa, and Phoney Mkwanyule left the Simba Wanyika Band. They were joined by guitarist John Ngereza and vocalist Issa Juma.

The Les Wanyika Band made many recordings, and known for their songs “Sina Makosa”, “Jessica”, “Paulina”, “Pamela”, and “Shirika la Mapenzi”.

Vocalist Issa Juma later left the band to concentrate on other musical projects. Omar Shabani died in 1998 while John Ngereza died two years later.

== Formation and history ==
In 1971, two brothers from the coastal region of Tanga Tanzania, Wilson and George Kinyonga formed a band they would later call Simba Wanyika, Swahili for Savannah Lions. Due to unsteady economic conditions in Tanzania in the 70's which strained the music industry, most of the artists at that time migrated to Kenya and other neighbouring countries in search of better conditions.

During that time, travelling between the two countries was made easy by the East African Community, a tripartite agreement of understanding among Kenya, Uganda, and Tanzania. After the collapse of the community in 1977, border crossings were made difficult, hence the eventual establishment of permanent base in Kenya by the group. With its development and growth, the band created several offshoots, but most notable was Les Wanyika.

Les Wanyika was formed in November 1978 by Rashid Juma, Omari Shabani, Tommy Malanga, Sijali Salum Zuwa and Phoney Mkwanyule. It was later joined by John Ngereza from Orch. Bwambe Bwambe, Issa Juma, Joseph Just, Mohammed Tika Abdallah, and Victor Boniface.

With Les Wanyika, new members of the group included both Tanzanians and Kenyans. The John Ngereza, Issa Juma, Omar Shabani, and Sijali Salum Zuwa were all from Tanzania, while Tommy Malanga and Rashid Juma were from Kenya. The band has a permanent base in Nairobi, playing in restaurants, clubs and various resorts.

Issa Juma later left the band and formed Super Wanyika. In 1988 Shabani left the group to join Everest Kings Band led by Abdul Muyonga, but eventually rejoined Les Wanyika.

One of their hits was "Pamela", which was written by Shabani and dedicated to his wife Pamela Akinyi Omari. The song is to be distinguished from another song titled "Pamela" that was recorded by Simba Wanyika before Shabani left it to form Les Wanyika. This song is also dedicated to Pamela Akinyi. Pamela passed away on 8th August 2025.

In 2006 it was reported that the group would be reformed with a new line-up.

The band's current leaders are original founding members Sijali Salum Zuwa and Tommy Malanga.

The group is popular in Kenya.

== See also ==
- List of Wanyika bands, lists many of the offshoots of Les Wanyika and Simba Wanyika.
