= Safari Sound Band =

Kenyan band

Safari Sound Band is a Kenyan hotel pop band formed in the late 1970s in Mombasa.

== Origins and style ==
In over twenty years of activity, they were certified platinum four times, and their recordings of Swahili classics such as "Jambo Bwana" (published with title "Jambo, Jambo"), Coconut, Lala Salama, Mombasa (ina Raha), Karibuni Kenya, Pole Pole, Mama Sofia and the popular love song Nakupenda (Wewe) are well known both locally and on the international scene . They have published a number of LP's and CDs featuring cover versions of African evergreens such as "Malaika" as well as other easy listening Swahili pop tracks. The band consists of six elements (guitar, keyboards, saxophone, bass, drums, and percussions). All the band members also sing.

The band became notable for performing at hotels along the Kenyan coast, mixing African pop, Chakacha rhythms, and jazz-influenced tunes that appealed to both local audiences and international visitors.

== Band Members ==
- Engineer – Peter Seiler
- Bongos, Vocals – Dala Hamis
- Guitar, Vocals – Mahmud Siraj
- Keyboards, Vocals – Chuli Rishad, Umar Emuroni
- Percussion – Waiyaki Swaleh
- Bass – Juma Mzingo
- Vocals – John Izungu, Susan Wanjiru
- Composer - Simon Kabwana

== Discography ==
Studio Albums

- The Best of African Songs released in 1996, originally 1984:

Track listing:

1	Jambo Jambo
2	Pole Pole
3	Nakupenda Wewe
4	Music In Africa
5	Coconut
6	Kenya Safari
7	Mombasa
8	Lala Salama
9	Karibuni Kenya
10	Kilimanjaro
11	Malaika

- African Safari Club Presents Safari Sound & Guest Star Jane Osborne released in 1986:

Track listing:

Side A	Safari Sound "Evolution"
1	Love, Peace And Happiness
2	Welcome Home
3	Music In Africa
4	Mombasa Moon
5	Fire Is Burning
6	Kilimanjaro
Side B	Safari Sound "At Home"
1	African Queen
2	Chakacha
3	Simba
4	Watoto
5	Bwanna Na Bibi Na Toto
6	Pole Pole

- African Safari Club Present African Safari Sound released in 1986:

Track Listing

1	Jambo, Jambo
2	Music In Africa
3	Coconut
4	Mombasa Moon
5	Pole Musa
6	Mombasa
7	Lala Salama
8	Karibuni Kenya
9	Kilimanjaro
10	Malaika
11	Ahsante Sana
12	Mama Sofia

- Mambo Jamboreleased in 1997:

Track listing:

1	Jambo Jambo
2	Simba
3	Kala Mashaka
4	Hinde
5	Pole Pole
6	Nakupenda Wewe
7	Chakacha
8	Binti
9	Mamake Asiya
10	Watoto
11	Mambo Jambo
12	Mama Sofia
13	Pole Musa
14	Malaika

- The Best of African Songs Vol. 2:

Track listing:

1	Hinde
2	Mpenzi
3	Pole Musa
4	Watoto
5	Jaya Simba
6	Safari Sound
7	Hongera
8	Mama Sophia (Medley)

- Lala Salama video
- Mombasa Moon released in 1999:

Track listing:

1	Love Peace & Happiness
2	Jambo Jambo
3	Chakacha
4	Simba
5	Pole Pole
6	Welcome Home
7	Kenya Safari
8	Coconut
9	Mombasa Moon
10	Malaika
11	Pole Musa
12	Lala Salama

- East Coast Dreams (1999)

Singles released under Polydor

1. Lala Salama/Kenya Safari released in 1981
2. Mama Lea Mtoto (7") released in 1984
3. Disco Bui Bui / Disco Lele Mama released in 1985
4. Pole Pole / Music In Africa released in 1985
