= Grosspool Music =

- Official logo
- Parent company: Grosspool Media
- Founded: 2013
- Founder: Phillip Nyalenda
- Distributor(s): Self Distribution
- Genre: Various
- Country of origin: Kenya
- Location: Nairobi
- Official website: https://grosspool.carrd.co/

Grosspool Music is a recording and artist services label (production, music marketing, management & distribution) based in Nairobi. As a label they have handled releases by Needah, Lion Boy and Teezeh. Grosspool supports affiliated musicians too. The company also offers label services to independent artists and labels.

== History ==
Grosspool was founded in 2013 by Phillip Nyalenda. Initially it was an online service to connect artists, producers, managers and other professionals but later due to market dynamics, the business model changed, Grosspool becoming an agency that worked with individual artists on promotion, management and marketing deals. Teezeh was the first to be signed in late 2014.The brand's slogan is "Stay Resilient" .

== Former Artists ==
1. Needah
2. Teezeh

== Releases ==
Grosspool has worked with various artists for talent management and project releases.

1. Transmission (EP) by Teezeh
2. Nikiwa Nawe (single) by Teezeh
3. Safari Mixtape (LP) by Needah
4. Cheque In Ma Hand (single) by Needah
5. Street Love (single) by Lion Boy feat. LB
6. Light Up (single) by Videz, Teezeh, Kash & Nasha Dee
7. Rembo (Single) by Permi featuring permi Boi

== Awards ==
1. Best Hip Hop music (2013 Vybez Awards) K- Town(single) Needah >>Won
2. Best Female Artist (2014 Vybez Awards) - Needah >>Won
3. Best Hip Hop Song (2015 Vybez Awards) Drizzling Sorrow(single) Needah >>Won

Needah has bagged other nominations too.
