= Murfy's fLaw =

Kenyan alternative rock band

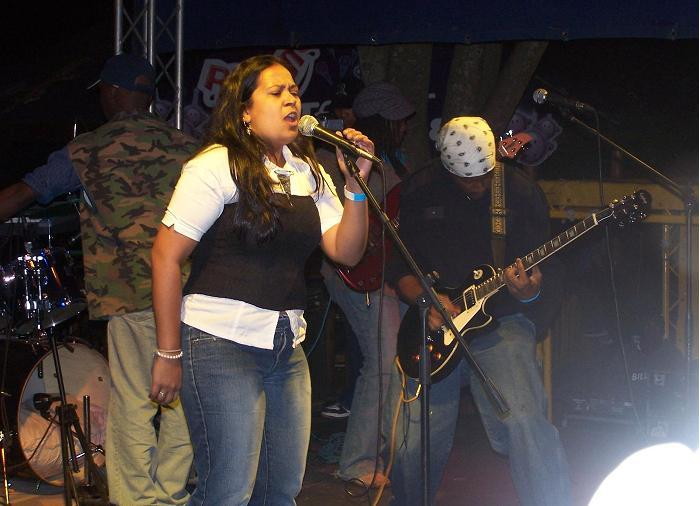
- Murfy's fLaw Rocktoberfest October 2008: Reema, Jozie, No.9

Background information
- Origin: Nairobi, Kenya
- Genres: Rock, Alternative Rock
- Years active: 2007–present
- Labels: Murfy's fLaw
- Members: Reema (Vocals); No 9 (Lead Guitar/ Vocals); Mukasa (Rhythm Guitar); Jojo (Keyboards/ Vocals); Jozie (Bass); Vicky (Drums/ Vocals)
- Past members: Punky Monkey
- Website: murfysflaw.com

Murfy's fLaw is a Kenyan alternative rock band formed in Nairobi, Kenya, in 2007.

== History ==
It is a 6-piece band that is unique in Kenya in its chosen genre of performed music.

Murfy's fLaw is also unique in its Multi-cultural mix of peoples from different tribes and countries. The band's musical style is experimental alternative rock which fuses alt-rock sounds with elements from Kiswahili folk and Hindi music.

On November 21, 2008, Murfy's fLaW released their début album "Makosa". The album has an underlying feminist context with the band made up predominantly of female musicians performing in a genre typically dominated by men. The word ‘Makosa’ is Kiswahili for “the evil that men do”.

On November 11, 2011, they released their second album, "Hello Light".

On September 19,2019, Murfy's fLaW released their third album, "̶N̶a̶t̶a̶k̶a̶ Sitaki".

The band frequently performs every first Friday at an Ethiopian restaurant called Dass. They also have been known to have various random shows in Nairobi city.

== Makosa ==
Murfy's fLaw released their album, Makosa on 21 October 2008. The band explored various media to produce their music videos such as 2D animation for "Your Friend".

== Discography ==
- Makosa (2008)
- Hello Light (2011)
- Nataka Sitaki (2019)

== Awards and nominations ==
Murfy’s fLaW received three nominations for the inaugural Heavy and the Beast Awards in 2019, and won one. Singer, Reema Doshi, was nominated for Best Female Artist, and their song, “Abso-bloomin-lutely” was nominated for Best Music Video. The band won an award in the Best Live Performance category.
