= Them Mushrooms =

Musical band

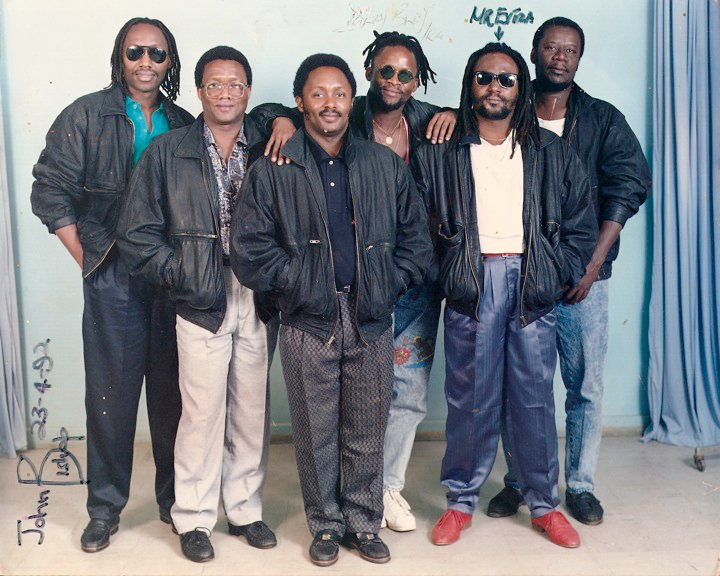

Background information
- Origin: Nairobi, Kenya
- Genres: Pop; Benga music; reggae
- Years active: 1982–present

Them Mushrooms is a musical band from Kenya, playing mostly Chakacha, some Benga as well as some reggae. They are most famous for the Swahili 1982 song "Jambo Bwana". The band is composed of Teddy Kalanda, Henry Ndenge Saha and Ben Mutwiwa. They mainly do covers of previously written hit songs.

In 2009 bandleader John Katana was among four pioneering Kenyan artists given Head of State Commendation awards by president Mwai Kibaki. Musician John Nzenze was among the others.

== History ==
The group was founded in 1969 as Avenida Success. The original line-up consisted of Harrison brothers Teddy Kalanda, Billy Sarro, George Zirro, John Katana, Pius Plato Chitianda "Jibaba" and Pritt Nyale. A fifth Harrison brother, Dennis Kalume, joined two years later.

In 1972 the group was renamed Them Mushrooms, from the mystical magic mushroom species, that grow wildly across the depths of Africa's rain forests. They are seen as East Africa's premier band.

This group rose to fame with a distinct blend of Taarab and Sega/Benga folk music, before taking to Chakacha and spicing it up with rap and hip-hop beats. African influences included Franco of TPOK Jazz from Congo, Egypt 80 and Manu Dibango of Cameroon while in the international front it was Otis Redding, James Brown, Wilson Pickett, Kool and the Gang, Earth, Wind and Fire, and also Madonna.

The group originally played the beach hotel circuit in Mombasa until 1986, with its coastal music influences. They moved to Nairobi the year after. The group almost disbanded in 1992 when its drummer and songwriter Dennis Kalume died and George Zirro left the band to pursue a solo career. In 2002 the band was renamed Uyoga, but the name "Them Mushrooms" has since been taken back.

One of the most famous of their songs is "Jambo Bwana" (Hello, mister in Swahili), released in 1982 and often referred to as "Hakuna Matata" from refrain lines. Penned by Teddy Kalanda, the band leader, this song went on to sell 30,000 copies. "Jambo Bwana", borrowed from a popular Kenyan folk song of the same name, was an instant hit in the 1980s.

One of their other hits, Ndogo Ndogo, was adapted as the soundtrack of the Paul Singh-produced Kiswahili language film titled Mahari.

== Discography ==
Them Mushroom have released several albums:

- Jambo Bwana (1980) (Rocking in Africa / Greetings and Respect / Nyimbo Za Daktari / Madd Maddo Maddest / Lady / Oh Twaila / Jambo Bwana / Was 1st Lost Mama / What You See / Comment Allez-Vous / Come Stare / John Lennon / Ronja / Wanamziki Si Wakora)
- Mama Africa (1983)
- New Horizons (1985)
- At the Carnivore (1987)
- Going Places (1988)
- Almost There (1989)
- Where We Belong (1990)
- Zilizopendwa 91 (1991)
- Zilizopendwa 92 (1992)
- Kazi Ni Kazi (1996)
- Ni Hiyo (1998)
- Oh! Twalia (1998)
- Jambo Bwana (1999)
- Songs from Kenya (2000) (Jambo Bwana / Mushroom Soup / Wazee Wakumbuke / Wazee Wakatke / Zilizo Pendwa / Za Kale Zipo / Malaika / Wamsheba Wamsheba / Si Nguo / Kama Zamani / Hapo Kale)
- Zilizopendwa 2000 (2000)
- Uyoga (2004)
