= 8th Special Operations Squadron =

Squadron of the United States Air Force

- 8th Special Operations Squadron patch
- Active: 1917–present
- Country: United States
- Branch: United States Air Force
- Role: Special Operations
- Size: Squadron
- Part of: Air Force Special Operations Command
- Garrison/HQ: Hurlburt Field, Florida
- Nickname: Blackbirds
- Engagements: World War I; World War II; Korean War; Vietnam War; Operation Eagle Claw; Operation Urgent Fury; Operation Just Cause; Operation Desert Shield; Operation Desert Storm; Operation Provide Promise; Operation Deny Flight; Operation Assured Response; Operation Southern Watch; Operation Enduring Freedom; Operation Iraqi Freedom
- Decorations: Distinguished Unit Citation Presidential Unit Citation Gallant Unit Citation Air Force Outstanding Unit Award with Combat "V" Device; Air Force Outstanding Unit Award Philippine Presidential Unit Citation Korean Presidential Unit Citation Republic of Vietnam Gallantry Cross with Palm

Commanders
- Notable commanders: General George C. Kenney

Insignia
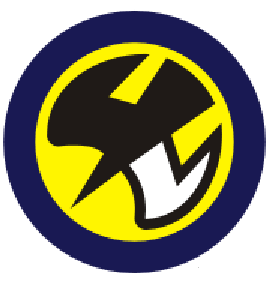
- 8th Special Operations Squadron emblem (approved 18 June 1997)

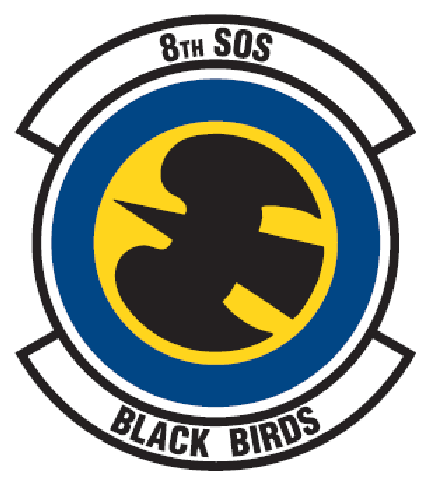
- 8th Special Operations Squadron emblem (approved 15 June 1993)

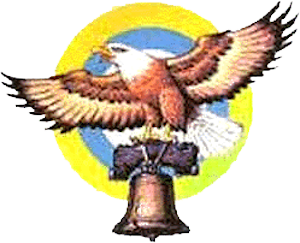
- 8th Bombardment Squadron emblem (approved 21 June 1954)

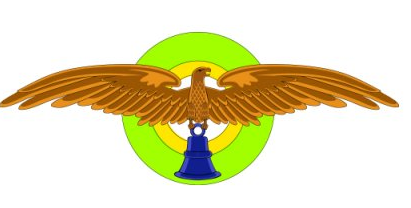
- 8th Attack Squadron emblem (approved 14 February 1924)

The 8th Special Operations Squadron is a squadron of the United States Air Force. It is assigned to the 1st Special Operations Wing, Air Force Special Operations Command, stationed at Hurlburt Field, Florida. The squadron is equipped with the Bell Boeing CV-22 Osprey in support of special operations.

The 8th is one of the oldest units in the United States Air Force, being organized as the 8th Aero Squadron on 21 June 1917 at Camp Kelly, Texas. The squadron deployed to France and fought on the Western Front during World War I, equipped with United States-built Dayton-Wright DH-4, as reconnaissance aircraft.

During World War II, the squadron fought in the Southwest Pacific Area with Fifth Air Force as an attack and later North American B-25 Mitchell medium bomber squadron. During the Cold War, it fought in the Korean War with Douglas B-26 Invader medium bombers and Vietnam War as a Martin B-57 Canberra medium bomber and later as an air commando squadron with Cessna A-37 Dragonfly counter-insurgency aircraft.

== Mission ==
The primary mission of the squadron is insertion, extraction, and resupply of unconventional warfare forces and equipment into hostile or enemy-controlled territory using airland or airdrop procedures.

== History ==
The 8th Special Operations Squadron can trace its history to 21 June 1917 when the 8th Aero Squadron was organized at Kelly Field, Texas. The squadron has an unbroken history of over 95 years of service to the United States.

=== World War I ===
The 8th Aero Squadron was drawn from enlisted personnel of the 2d Company I, Provisional Aviation Camp, Camp Kelly, Texas. After a short period of training at Kelly, the squadron boarded a train and moved to Selfridge Field, Michigan, on 5 July. Together with the 9th Aero Squadron, the 8th helped to construct the new flying field. For three and one-half months, the 8th Aero Squadron was engaged in training. Flight cadets, aviation mechanics, fitters and riggers learned their basic skills. At Selfridge, the flight cadets completed primary aviation flight training, including soloing on Curtiss JN-4 "Jenny" trainers.

Serving in France on the Western Front, the 8th Aero Squadron served as a corps observation (reconnaissance) squadron. It arrived at the front at Ourches Aerodrome on 31 July 1918 and was assigned to the IV Corps Observation Group, First Army on 14 August. The squadron was engaged in operations in the Toul Sector, Chateau Thierry offensive, Battle of Saint-Mihiel and the Meuse-Argonne Offensives. It suffered twelve casualties, consisting of four killed and eight airmen taken prisoner.

The squadron returned to the United States on 3 May 1919, and largely demobilized at Mitchel Field, New York, and returned to civilian life. A small cadre of the unit remained in the Air Service, and were assigned to Kelly Field, Texas.

=== Intra-War period ===
Upon its arrival at Kelly Field, the squadron was reorganized to a peacetime strength manning of two flights. At Kelly, the 8th, along with the 12th, 13th and 90th Aero Squadrons were formed into the Army Surveillance Group on 1 July 1919. The group was re-designated the 3d Attack Group on 2 July 1921.

==== Mexican Border patrol ====
see also: United States Army Border Air Patrol

The mission of the Army Surveillance Group was to carry out observation overflights along the Mexican Border. During this period, Mexico was enduring a period of revolution and unrest, which led to border violations and the deaths of American citizens. New personnel for the squadron were transferred from Rockwell Field, California, and the squadron was equipped with new surplus Dayton-Wright DH-4 aircraft. After being manned and equipped, the squadron was then divided into two flights: one at Kelly Field and "A" Flight being sent to McAllen, Texas, along the Rio Grande in South Texas.

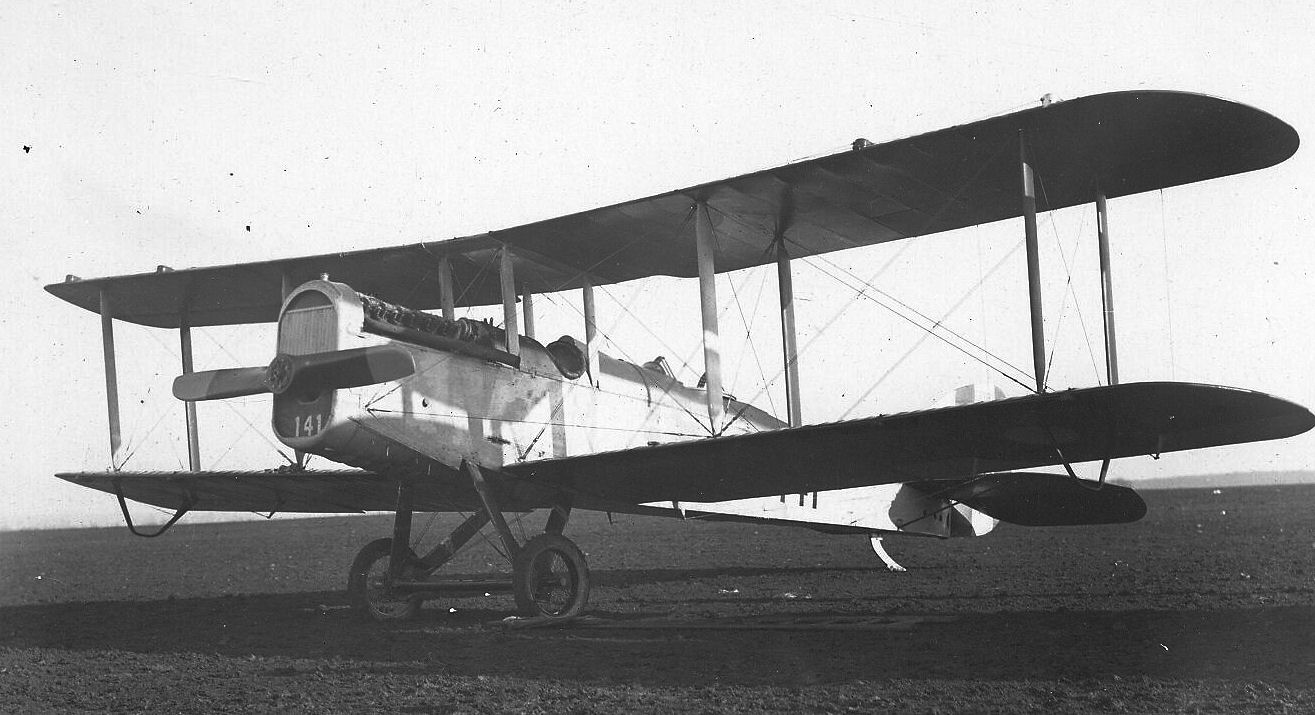
An 8th Surveillance Squadron Dayton-Wright DH-4. The DH-4 was the mainstay of the Army Air Service throughout the 1920s.

At McAllen, an airfield had to be established. Land was first cleared by a construction squadron and by 18 August, they had succeeded in clearing off enough cactus and mesquite for a landing strip that was suitable for safe landings. Also, the engineers had put up seven tent hangars and several framed tent structures for the personnel. The first border reconnaissance flight was made by this flight of the Squadron on 29 July and as fast as planes could be assembled at Kelly Field and flown to the new airfield, border patrol work started.

Squadron headquarters and Flight B remained at Kelly Field until 13 August 1919, when Flight B left for Laredo, Texas, and Headquarters, consisting of two officers and 17 men, joined Flight A at McAllen. B Flight consisted of six DH-4s which had been assembled at Kelly Field and were flown down to Laredo when the flight was ready to operate. Work of building a permanent camp at both flight stations was started at once, after their arrival at their respective stations. Seven buildings were erected at McAllen and about the same number was erected at Laredo. During March 1920, new DH-4B's, were ferried down to McAllen and Laredo by Kelly Field pilots. They were specially good for observation and liaison purposes since the new arrangements of cockpits put the pilot and observer close together.

Still flying the DH-4, the squadron returned to Kelly Field on 20 June 1921, when the situation in Mexico stabilized. All personnel and material was ordered returned from Laredo and McAllen to Kelly Field, with the exception of three caretakers at each station which proceeded to close down the airfields.

==== 8th Squadron (Attack) ====
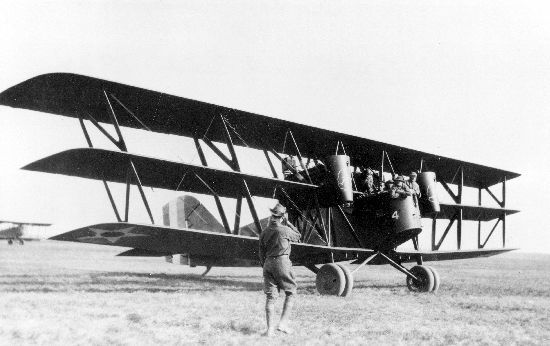
Boeing GA-1

Upon their return to Kelly Field, both flights of the squadron were consolidated on 2 July 1921 and the last personnel from both detachments returned. The squadron was redesignated as the 8th Attack Squadron and received a Boeing GA-1 bi-motored triplane. It was designed especially to strafe ground troops while remaining immune to attack from the ground as well as from other enemy aircraft. However, it was found during service testing that it was so well armored its five-ton weight proved excessive.

On 26 May 1922, a long-distance one-man non-stop record was set when Lt. Crocker when he made a non-stop flight from the Mexican Gulf Coast to the Canada–US Border, an approximate distance of 1200 miles, to demonstrate the mobility of the Air Service. The course was from Ellington Field, Texas to the waters of the Gulf of Mexico thence to the Canada–US border just below Detroit, Michigan, landing at Selfridge Field. This distance was greater than from some other cities along the Gulf, but since a large field was necessary for the heavily laden plane to take off, Ellington Field was selected as the starting point. The plane used was a special built DH-4 and designated as DH-4B1S. The main tank had a gas capacity of 240 gallons and the reserve 28 gallons, with a 24-gallon tank for oil. Taking off from Ellington, he landed at Selfridge after 11 hours and 55 minutes in the air.

In June 1922, the squadron provided flood relief in the lower Rio Grande Valley. A commendable piece of work was done by Lt. Selzer in July 1922, in connection with the Rio Grande flood at McAllen Field, Texas, in carrying mail to towns without the usual rail connections, assisting in locating marooned parties caught by the rapid rising waters of the Rio Grande River, and in cooperating with the other military authorities of that station during the critical time.

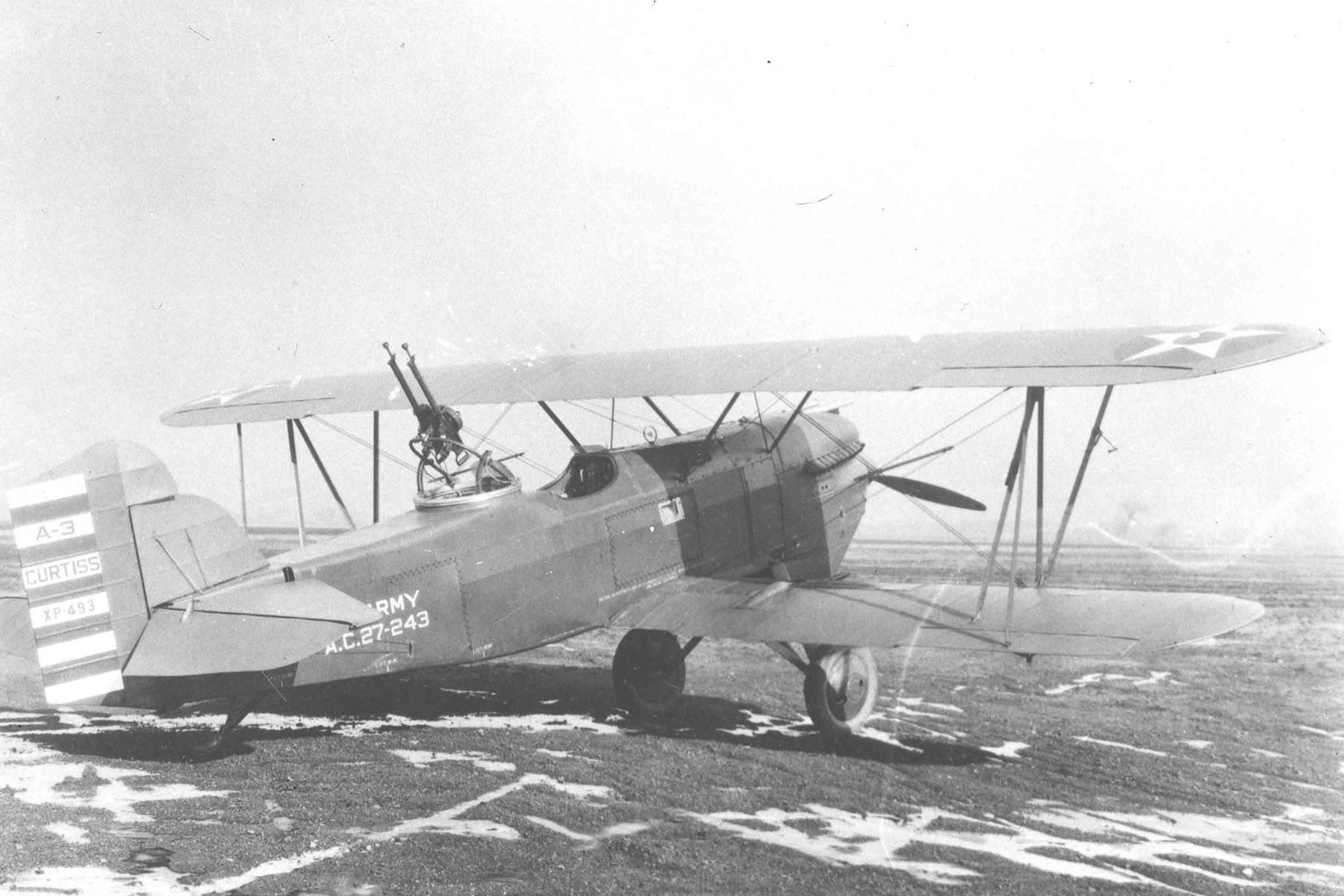
Curtiss A-3 Falcon (SN 27-243)

On 28 June 1926 the squadron moved from Kelly Field to Fort Crockett in Galveston, Texas. The organization's planes with necessary personnel were flown, in advance. The remaining troops were convoyed by truck. During it stay at Fort Crockett, the group was called on often during its nine-year stay at Fort Crocket to participate in air maneuvers, demonstrations and air races.

During this time the squadron flew many types of aircraft. These aircraft included Douglas O-2; Curtiss A-3 Falcon; Curtiss A-12 Shrike (including Curtiss A-8s) Thomas-Morse O-19s; and the Northrop A-17 Nomads. The squadron participated in a great amount of work in connection with experiment, practice and development of aviation in general and attack aviation in particular. It progressed from the DH-4B type aircraft to the A-12, which was the immediate forerunner of the Northrop A-17 and A-17A. At Fort Crockett the squadron began flying the Curtis A-3 Falcon in 1926. It boasted four forward-firing .30-caliber machine guns and another two on a flexible mount in the rear cockpit. Powered by a 430-horsepower engine, the Falcon could carry 200 pounds of bombs attached to wing racks. Although carrying a lighter bomb load, the A-3 proved better in the attack role than the DH-4. The A-3B replaced the A-3. In 1934 the aircraft would be used to carry mail.

The 3d Attack Group resumed border patrols briefly again in 1929, after unrest erupted in Mexico. It deployed 18 of its aircraft on patrol along the Mexican border with Arizona in early April. The patrols lasted until early May when the situation in Mexico stabilized. After the border patrols ended, the squadron resumed its training activities at Fort Crockett.

On 5 January 1932 the organization received its first A-12 attack airplane from the Curtis factory. By the last of January the Squadron had ten A-12s and four A-3Bs assigned. By late 1932, the squadron had upgraded to the Curtis A-8 Shrike. The low-wing monoplane represented the rapid advance in aircraft technology being achieved despite the economic difficulties of the Great Depression. It carried 400 pounds of bombs and was armed with five .30-caliber machine guns. The 8th received the A-12 Shrike, an improved version of the A-8, the next year.

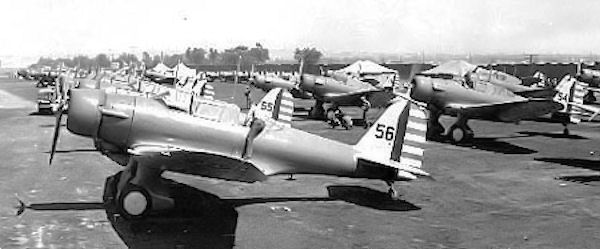
8th Attack Squadron – Northrop A-17As, 1936

On 12 February 1934, in compliance with Executive Order 6591, dated 9 February 1934, the organization began preparation for duty in connection with carrying the air mail. The Air Corps agreed to carry the US mail following a government dispute with the commercial carriers. When the Air Corps started to carry the mail in 1934 the 8th was one of the first Squadrons selected to be used in this capacity. On 15 May, the Army terminated its connection with the carrying of the mail and personnel and planes began returning to station and the squadron returned to its routine duties.

On 1 March 1935 the squadron moved by train with the Group to Barksdale Field, Louisiana at which time it became a part of General Headquarters Air Force and became a service test organization. The squadron went immediately into a strenuous training period which included formation flying, attack and aerial gunnery, bombing, night flying and many navigation missions. The squadron continued in this capacity until October 1940 and during this period participated in all the major field exercises and tactical maneuvers throughout the country.

In 1937, the squadron received 13 Curtis A-18 Shrikes. This two-engine attack plane represented a technological advance. It carried 20 fragmentation bombs in the fuselage and up to four 100-pound bombs under its wings. Four .30-caliber machine guns mounted in the nose provided concentrated fire for strafing ground targets. It performed well, winning the Harmon Trophy for gunnery and bombing accuracy during its first year of operations.

==== 8th Bombardment Squadron ====
The Army redesignated the 8th Squadron as the 8th Bombardment Squadron (Light) on 15 September 1939. In September 1939, the Squadron received the Douglas B-18A Bolo. It was a Douglas light Bomber powered by twin-engined Wright Cyclones. On 31 January 1940, the squadron was split in half, both officers and enlisted men leaving to form the 15th Bomb Squadron of the 27th Bomb Group at Barksdele Field, Louisiana.

3d Bombardment Group Douglas B-18A Bolo

On 6 October 1940, the squadron received orders to pack supplies and equipment for a change of station to Savannah, Georgia. One officer and 100 enlisted men departed from Barksdale Field on troop train, while 11 officers and 54 enlisted men departed by privately owned vehicles. The men by troop train arrived at Savannah on 8 October and set up at the Municipal Airport. The remainder of the personnel arrived on 19 October and the Squadron began ferrying aircraft to the National Guard Armory. By 20 October, equipment was set up and operations begun. The airfield was renamed Savannah Air Base when Air Corps units took over its operation.

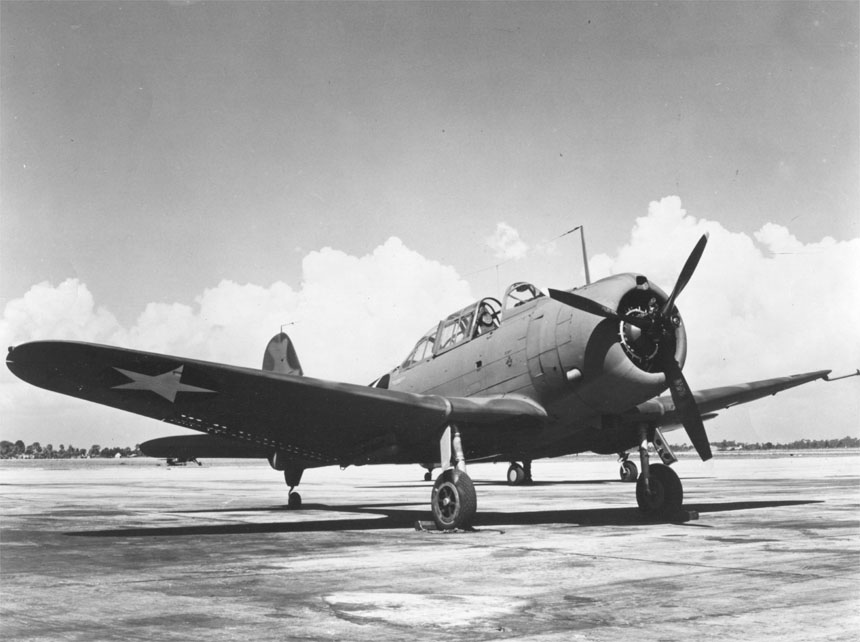
Douglas A-24 Banshee

The 8th continued in this training capacity until October 1940 and during this period participated in all major field exercises and tactical maneuvers throughout the country. The 3d Bombardment Group spent its time at Savannah flying antisubmarine patrols and practicing low-level attacks against shipping off the Atlantic Coast. At Savannah, the squadron converted to the Douglas A-20A Havoc. The 8th was the first USAAF squadron to receive the new aircraft, which was a low- and medium-altitude attack bomber designed to provide close air support to infantry forces. The A-20, which the group would fly during World War II, represented a considerable technological advance. The A-20A carried 1,100 pounds of bombs and was armed with four 30-caliber nose-mounted machine guns and another five in turrets.

The squadron was also assigned a small number of Douglas A-24 Banshee dive bombers, which was the Army's version of the Navy SBD Dauntless carrier-based dive bomber. It was almost identical to its Navy counterpart, and represented the Army's method of playing catch-up to the Luftwaffe, whose Junkers Ju 87 Stuka dive bombers during the offensives against Poland, Norway, Denmark, Belgium, the Netherlands and France at the beginning of the Second World War sparked a renewed interest in dive bombing on the part of the Air Corps.

=== World War II ===
After the Japanese attack on Pearl Harbor, the 3d Bombardment Group prepared for deployment to the Pacific Theater. The squadron's A-20A Havocs were transferred to other units, and the 8th Bomb Squadron was ordered to deploy to Australia, equipped with A-24 Banshee dive bombers. Acting on secret orders the squadron moved to California. and shortly thereafter boarded the USAT Ancon on 31 January 1942 bound for Australia. They arrived in Brisbane, Queensland, Australia on 25 February 1942 as the first U.S. troops to reach Australia.

==== Operations from Australia ====
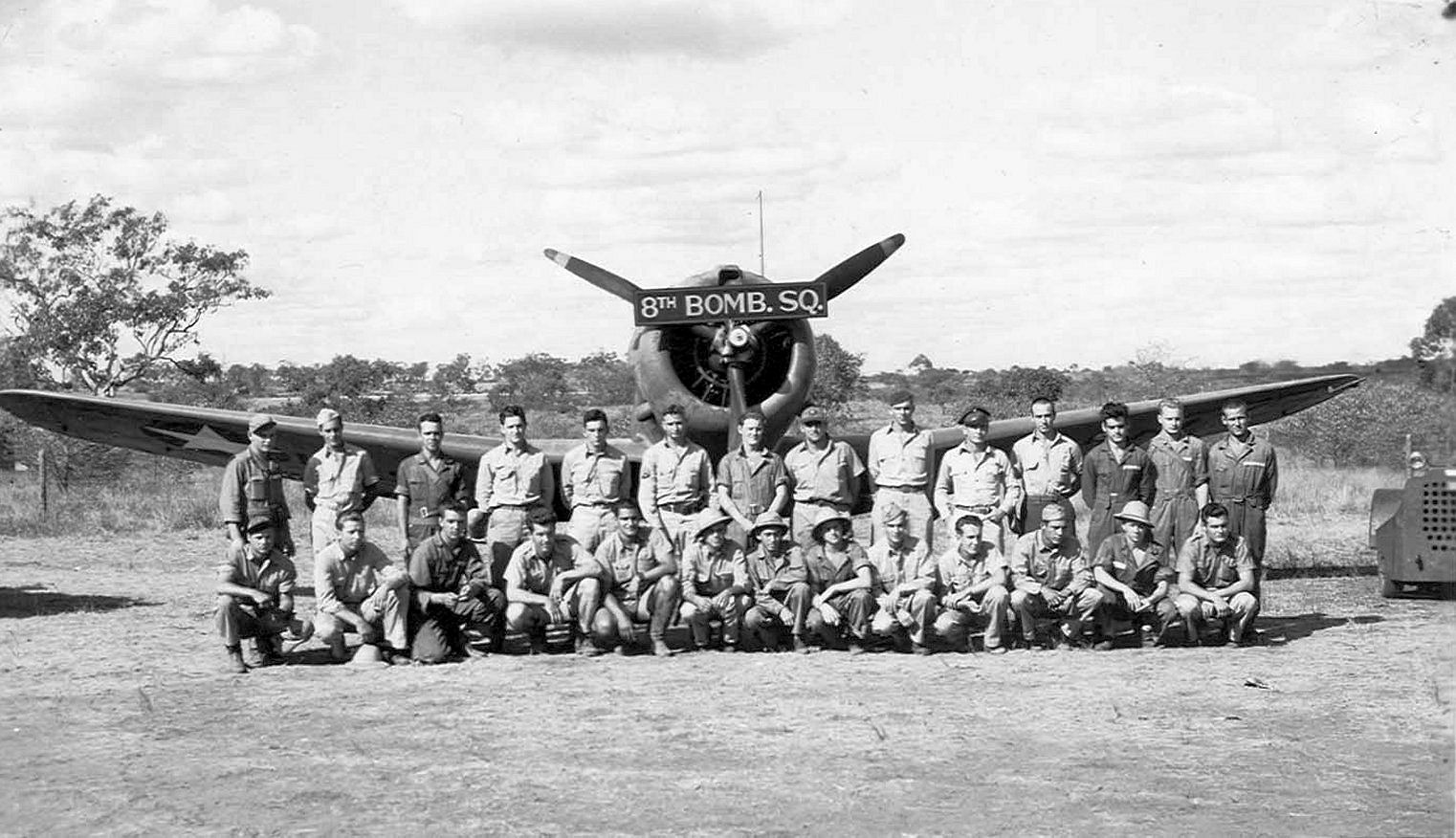
8th Bombardment Squadron posing with an A-24 Banshee Dive Bomber – Breddan Airfield, Charters Towers, Australia, March 1942.

Upon the squadron's arrival in Brisbane, its aircraft had not yet arrived. The ground crews were pressed into service as ground crews for the 19th Bombardment Group's Boeing B-17F Flying Fortresses. Since the 3d Group had no aircraft available and additional training was necessary, it did not begin operations immediately. On 6 March, the squadron moved to Charters Towers, where an airfield and a camp were hurriedly built (Breddan Airfield) while the aircrews trained with their A-24 dive bombers. On 31 March, the air echelon flew north to Port Moresby, New Guinea and the 8th was again at war. On 1 April 1942 the 3d Group flew its first combat mission of World War II. Six A-24s were headed for Japanese Lae Airfield in eastern New Guinea. Lae was socked in by weather so they diverted to Salamaua and attacked Japanese forces occupying the town. They dropped 5 bombs in their first combat mission since November 1918.

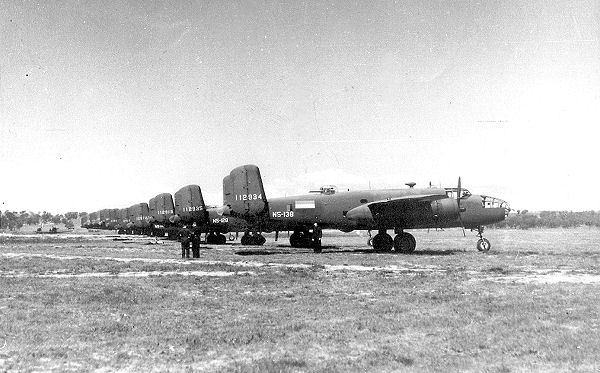
Netherlands East Indies AF B-25C Mitchells, Breddan Airfield, Charters Towers, Australia, March 1942. Note Netherlands flag insignia on fuselage. N5-138 (41-12934) in foreground

Combat missions from Charters Towers were conducted by staging through Kila Kila Airfield (also known as 3-Mile Drome), near Port Moresby. Planes would be flown by pilots, accompanied by gunners, from Charters Towers to Kila Kila where they would be refueled, armed, and then fly on to their targets. An air echelon consisting of personnel from engineering, armament, communication, mess and operations sections would travel by boat from Townsville, on the northeastern coast of Queensland to Port Moresby. Members of the air echelon would remain at Kila Kila from two weeks to three months at a time. All other men in the squadron stayed at Charters Towers.

While at Charters Towers the squadron received some North American B-25C Mitchell medium bombers during the last week of March that had been ordered by the Netherlands East Indies Air Force before the war. There were 12 of them that were flown by Air Transport Command to Australia sitting idle as the Netherlands East Indies had surrendered to the Japanese. These aircraft were immediately "requisitioned" by the USAAF in the desperate attempt to halt the Japanese advance toward Port Moresby. It was agreed that the Dutch government would be credited accordingly, or else the planes would be replaced on a one-to-one basis by later deliveries. The 8th flew the B-25s primarily against harbors and for barge hunting, but also for weather reconnaissance or antisubmarine searches. The crews initially formed to fly the B-25s consisted of personnel that for the most part had previous experience on Martin B-10 bombers.

==== Battle of New Guinea ====
===== Port Moresby =====
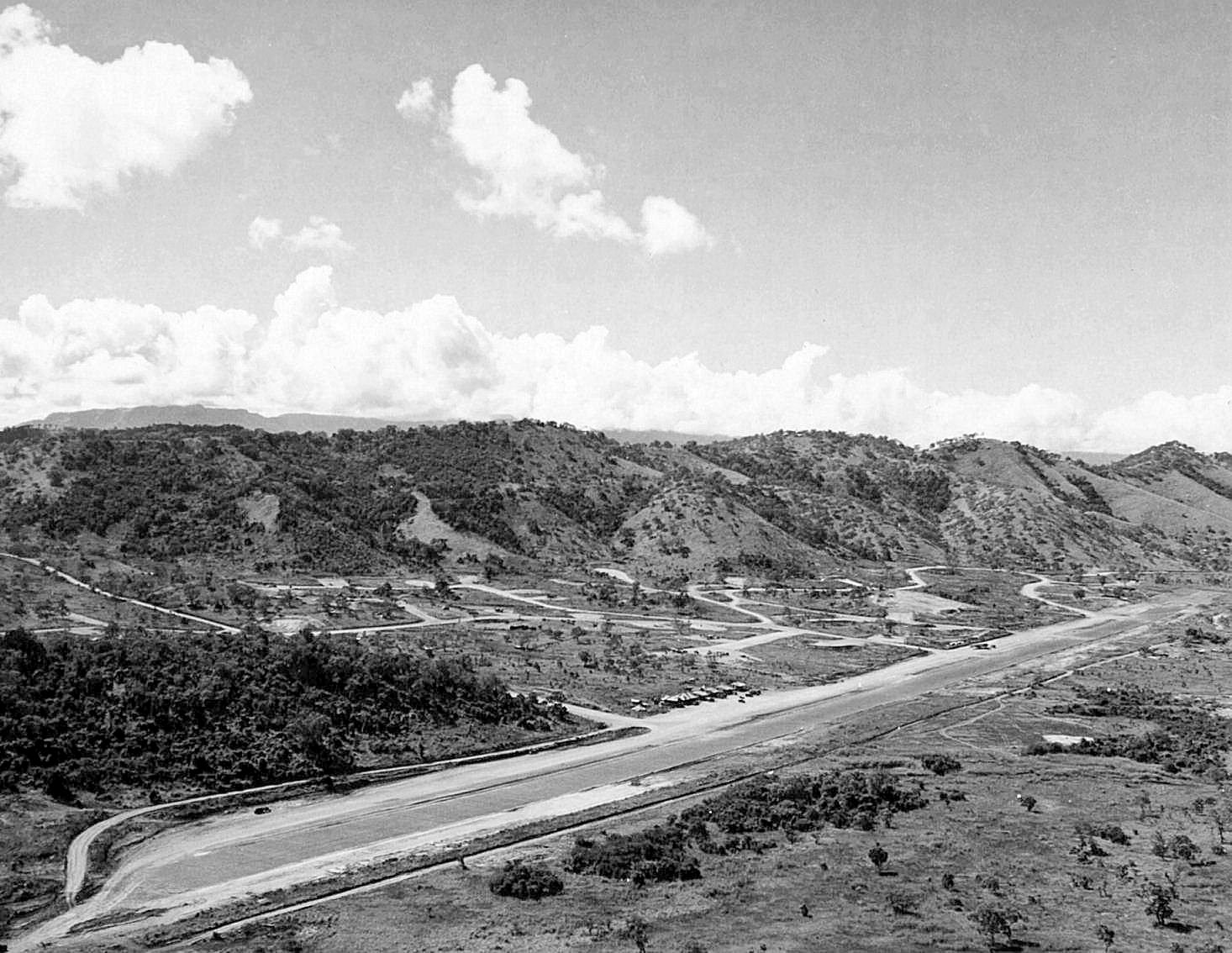
Kila Kila Airfield (also known as 3-Mile Drome), near Port Moresby, New Guinea.

The squadron moved to Jackson Airfield (7 Mile Drome), Port Moresby, New Guinea on 31 March 1942 after the Japanese advance was thwarted. Thirteen A-24s left Charters Towers for Port Moresby via Cooktown Airport, Queensland. At Cooktown, three turned back because of excessive oil consumption; two became mired in the mud. These five all returned to Charters Towers within 48 hours. The other eight made the 430-mile over-water flight to Port Moresby. They landed at 7 Mile Drome at 21:15. During the period from 21 April 21 to 5 May, constant changes in strength of enlisted personnel were being made as men whose health was suffering from the tropical climate there returned to Charters Towers and others were called up as the situation demanded.

On 4 April 1942. Colonel Davies led the crews of twelve B-25s on an 800-mile round trip strike from Port Moresby against the Japanese at Gasmata Airfield on the southern coast of New Britain in the Solomon Islands. Because of the distance, only four 300-pound bombs could be carried. The raid caught the Japanese by surprise. The American airmen succeeded in destroying 30 Japanese aircraft on the ground. For the first time, in what had been a one-sided air war in favor of the Japanese, the Americans had inflicted heavy losses without losing any of its own men.

However, the B-25s as high level bombers were flying without escort fighters. Although better armed, they were still treated badly by swarms of Zeros. On 24 May six B-25s attacked Lae Airfield and one of them came back. Harassing missions were flown out of Jackson Airfield with the A-24s until 29 July when an eight ship convoy was spotted 50 miles north of Buna, Papua New Guinea. Five of seven A-24s that had taken off to attack the convoy were shot down by enemy fighter planes. They initially had an escort of Bell P-39 Airacobras. Somewhere over the Owen Stanley Mountains they lost their escort and decided to go in without them. Subsequently, they ran into 24 Japanese fighters over Buna. In the succeeding battle against overwhelming Mitsubishi A6M Zero odds and shattering antiaircraft fire the squadron suffered heavy losses.

It was decided that the A-24 aircraft was unsuitable for dive-bombing land combat against the Japanese. The Japanese, possessing air superiority, easily dealt with the dive-bombers and the handful of inferior fighter escorts. After losing eleven A-24s and their two-man crews, the 3d Bombardment Group called off further dive-bomber missions from Jackson Airfield. They were withdrawn from New Guinea after it was realized that they were not suited for their intended role without adequate fighter protection and they were desperately in need of adequate workshop facilities and spares backup that were unavailable.

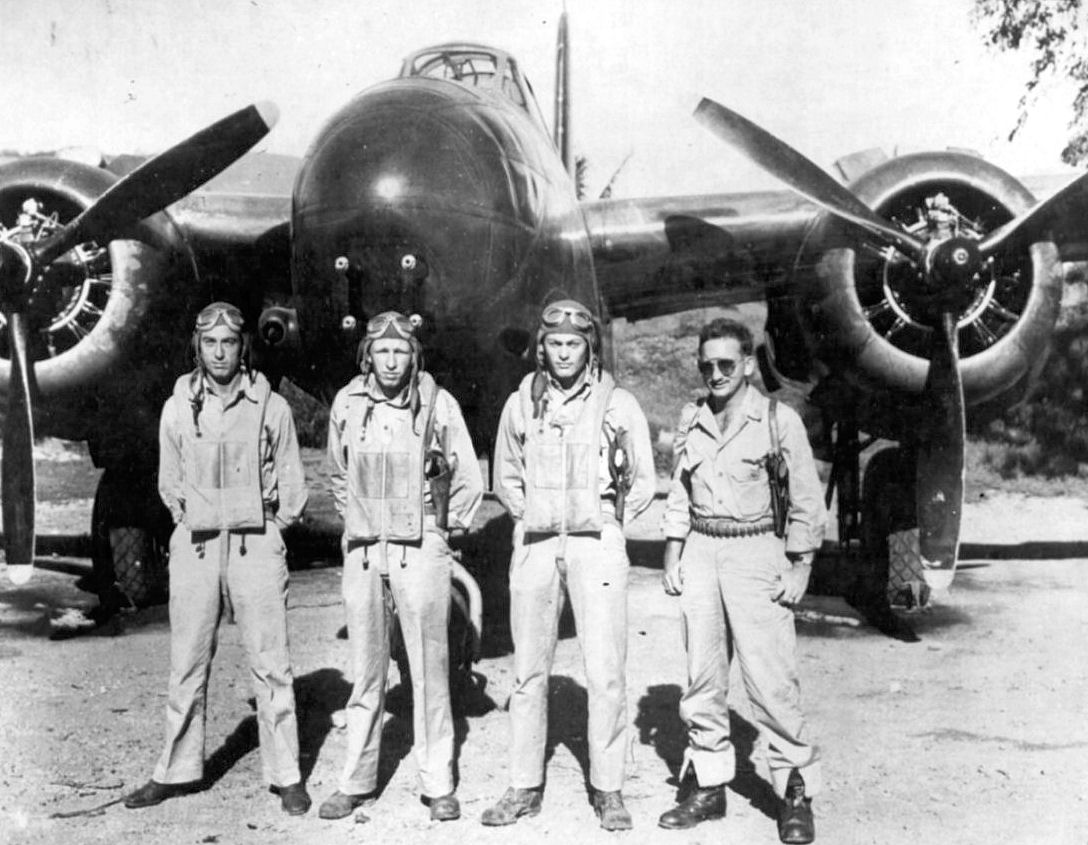
8th Bombardment Squadron crew pose in front of an A-20C Havoc, Port Moresby, New Guinea, late 1942.

In May 1942, the 8th was without any aircraft, and the men of the squadron settled down to enjoy the rumor that eventually it would receive A-20 Havocs. Capt. Galusha, acting as Commander, obtained three A-20Cs from the 89th Bombardment Squadron and proceeded to check out the crews on the A-20. Hopes were high that the squadron would be re-equipped and everyone was expecting action in the not-too distant future. Their expectations would soon turn to disillusionment as the planes did not arrive – with a negative impact to morale. The crews flew with the 89th in their two borrowed A-20s flying missions, but the unit remained without aircraft until March 1943. Despite this the 8th's crews distinguished themselves flying with the 89th Squadron.

The 8th was finally supplied with Douglas A-20C Havoc aircraft in August 1942. They returned to Australia for a short time to train in this new type of aircraft. On 28 September 1942, the Squadron was redesignated as the 8th Bombardment Squadron (Dive).

On 12 September 1942, the 8th and 89th Bombardment Squadron A-20s attacked the Japanese Buna Airfield. The Japanese, expecting an attack from 3,000 to 4,000 feet were caught off guard. The A-20 crews came in at tree top level. When the last A-20 pulled away, it left the airfield a flaming wreck with 17 Japanese aircraft destroyed. The group continued low-level attacks against ground targets in support of the Papua Campaign in their A-20s, fought from 23 July 1942 to 23 January 1943, to clear the Japanese from its lodgments at Buna and Gona on the northeast coast of New Guinea. The campaign earned them their first Distinguished Unit Citation.

===== Dobodura =====
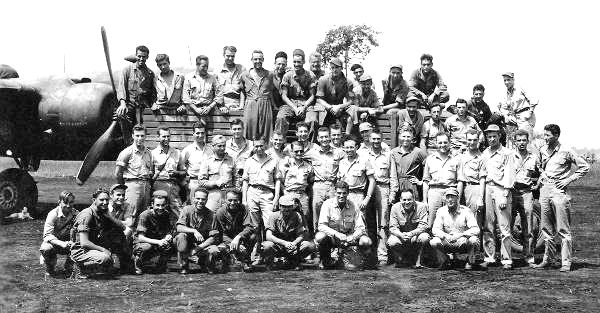
8th Bombardment Squadron with a B-25 Mitchell, Dobodura Airfield, New Guinea.

By spring of 1943, the war was shifting to the Allies advantage. On 10 April 1943 a new base was established across the Owen Stanley Mountains at Dobodura, New Guinea. In April 1943, the 8th moved alone to Dobodura and achieved the distinction of being the first bombardment unit on the northern side of the Owen-Stanley Range – in fact, the 8th Squadron and the 49th Fighter Group were the only tactical outfits on that side of the range.

At Dobodura the squadron began to receive B-25G Mitchells to replace the ones taken over from the Netherlands East Indies Air Force at Charters Towers. The B-25G was equipped with a 75-mm cannon, intended for use in anti-shipping strikes in the South Pacific. From Dobodura the 8th Squadron made one of the first raids on the Japanese Wewak Airport. The 3d Bombardment Group participated in a maximum effort against the Japanese airfields both at Wewak and Boram in mid-August, effectively neutralizing them and destroying most of the aircraft. The attacks paved the way for an airborne drop of American troops and an amphibious landing of Australian soldiers, who seized Nadzab and Lae in early September. The air attacks on the Japanese airfields and landings broke the back of any effective Japanese air capability in New Guinea and cleared the way for a further advance up the coast and the clearing of Dutch New Guinea of Japanese. The 3d Bombardment Group earned its second Distinguished Unit Citation for its support of the operation on 17 August 1943. Slowly the Japanese were pushed out of the "deep" South Pacific. Air and sea battles raged from Hollandia to Wewak. The net cost to Japanese airfields, personnel, planes and ocean-going vessels were tremendous.

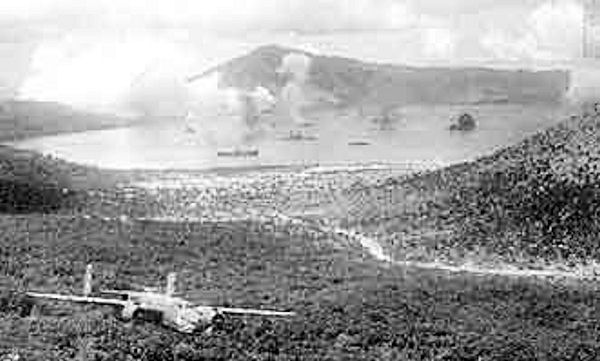
8th Bombardment Squadron attacking Rabaul with a B-25 Mitchell.

Also, the 8th began attacking the Japanese base at Rabaul, which the Japanese had turned into a fortress. It had been attacked by B-17s based in Australia early in the war, but until the establishment of an Allied base at Dobodura it was out of range of both the A-20s and B-25s. Since a direct landing assault was virtually impossible, the Americans decided on a strategy of taking Bougainville Island to the north and occupying the southern half of New Britain. Fifth Air Force received the mission of neutralizing the Japanese at Rabaul and supporting the landing to the north and south of the Japanese fortress. The 3rd Bombardment Group used its A-20s and B-25s with deadly effect in low-level attacks against Japanese ground targets and shipping. By firing the machine guns, the bomber crews forced the Japanese anti-aircraft gunners to run for cover, allowing time to drop the bombs with deadly accuracy.

===== Nadzab =====
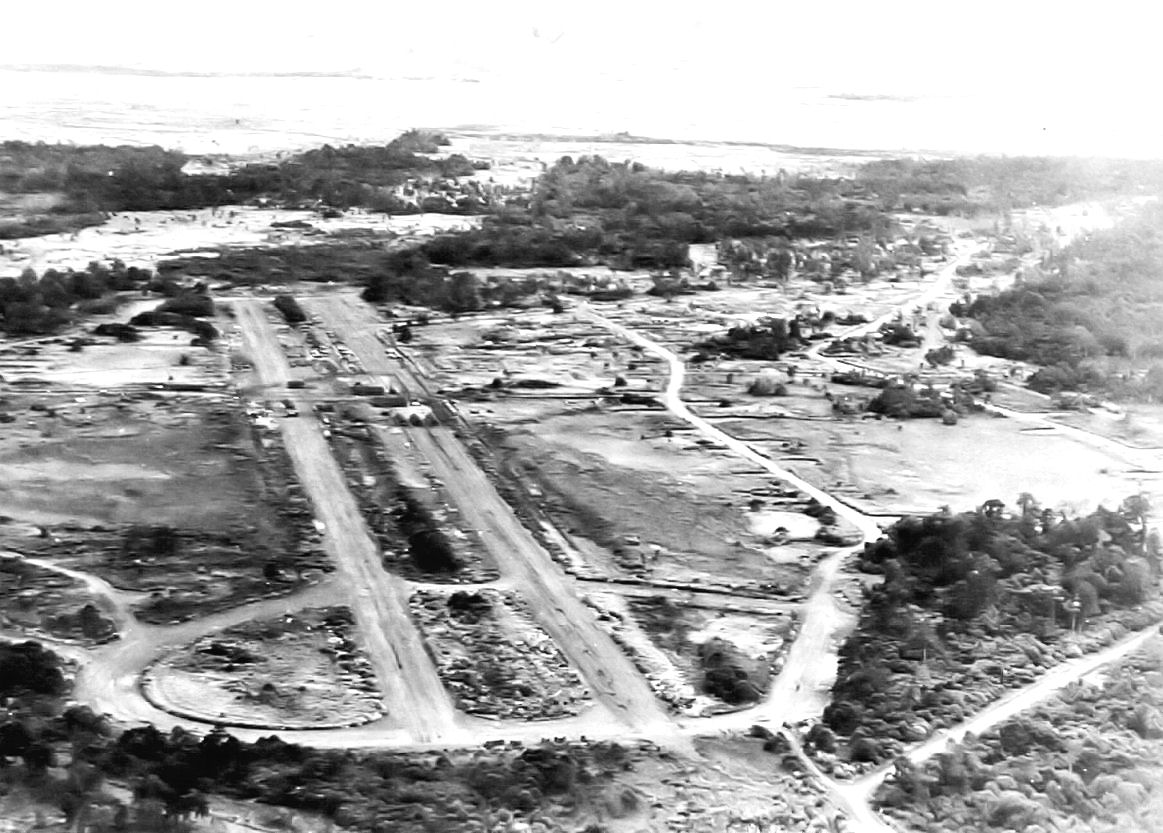
Nadzab Airfield – New Guinea

In May 1944, the same routine followed with the strafing and bombing along the coastal areas. On 5 February 1944, the unit moved to Nadzab Airfield, New Guinea. On 1 February 1944, the squadron had a strength of 40 officers and 270 enlisted men with 17 A-20Gs and 1 B-25G. This included 19 trained combat pilots and 39 trained combat gunners and photographers. The squadron continued its primary mission of interdiction. The first mission performed by the squadron during the month of April was a bombing and strafing mission against grounded aircraft and antiaircraft positions at Hollandia Airfield and Sentani Airport, in Dutch New Guinea. Fifteen A-20G aircraft took off, with all planes reaching the target, dropping 130 hundred-pound parachute demolition bombs on the target area. Bombs were seen to fall directly among 20 to 25 twin-engine unidentified airplanes off the northwest end of Hollandia Airdrome, causing many of these planes to blow up or burn fiercely. Six to eight apparently serviceable aircraft on the northeast end of Hollandia Airdrome were bombed. They are believed to have been heavily damaged or destroyed. Two twin-engine bombers were left burning on the south end of Hollandia Airdrome. Several other bombers and single-seater fighters were heavily strafed. The entire area of Sentani and Cyclops Airdromes was strafed, with many parked aircraft set afire. All the U.S. planes returned safely, but one was forced to land at Dumpu, New Guinea, damaged by anti-aircraft fire. In May 1944, the same routine followed with the strafing and bombing along the coastal areas.

===== Hollandia =====
The group moved to Hollandia Airfield on 7 May 1944 as the Japanese gave way to repeated assaults on their New Guinea strongholds. The 3d Bomb Group carried out strikes against Japanese shipping, struck airfields at low level and on 17 May, supported the landing at Wakde Island with six missions. Fires were started in fuel dumps on Wakde, causing several explosions. Two loaded barges, a fuel dump, several wooden shacks, and four or five trucks were bombed and strafed near Sarmi, causing destruction of the barges and heavy damage to the other targets.

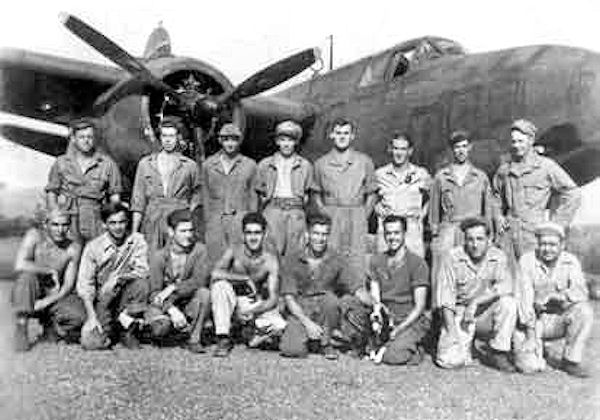
8th Bombardment Squadron aircrew with their A-20G Havoc at Hollandia Airfield, New Guinea, 1944

Shipping at Manokwari Harbor and aircraft on Kamiri Airfield on Noemfoor Island were the targets for 12 planes on 19 May was one of the most outstanding missions ever flown by the 8th Bombardment Squadron as far as damage to the enemy is concerned. The strike resulted in the sinking or damaging of seven Japanese ships from 150 to 800 tons, direct hits on a 1000- to 1500-ton ship, and damage to several smaller luggers and a power launch by misses and strafing in Manokwari Harbor. Nine of the twelve planes made strafing passes on parked aircraft on Kamiri Airfield, destroying four planes definitely and causing heavy damage to at least ten others. Many Japanese infantry of a group of approximately 100 working on the Kamiri airstrip were seen to fall after a strafing pass had been made on them. Four trucks were heavily strafed, probably rendering them completely unserviceable. Anti-aircraft Artillery fire, first at Manokwari was of all calibers, ranging from moderate to intense, but inaccurate. At Kamiri Airfield, medium and light AAA fire was received, inaccurate as to lead. One enemy Mitsubishi F1M float plane, attempted to intercept, but was shot down by a Lockheed P-38 Lightning escort about one mile west of Kamiri. All of our planes returned safely.

The 3d Bomb Group spent the rest of the year supporting ground operations as the American and Australian Armies cleaned out the last vestiges of Japanese in the New Guinea and Bismarck Archipelago areas and seized additional islands closer to the Philippines. On 20 October 1944, General Douglas MacArthur's forces landed on Leyte Island in the central Philippines. After securing the island, they established logistical bases for further operations in the Philippines.

When the landings were made upon Leyte Island in the central Philippines on 20 October, all men in the organization knew that soon their new destination would be some location in the Philippines. Rapid preparations were made in the closing days of October for a movement by water in the early part of November.

==== Philippines Campaign ====
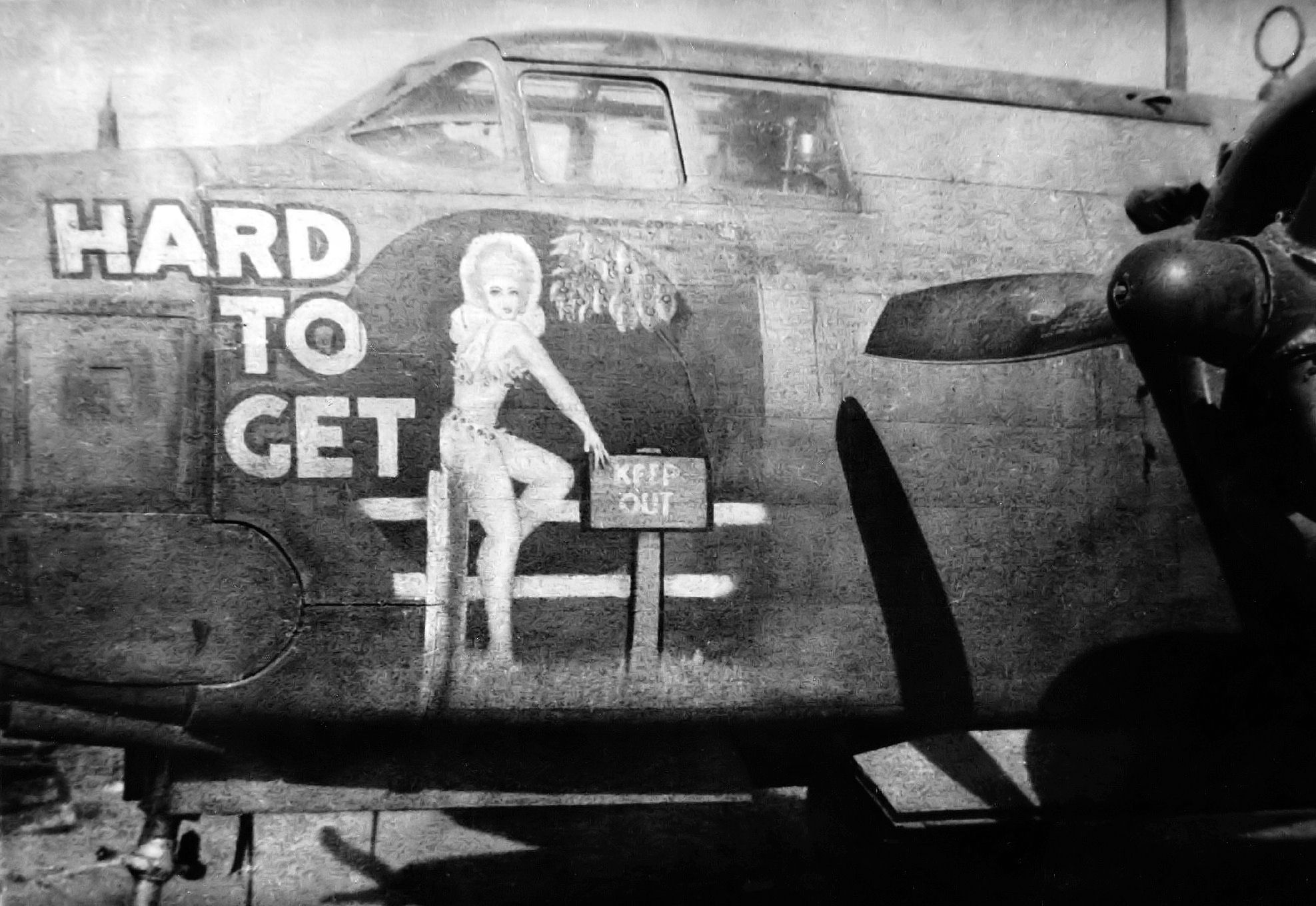
8th Bombardment Squadron – A-20G Hard to Get McGuire Field, San Jose, Mindoro, Philippines.

In November 1944, the 8th again prepared to move, splitting into advance and rear echelons. The advance echelon headed to Dulag Airfield, Leyte, Philippines on 15 November with 20 officers and 177 enlisted men. These men boarded a Landing Ship, Tank (LST) for Leyte. while 19 officers and 34 enlisted men of the rear echelon remained at Hollandia Airfield. Upon arrival at Dulag Airfield the 8th continued to fly missions against the enemy in support of ground force action. On 1 November there were 16 serviceable A-20Gs and 1 serviceable B-25J airplanes. On 30 November there were 15 serviceable A-20Gs. While based in the Philippines, the unit attacked shipping off the northwest coast of Luzon, flew missions in support of landings at Subic Bay, provided support for the recapture of Manila and Bataan, and cooperated with allied ground forces in bombing enemy held areas on Luzon and adjacent islands.

However, the biggest change for the 3d Bombardment Group in the Philippines was that, unlike in New Guinea, it was no longer was the primary ground support unit for the landing forces island hopping in the Philippines. In New Guinea, it had been constantly at the brunt of battle. In the Philippines, the 3d was moved to a support role. In November, the entire group flew only one strike mission of 10 sorties and 4.5 combat hours was flown. No strike missions were flown from Dulag Field during the entire month of December 1944. In December new higher-horsepower A-20Hs arrived to replace the battle-weary A-20Gs.

After about two months, the forward echelon of the 3d Bombardment Group moved again to Mc Guire Field, San Jose, Mindoro, Philippines on 30 December 1944. The rear remained at Hollandia, Dutch New Guinea until 23 January 1945, on which date the 8th Squadron planes left for McGuire Field, arriving on 24 January. From 24 to 31 January the entire Squadron was based at San Jose. On 1 January the Squadron had 16 serviceable A-20Hs and on 31 January there were 16 serviceable A-20Hs. The unit flew 6 missions for a total of 58 sorties. Resistance was light on the missions.

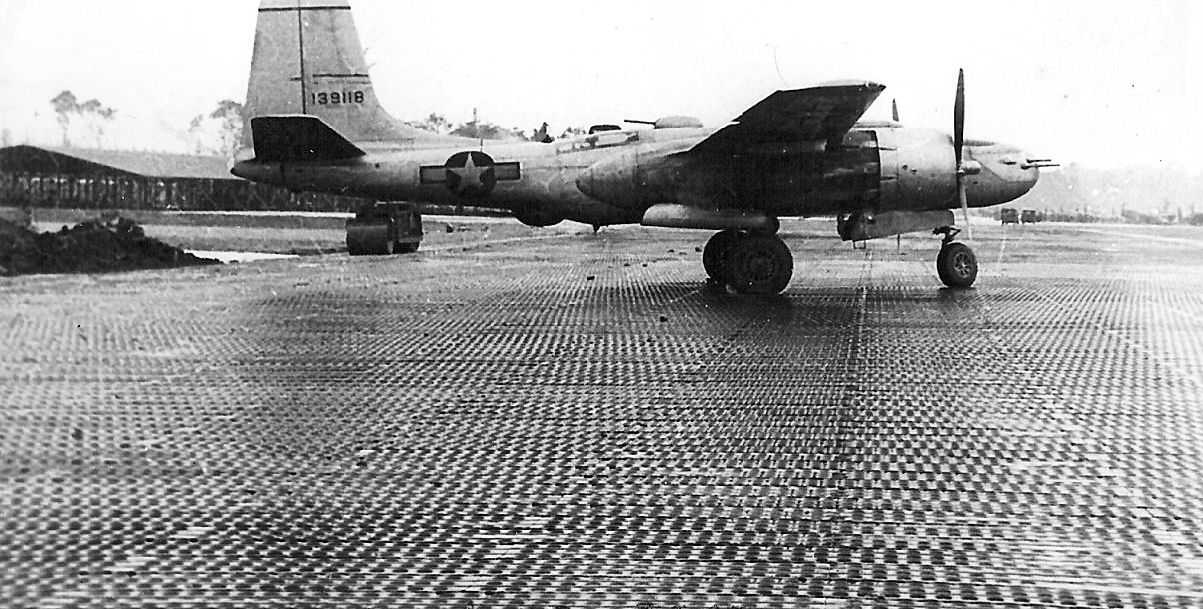

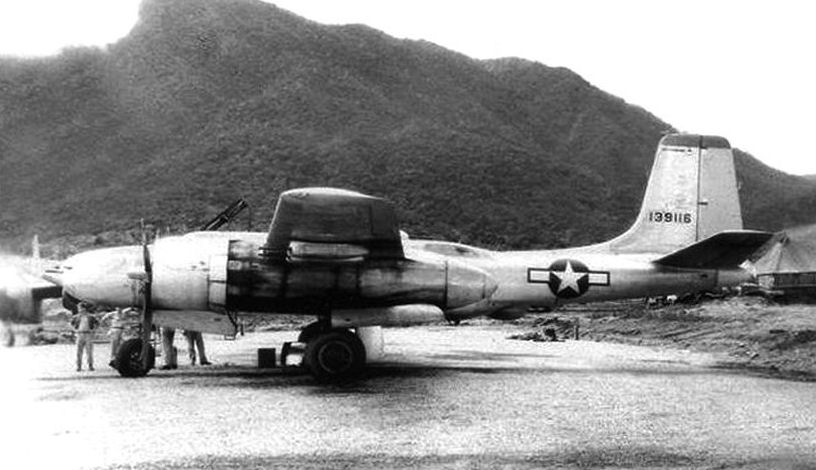
Douglas A-26B-5-DL Invader – 41-39118 8th Bombardment Squadron, Light, McGuire Field, San Jose, Mindoro, Philippines. Aircraft was one of four early models sent for combat trials in the Southwest Pacific.

On 9 January 1945, Lt Col Richard H. Ellis, commander of the 3d Bomb Group, led the first Group mission in the Philippines. The group, along with other units from Fifth Air Force, conducted a massive air strike against Japanese-held Clark Field, near Manila. Later that month, The Group supported the landing of US Forces at Subic Bay. On 9 February, Colonel Ellis led the group in a low-level attack against Japanese installations on Corregidor Island, in the beginning of a four-day attack. For the first time, aircraft of the 3d Bomb Group used aerial rockets. They later supported the American parachute assault against the small island that had been the scene of the American surrender three years earlier. As the major battles in the Philippines wound down, the Americans invaded Okinawa on 7 April 1945. The 3d Bombardment Group continued its operations in the Philippines, supporting secondary ground operations on Mindoro, Luzon and Mindanao, also attacking Japanese-held industrial targets and railways on Formosa. Army ground elements followed on the footsteps of the 8th air attacks in the Philippines and found the Japanese on the hills "dazed and killed by concussion and the remnants were easily annihilated.

At the beginning of May 1945, the group began received four early production models of the Douglas A-26B Invader for combat trials. Designed to replace the A-20 and B-25s, the Invader accommodated a pilot and a gunner. Faster, and with a longer range, it packed an impressive armament of 14 forward firing 50-caliber machine guns and could carry 2,000 pounds of bombs. In May, 23 missions for a total of 198 sorties were flown. All aircraft were flown from McGuire Field.

In June, the pace of action slowed. The squadron flew 5 missions for a total of 46 sorties. The 8th was involved in strikes against Japanese troop concentrations in the Cagayan Valley on Northern Luzon. The last organized Japanese resistance on Luzon was crushed by the end of June. Rumors of a move from McGuire Field to Okinawa in July prevailed throughout the month.

The squadron remained at McGuire Field until 25 July when the ground echelon embarked for Okinawa. The end of July found the water echelon at sea, while the air echelon remained at San Jose. The unit flew four missions for a total of twelve sorties during the entire month, with all missions in July were attacks on the Japanese targets in Formosa. Throughout July, local transition training for the A-26B was conducted with flights between McGuire Field and Clark Field on Luzon.

The first day of August 1945 found the ground echelon on the high seas en route to Okinawa, while the air echelon remained at McGuire Field on Mindoro. The ground echelon arrived on 6 August at Sobe Field, Okinawa and the air echelon arrived on 7 August. From 6 August until hostilities ceased on 12 August, the 8th was flying missions as part of a group effort against strategic targets on Kyushu and Honshu.

=== Japanese occupation duty ===
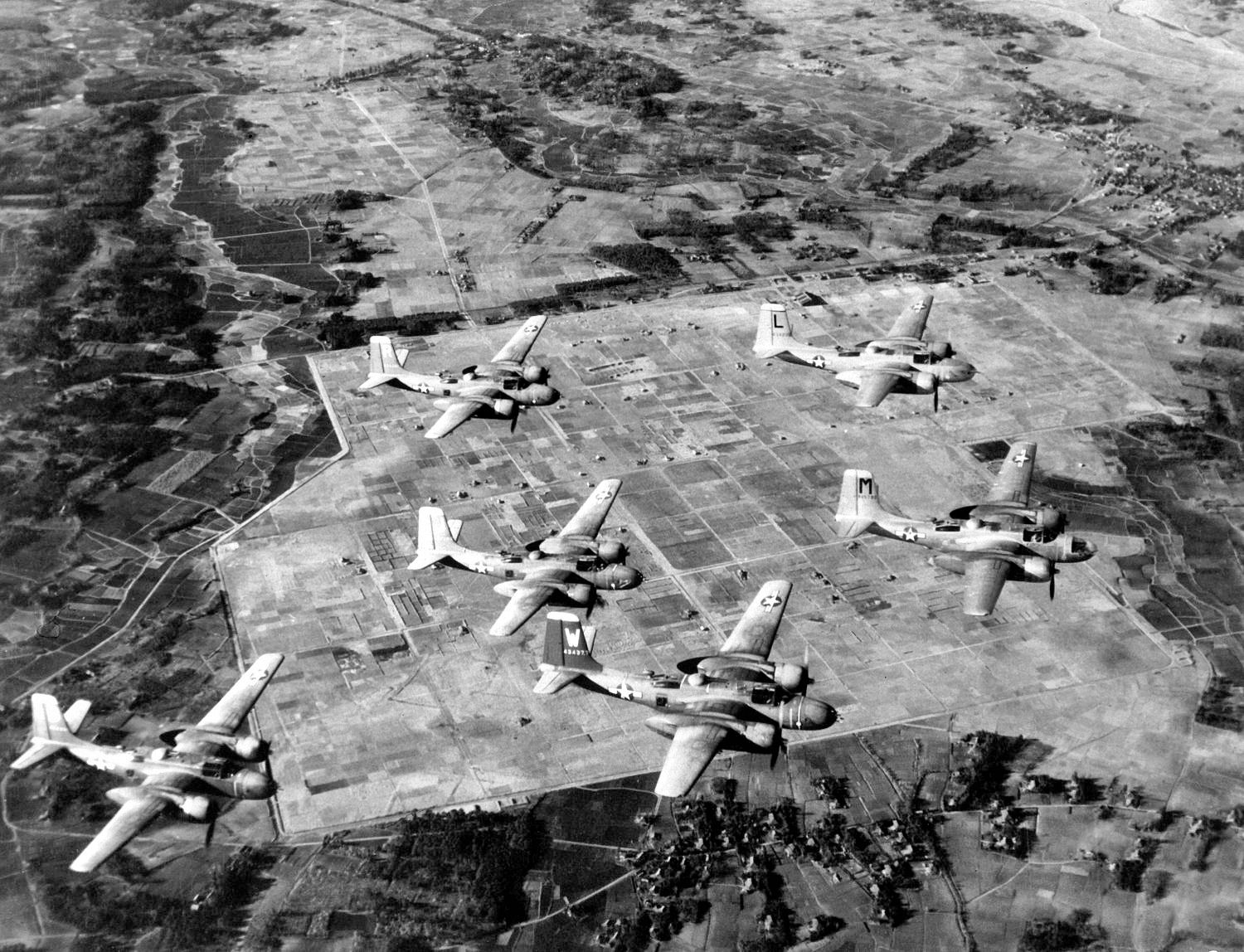
8th Bombardment Squadron – A-26 Invaders formation flying in Japan, 1947

When peace came the 8th was transferred to the Japanese Home Island of Honshu. The first U.S. personnel from the 3d Group touched down at Atsugi Airfield on 31 August 1945. They landed in one of the new A-26B Invaders, and the landing was not without controversy as other units claimed the squadron was "grandstanding". The remainder of the group arrived at Atsugi on 8 September.

By the end of 1945, the last A-20 had been transferred out, and the group became an all A-26 outfit. The wartime personnel strengths declined rapidly as the Army underwent demobilization. By January 1946, the 13th, 89th and 90th Bombardment Squadrons had been reduced to one officer and one enlisted man each. The remaining personnel were concentrated in the 8th Bombardment Squadron. By late March, the personnel situation had improved to the extent that the 90th Bombardment Squadron could be made operational again. On 20 August 1946, the 3d Bomb Group moved to Yokota Air Base, near Tokyo. It considered naming Yokota after its Medal of Honor recipient, Major Raymond Wilkins. However, the name was not accepted.

On 18 August 1948, the new Air Force organizational configuration was in place, and the 3d Bombardment Wing was activated. In March 1950, the 3d Wing moved to Johnson Air Base to accommodate the 35th Fighter Wing, which took its place at Yokota to perform the air defense mission nearer Tokyo.

=== Korean War ===
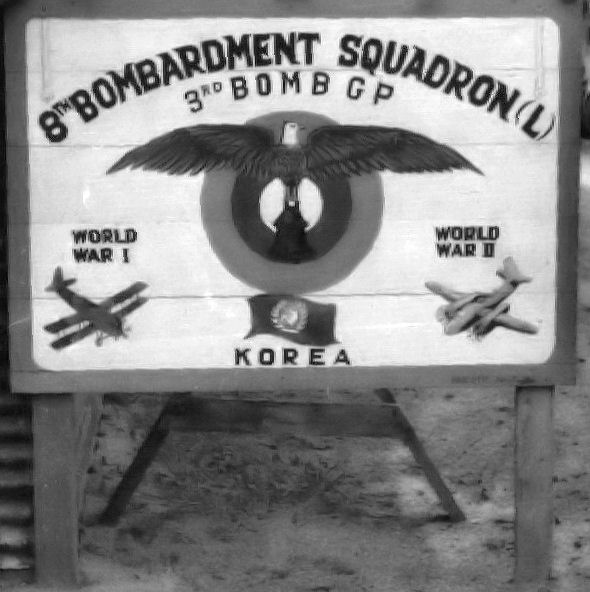
8th Bombardment Squadron -Korea Sign

On 22 June 1950, the 8th Squadron went on temporary duty to Ashiya Airfield, Japan for a Far East Air Forces readiness test. On 25 June, North Korea crossed the 38th parallel and invaded South Korea. Upon being notified of North Korea's attack, the United Nations Security Council immediately called for the end of aggression. On 27 June, the United Nations asked its members to go to the aid of the Republic of Korea. On that day the 8th was called on to aid in the resulting Korean War from their TDY location at Ashiya. The first combat mission of the 3d Group was flown by the 8th that day against the rail yards at Munsan, South Korea. which had been captured by North Korean forces. Their first attack against North Korea was on 29 June when they bombed the main airfield in Pyongyang, making it the first United Nations strike at the Communist forces above the 38th parallel.

On 30 June, President Harry S. Truman ordered ground troops into action at Osan. As the first American soldiers of Task Force Smith encountered the enemy, overhead were the 8th Bombardment Squadron's B-26 attack bombers. From Yokota they hit the North Korean forces with napalm, high explosives, rockets and incendiaries. In July, the squadron personnel and equipment were moved to Iwakuni Air Base to be closer to the Korean peninsula. From Iwakuni, The 8th Squadron flew its B-26 missions against the North. Between 27 June and 31 July, the 3d Bombardment Group destroyed 42 tanks, 163 vehicles, 39 locomotives, 65 bridges, 14 supply dumps and killed or wounded nearly 5,000 enemy troops. The 3d Bombardment Group flew 676 day and night sorties that included interdiction, low-level attack, close air support and night intruder. The achievement earned the 3rd Bombardment Group its third Distinguished Unit Citation and the Republic of Korea Presidential Unit Citation.

On 1 August 1950 the 8th started flying night intruder missions. The 8th flew this type of mission for the remainder of the war except for an occasional special mission. Late in August the Air Force began flare missions over North Korea. Boeing B-29 Superfortresses would release parachute flares at 10,000 feet that ignited at 6,000 feet, whereupon cooperating B-26 bombers attacked any enemy movement discovered in the illuminated area.

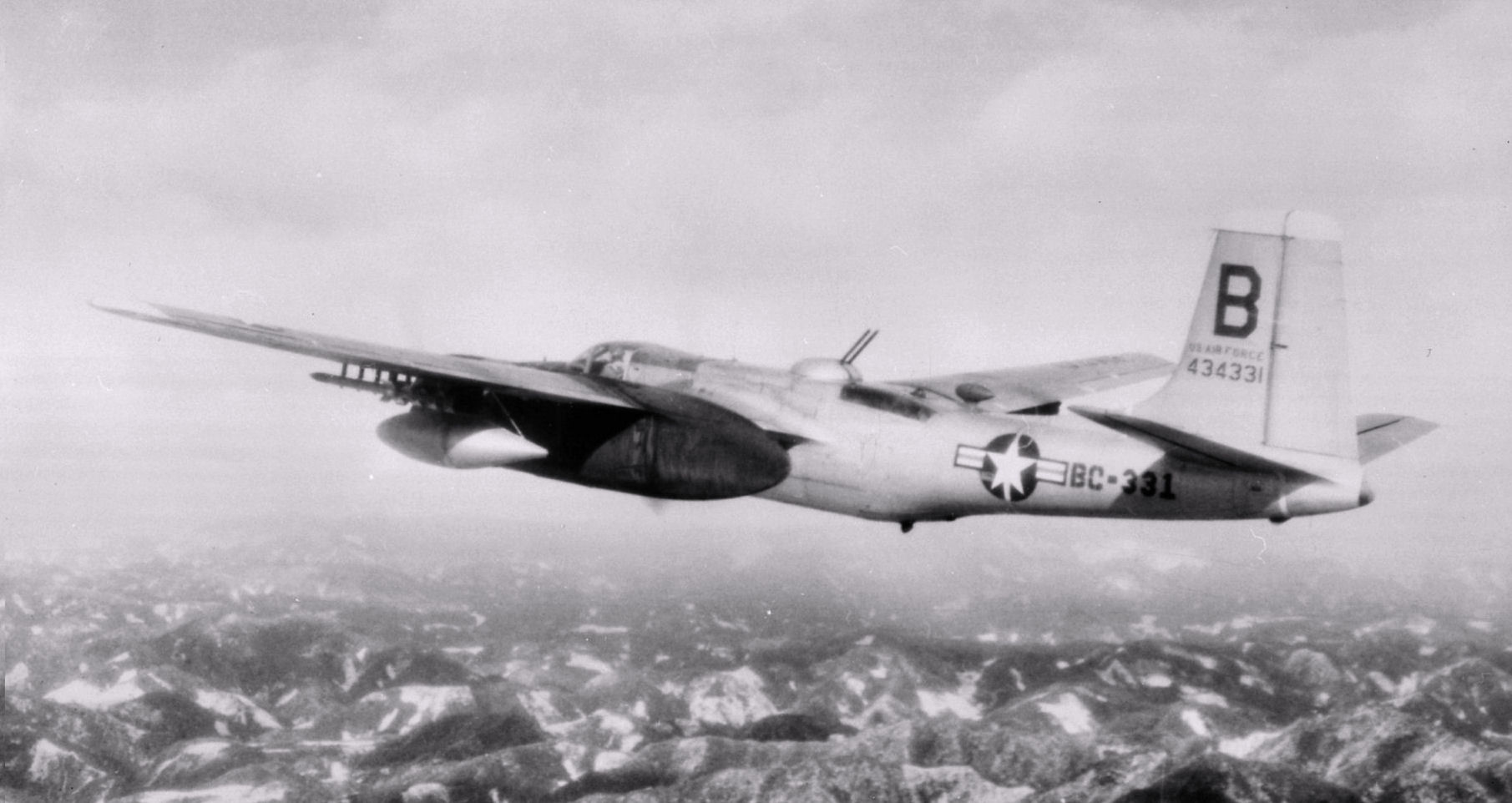
Douglas B-26B-51-DL Invader – 44-34331, 8th Bombardment Squadron, Over Korea on a daylight flight in June or July 1950. The aircraft was shot down by flak 17 February 1951.

On 15 September 1950 the US 1st Marine Division, ROK marines and 7th Infantry Division troops led the surprise attack at Inchon. The landing met with little resistance and was resounding success with few casualties. On 16 September 1950, the Eighth Army launched an offensive to break out of the Pusan Perimeter and link up with the Inchon forces 150 miles (240 km) away. Supporting Eighth Army, the 8th flew 60 medium altitude, 99 low-level, and 298 night intruder sorties. During these missions they dropped 422 tons of explosives.

After the breakout from the Pusan Perimeter in November 1950, the 8th flew daily strike missions out of Iwakuni and at times recovering at Taegu Air Base (K-2), which forced the crews to fly long, arduous missions that sometimes lasted more than six hours. When the Chinese People's Volunteer Army attacked in the Spring of 1951, Far East Air Forces requested that the light bomber wings increase their nightly sortie rate. The only way to do this was to double up some of the missions. For several months, the crews flew from Iwakuni to their patrol sectors in North Korea, completed their mission, and then flew to K-2. Landing a B-26 at night at K-2 was no easy feat because the Pierced Steel Planking on the runway had begun to deteriorate. The B-26s landing there tore up dozens of tires, and more than a few accidents resulted. Also, the tires were in short supply, so each one lost at K-2 was hard to replace. If the B-26 crews got down at K-2 without incident, they could find a place to grab a quick catnap as their planes were readied for the next mission. About an hour later, they were airborne and heading north to their next target area. Four hours later, utterly exhausted, they were back in Japan, after up to ten hours of flight and combat.

After Kunsan Air Base (K-8) South Korea was constructed with a suitable runway, the unit relocated there on 18 August 1951. The Army's 808th Engineer Aviation Battalion had built a 5,000 feet (1,500 m) runway for the light bombers, but the conditions at the base were still relatively primitive. Many of the creature comforts such as latrines and showers were still under construction.

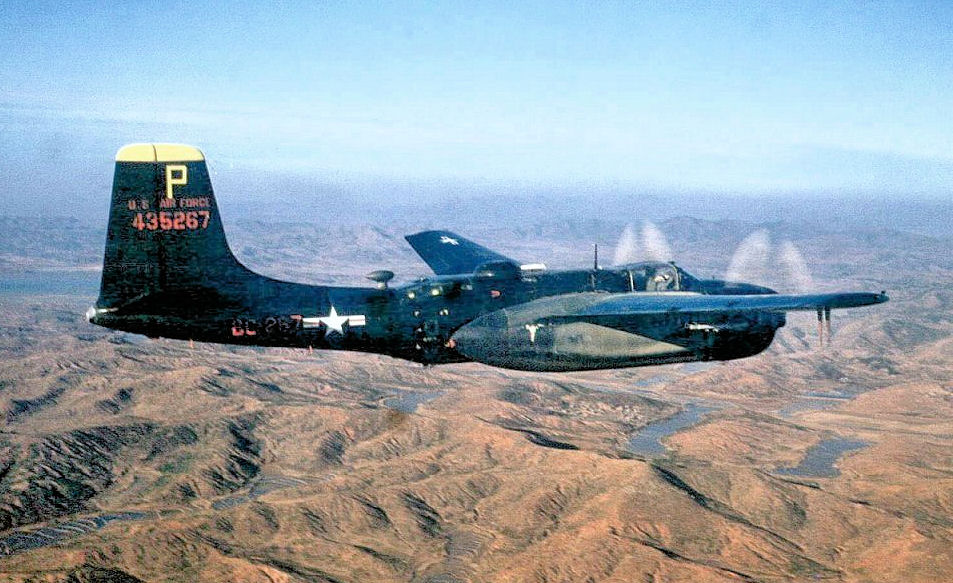
8th Bomb Squadron DouglasB-26C-30-DT Invader 44-35267 in black night intruder motif.

The night flying missions of the 8th aided in tallying up figures for locomotive and vehicle "kills". North Koreans found it almost suicidal to move large vehicle convoys by day. When they did attempt it, marauding fighter-bombers chopped the convoys to pieces. Moving large convoys at night seemed the only sensible choice, so the North Koreans began hauling their supplies under the cover of darkness. Rail traffic also took to moving at night, speeding from one tunnel to another until dawn. But night flying was a dangerous undertaking. The North Koreans knowing they had to protect their truck convoys placed flak batteries on hills and mountaintops that overlooked crucial road routes. At times, the gunners actually had to fire down into the valleys to hit the attacking B-26s. These flak traps could be deadly, and their plunging fire claimed many B-26 lives.

For almost two years the air war went on and losses mounted and the claims piled up. In June 1953 the pace picked up with a full-scale maximum effort. Armament crew chiefs met the ships at night and readied the aircraft for early morning flights. Combat crews returned from missions, debriefed, and climbed back bleary-eyed and weary into their ships for early morning sorties. For two months this grueling routine was adhered to as schedule requirements rose.

The 3d Bombardment Wing, one of the first air units to intervene on the side of the United Nations in 1950 was also the last air unit to drop ordnance on the North on 27 July 1953. With a few scant minutes remaining before the 22:00 deadline, a B-26 Night Intruder bearing the Liberty Squadron's yellow tail, opened its bomb bays and dropped the last load of explosives that detonated in North Korea. And then the stillness of the Armistice took hold.

=== Cold War in Japan and Korea ===
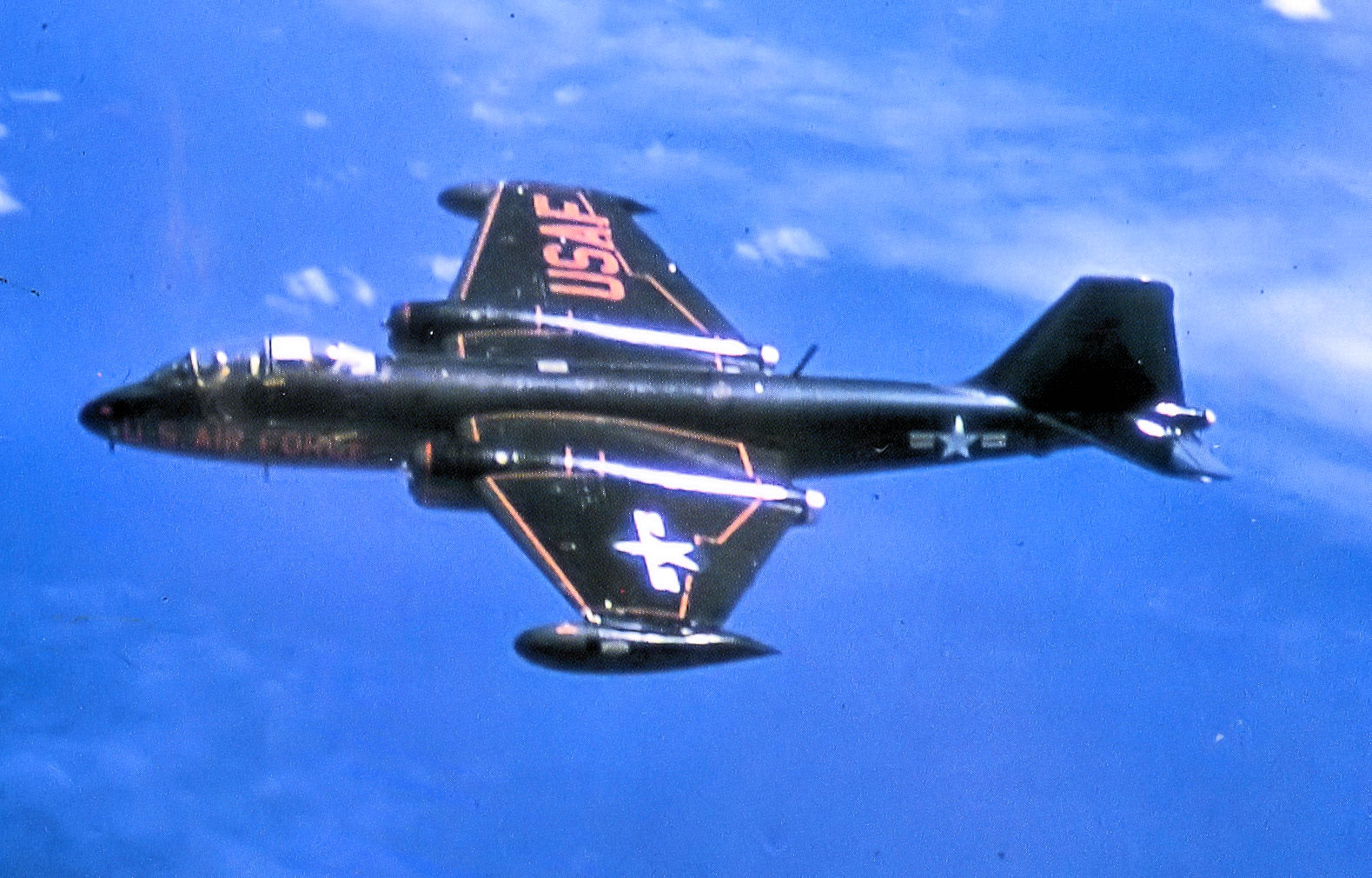
B-57B Canberra 3d Bombardment Wing Johnson AB Japan 1956.

After the cease-fire, the 3d BW returned to peacetime duty remaining at Kunsan AB, South Korea until October 1954, when it moved back to Johnson AB, Japan. Beginning in January 1956, the 3d Bombardment Group converted from the aging World War II era B-26 to the jet-powered Martin B-57B Canberra Night Intruder. However, the USAF was not very happy with the B-57B as it was initially produced. It was deemed to be inadequate to meet the night intruder and close support role for which it had originally been designed. The service life of the B-57B with USAF tactical bomb groups was planned to be brief. After three years of service with the B-57s in tactical bomb groups, the decision was made to phase out the B-57.

Since nuclear weapons could not be stationed in Japan, in August 1958, the 3d Group set up a rotation of crews to stand nuclear alert at Kunsan Air Base in South Korea. This rotation continued until April 1964, when the 3d Group returned to Yokota to begin the process of inactivation. The 8th Bomb Squadron however remained in the Pacific and was realigned under the Thirteenth Air Force. It was attached to the 41st Air Division and later to the 2d Air Division as the USAF mulled over the fate of the B-57B. During this time, it continued the rotational nuclear alert at Kunsan AB.

=== Vietnam War ===
The increasing demands for aircraft in South Vietnam caused the Air force to reconsider the inactivation of the 8th Bomb Squadron and the retirement of the B-57B. The squadron was moved to Clark Air Base, Philippines.

In 1964, the worsening situation in South Vietnam led the United States to introduce Canberra tactical bombers to perform tactical bombing strikes against the Viet Cong (VC). In early 1964 orders were issued to the 8th and 13th Bombardment Squadrons for reassignment from rotational South Korean alert duty at Yokota for movement to Clark Air Base, Philippines for possible action in South Vietnam. As it happened, this move did not take place until 5 August, following the Gulf of Tonkin incident in which North Vietnamese gunboats clashed with United States Navy destroyers.

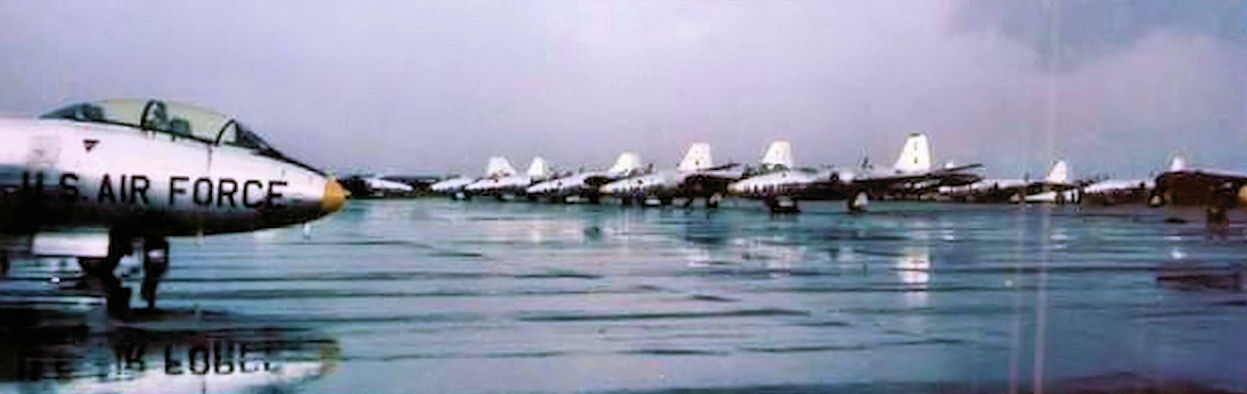
Martin B-57B bombers at Bien Hoa AB South Vietnam August 1964. Photo shows the aircraft shortly after their arrival, in natural aluminum and unpainted. Aircraft also show their In-squadron identification letters

According to the initial plan, 20 B-57Bs of the 8th and 13th Bombardment Squadrons were to be stationed at Bien Hoa Air Base. This would mark the first deployment of jet combat aircraft to Vietnam. However, this was technically a violation of the Geneva Protocols which forbade the introduction of jet combat aircraft to Vietnam, so the squadrons were assigned to the 405th Fighter Wing at Clark and carried out rotational deployments to South Vietnam on a temporary basis. The deployments began and the first B-57s arrived in the first week of August 1964.

The initial deployment to Vietnam got off on the wrong foot. The first two B-57Bs to land collided with each other on the ground and blocked the runway at Bien Hoa, forcing the rest of the flight to divert to Tan Son Nhut Airport in Saigon. One of the B-57Bs was hit by ground fire and dived into the ground during approach at Tan Son Nhut and was destroyed, killing both crew members. Ground rescue parties were unable to reach the planes due to strong VC fire.

During the next few weeks, more B-57Bs were moved from Clark to Bien Hoa to make good these losses and to reinforce the original deployment. The B-57s shared an open-air, three-sided hangar with the Vietnamese Air Force that flew Douglas A-1 Skyraider aircraft, and things got so crowded at Bien Hoa at that time that some of the B-57s had to be sent back to Clark. Also, maintenance facilities for the B-57 at Bien Hoa were scarce.

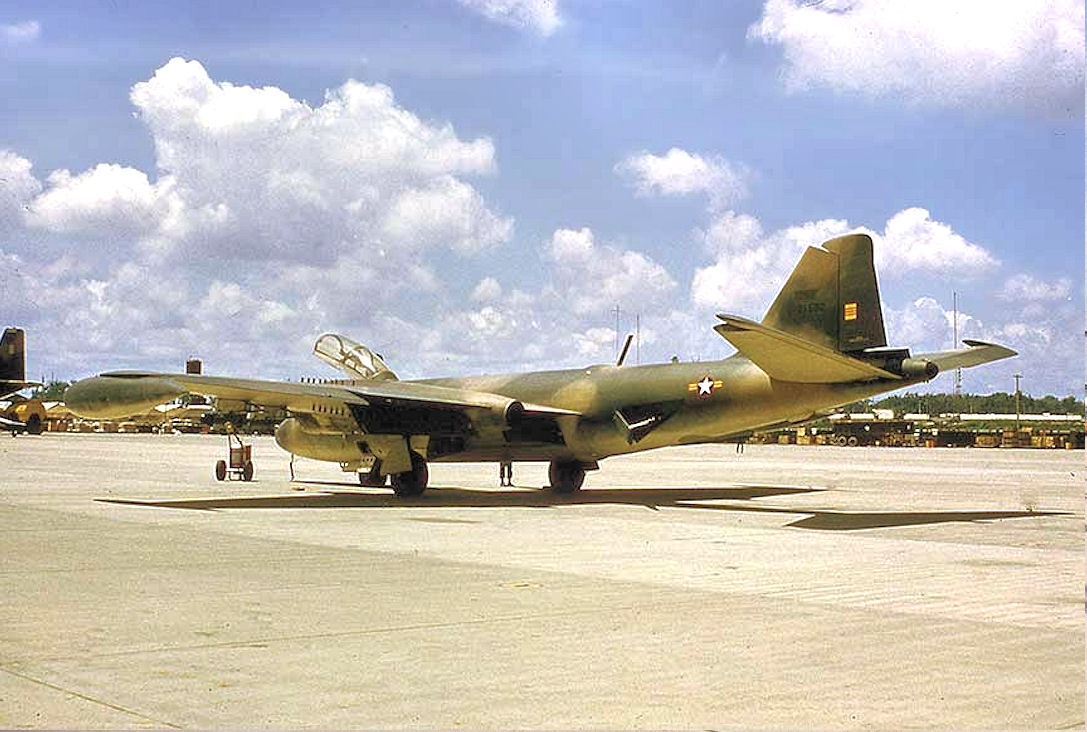
Martin B-57B-MA 52-1532 loaned to SVNAF 1965. Aircraft was later returned to 8th BS, 1967. Shot down with by ground fire 7 mi SSE of Ban Kate, Savannakhet Province, Laos 22 February 1969. Both crew KIA.

Further VC mortar attacks led General William Westmoreland on 19 February 1965 to release B-57Bs for combat operations. The first such mission took place on that same day, when the government of Vietnam requested the use of the B-57s from Bien Hoa and North American F-100 Super Sabre aircraft from USAF bases in Thailand to assist in an attack against a large VC force between An Khe and Pleiku in the Central Highlands. The VC had an isolated South Vietnam Army unit pinned down. That same day, the B-57s' first real mission was against communist forces in Phước Tuy Province, 40 miles southeast of Saigon. This strike was, incidentally, the first time that live ordnance had been delivered against an enemy in combat from a USAF jet bomber.

In late May 1965 the surviving Canberras from the temporary duty 8th and 13th Bombardment Squadrons at Bien Hoa that had been operating from Tan Son Nhut after the Bien Hoa runway disaster were moved up to Da Nang Air Base to carry out night interdiction operations over North Vietnam and Laos. In order to make up losses incurred at Bien Hoa, some B-57Bs had to be transferred to Vietnam from the Kansas Air National Guard, and 12 B-57Es had to be withdrawn from target-towing duties and reconfigured as bombers.

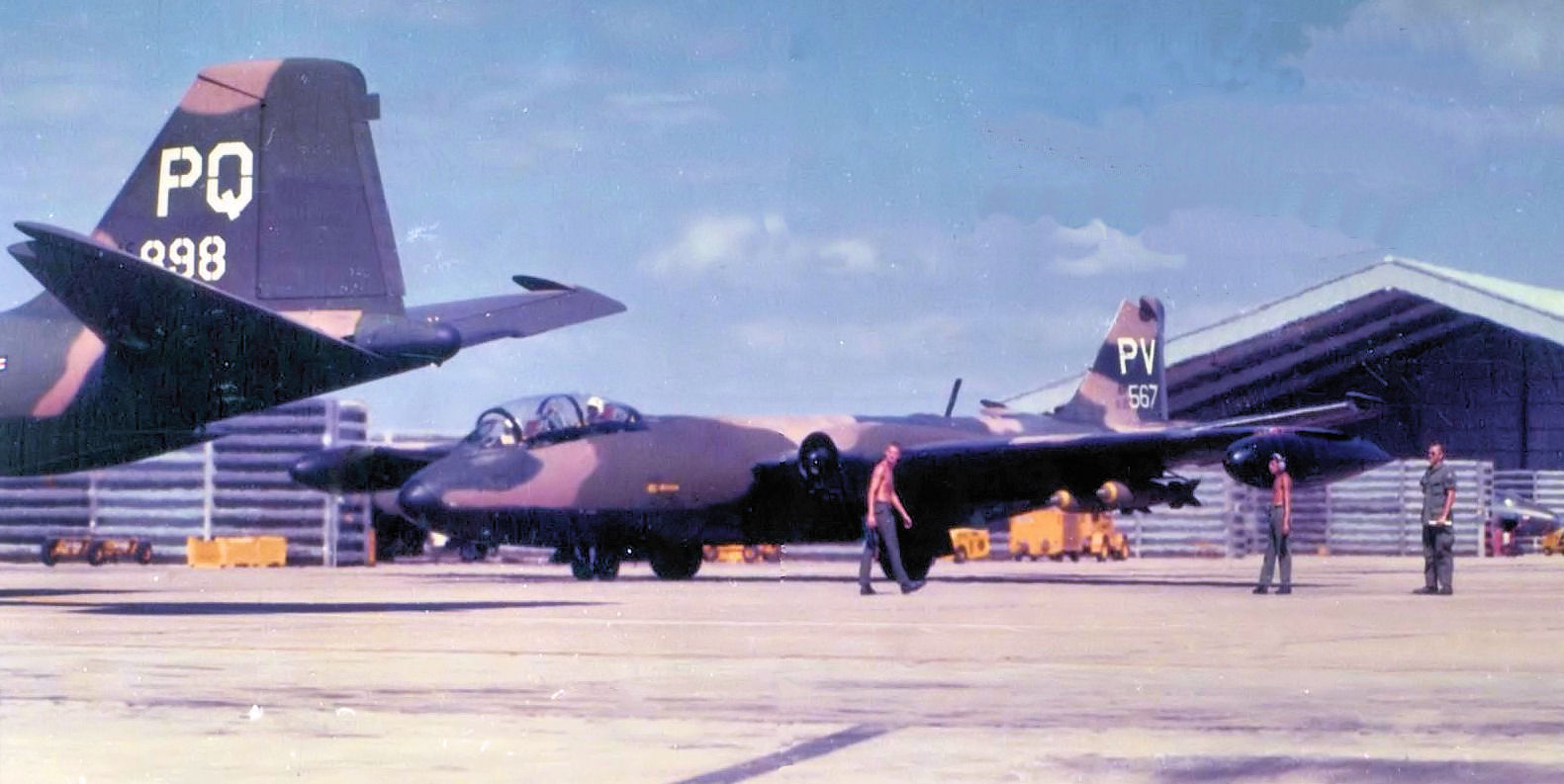
Martin B-57B bombers at Phan Rang AB South Vietnam 1968. 8th Bombardment Squadron Martin B-57B-MA 53-3898 converted to B-57G in 1969. Returned to the United States and retired to MASDC as BM0092 February 7, 1974. 13th Bomb Squadron Martin B-57B-MA 52-1567 converted to RB-57B. Loaned to South Vietnam AF but Remained under US control, 1965. Program cancelled and returned to USAF 20 April 1967. W/o when hit by ground fire but was able to fly back to Phan Rang 15 March 1969. Suffered dual flameout near Pleiku, South Vietnam. Both crew ejected and were rescued by USAF HH-43 helicopter.

The squadron operated on rotating deployments from the 405th Fighter Wing at Clark, the B-57s carried out attack on trails used by communist trucks, storage and bivouac areas, bridges, buildings, and antiaircraft artillery sites. In October 1966, combat attrition in the B-57 force plus the increasing availability of higher performance fighters to carry out the air war against North Vietnam caused the 8th and 13th Bombardment Squadrons to be withdrawn from operations against the North from Da Nang Air Base and relocated to Phan Rang Air Base. At Phan Rang, the squadrons ended their temporary rotations from Clark and were assigned to the 35th Tactical Fighter Wing.

From their new base, the Canberras carried out attacks against communist forces in the Central Highlands and supported U.S. ground troops in the Iron Triangle. In April 1967, the USAF Canberras were joined by the Canberra B.20s of No. 2 Squadron, Royal Australian Air Force.

In January 1968, the 13th Squadron was inactivated and the 8th Squadron was left in permanent residence at Phan Rang. The main emphasis was again on night interdiction against the Ho Chi Minh Trail. By November 1969, the 8th's strength was down to only 9 aircraft, and it was decided that it was time to retire the B-57B from active service. In addition, as part of the United States Air Force withdrawal from Vietnam the ceiling on Air Force members in country required a reduction in units there, and the unit was one of two squadrons inactivated as part of Operation Keystone Cardinal. The surviving aircraft were sent back to the United States in September and October and put into storage at Davis-Monthan Air Force Base.

==== A-37 Counter-Insurgency Operations ====
The 8th moved to Bien Hoa Air Base, where it redesignated as the 8th Attack Squadron and absorbed the Cessna A-37B Dragonfly of the 310th and 311th Attack Squadrons and given a counter-insurgency (COIN) mission.

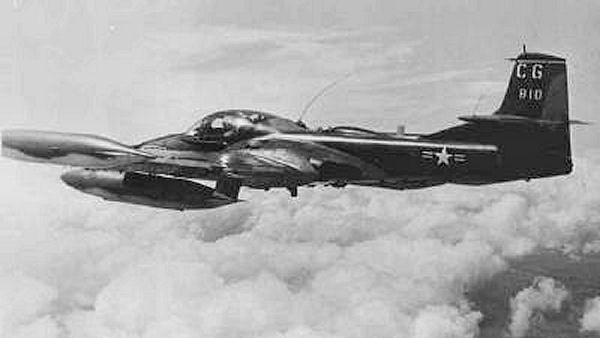
A-37B of the 8th Special Operations Squadron – Phan Rang AB, South Vietnam – 1970.

The 8th flew round-the-clock missions on both preplanned airstrikes and immediate infantry requests. Whenever a forward air controller observed signs of enemy activity, 8th pilots were ready to respond with rockets, bombs and machine guns. On 30 September 1970, the 8th Attack Squadron was redesignated the 8th Special Operations Squadron and transferred to the 35th Tactical Fighter Wing. The 8th assumed the tail code "EK".

By 1971, the Vietnamization of the war was in full swing, and the A-37s of the squadron began to be transferred to the Republic of Vietnam Air Force. On 30 September 1972, the squadron was the last USAF combat squadron to withdraw from South Vietnam.

The squadron moved, without personnel or equipment, to the 405th Fighter Wing at Clark Air Base. On 1 July 1973, the unit was redesignated as the 8th Fighter Squadron but remained an unmanned and unequipped unit. The reason it was not simply inactivated is that the unit was the second oldest squadron in the Air Force was historically significant. It remained assigned without personnel or aircraft until March 1974.

=== Special operations mission ===
The unit reverted to its old name the 8th Special Operations Squadron on 1 March 1974 when it moved without personnel or equipment to Eglin Air Force Auxiliary Field No. 9 (Hurlburt Field) Florida. In Florida it transitioned to the Lockheed MC-130E Combat Talon I The 8th became the U.S.-based operator of Combat Talon, and provided five of the eight Talon crews participating in Operation Eagle Claw, the attempt to rescue Americans taken hostage by the government of Iran. Its members crewed the lead Combat Talon and all three of the Lockheed EC-130 refuelers on the night one mission to "Desert One", and was to crew the four Talons of the night two phase of the rescue attempt in April 1980. During that mission, five members of the squadron lost their lives. The squadron received its motto "with the guts to try" from this operation.

The squadron was called on again in October 1983 to lead the way in Operation Urgent Fury, the rescue of American students endangered on the island of Grenada. After long hours of flight, the aircrew members faced intense ground fire to airdrop United States Army Rangers on time, on target. They subsequently followed up with three psychological operations leaflet drops designed to encourage the Cubans to discontinue the conflict.

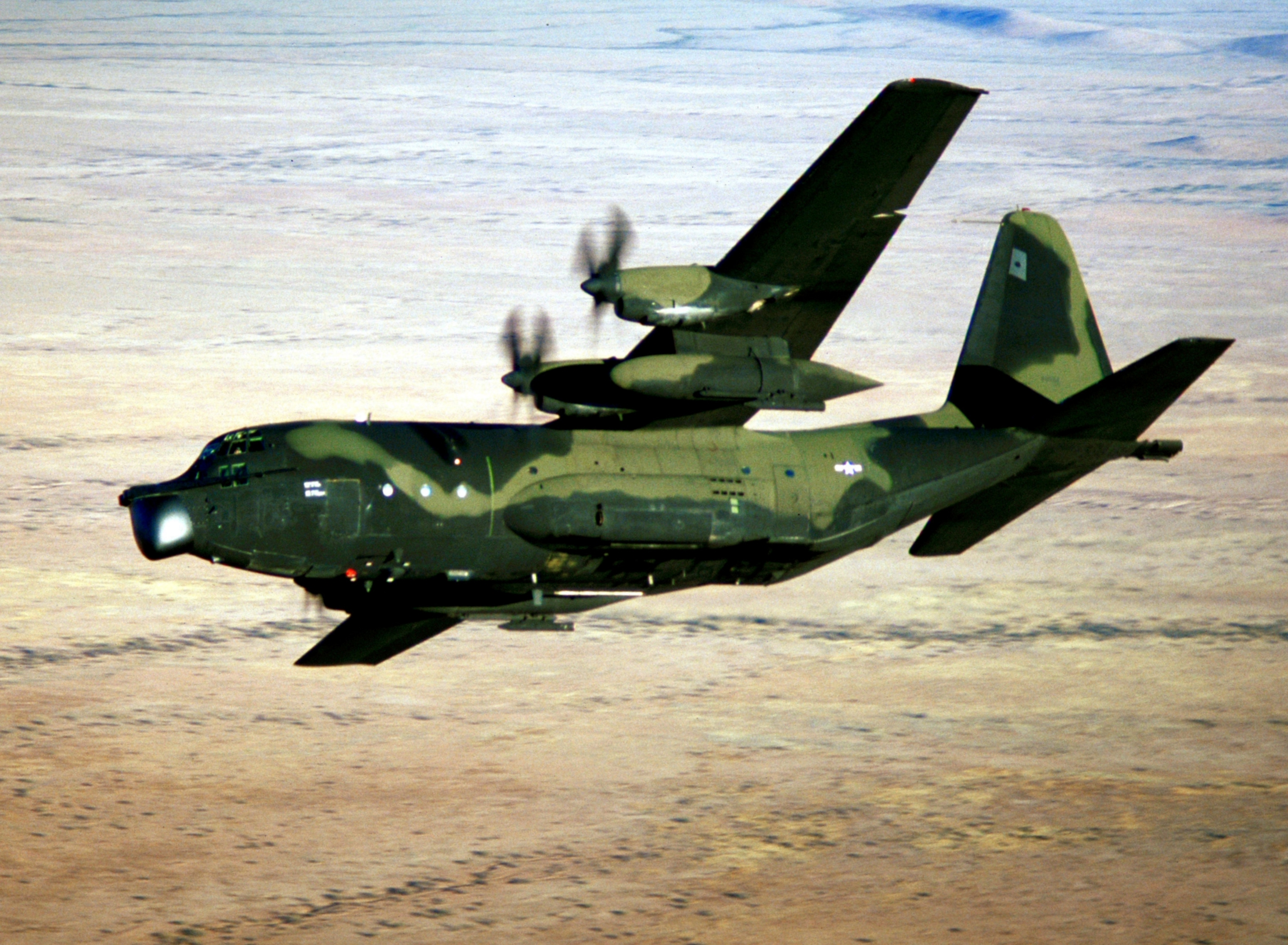
Lockheed MC-130E Combat Talon II aircraft banking to the right while flying low-level maneuvers over the Arizona desert near Davis-Monthan Air Force Base in 1980. The aircraft was assigned to the 8th Special Operations Squadron at Hurlburt Field, Florida.

Members of the 8th were mobilized in December 1989 as part of a joint task force for Operation Just Cause in the Republic of Panama. Following the conflict, it was an 8th MC-130 Combat Talon I that flew General Manuel Noriega back to the United States to stand trial.

Operation Desert Shield commenced in August 1990 when Iraq invaded Kuwait. The 8th deployed to Saudi Arabia as a deterrent against the Iraqi threat to its southern neighbor. In January 1991, when Iraq failed to comply with United Nations directives to withdraw from Kuwait, the proven skills of the 8th were called on once again as Operation Desert Shield escalated into Operation Desert Storm. The 8th played a pivotal role in the success of coalition forces as they liberated Kuwait by dropping 11 15,000-pound BLU-82 bombs and 23 million leaflets and conducting numerous aerial refuelings of special operations helicopters.

The 8th supported Operations Provide Promise and Deny Flight in Bosnia, Operation Assured Response in Liberia and Operation Southern Watch in Saudi Arabia. Even Hollywood relied on the crews of the 8th in the 1997 hit movie Air Force One. When the MC-130H Combat Talon II became fully operational in 1997, the 8th became an associate squadron without assigned aircraft, performing its operational duties using MC-130E Combat Talon I's of the 711th Special Operations Squadron of Air Force Reserve Command.

When the World Trade Center and the Pentagon were attacked on 11 September 2001, the 8th was propelled into Operation Enduring Freedom in late 2001. The squadron was nearly completely deployed, operating from several locations in Afghanistan simultaneously to unseat the Taliban rulers and install the interim government. The 8th supported operations by resupplying special operations forces operators in the field, refueling helicopters, and landing at short unprepared fields all over the country. When Operation Iraqi Freedom kicked off in 2003, the 8th was once again at the forefront. Its crews were some of the first to cross the border as hostilities began. Such a high operations tempo led to the 8th SOS being the Air Force's most deployed active-duty squadron in 2002 and 2003.

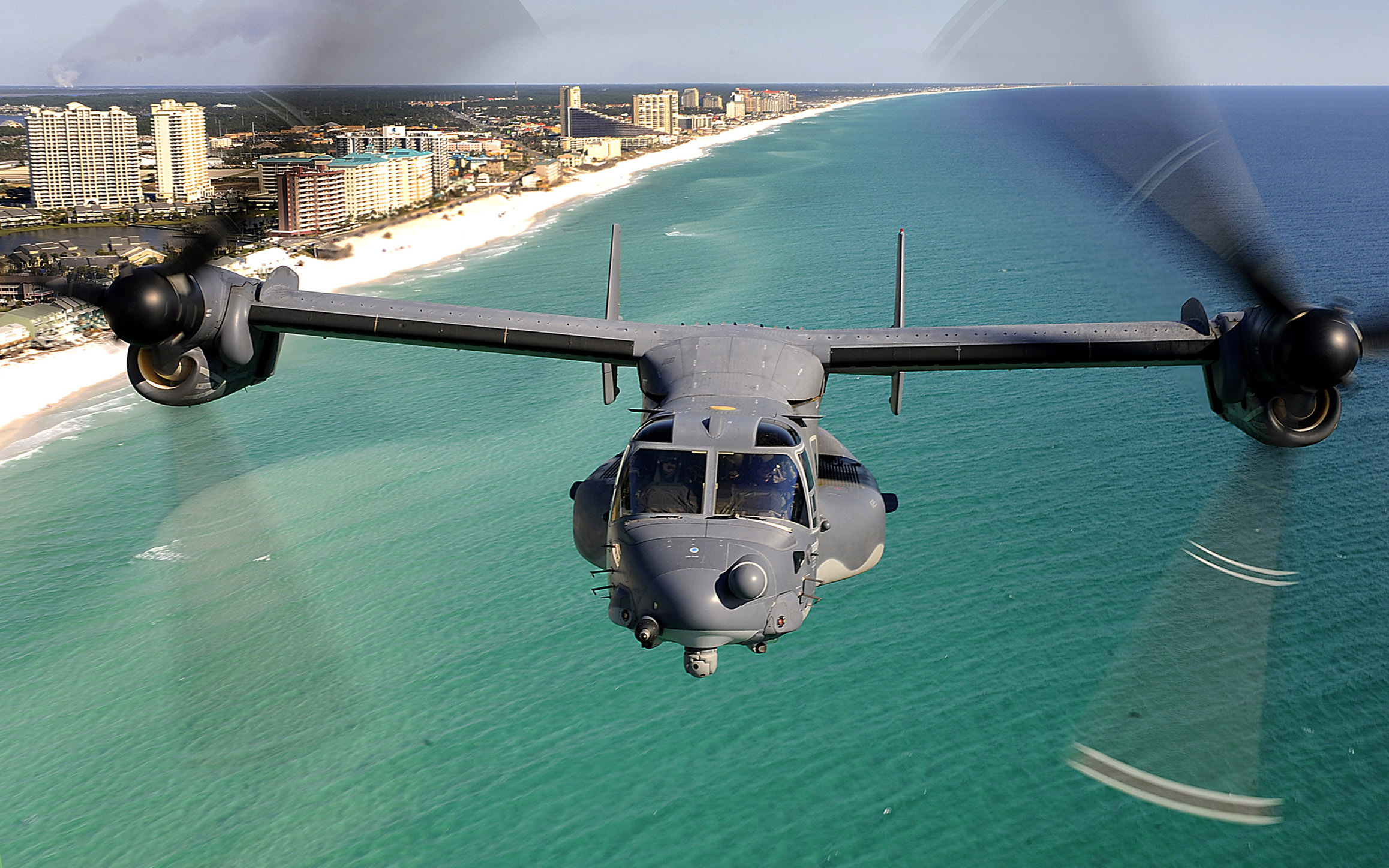
A CV-22 flies over Florida's Emerald Coast

The 8th SOS opened a new chapter in its distinguished history when it transitioned from the Combat Talon I to the Bell Boeing CV-22 Osprey in August 2006. Development of the CV-22 Osprey stems directly from a 1980 Iran hostage crisis. After three decades of development and testing, the CV-22 passed its final exam with the completion of initial operational test and evaluation flown by the 8th rew. The CV-22 fulfills the Air Force requirement for a platform capable of long-range, infiltration, and exfiltration to targets located at any location. With the combined ability to fly at C-130 speeds and land to austere landing areas like a helicopter, the Osprey brings an advanced capability to combatant commanders.

In 2008, the 8th logged over 190 transoceanic flight hours during a self-deployment to the nation of Mali supporting United States Africa Command's Flintlock exercise. In 2009, 8th crews deployed to Soto Cano Air Base, Honduras, where they delivered 40,000 pounds of critical food and medical supplies to remote Honduran villages. During the same year the 8th culminated its years of testing and evaluation with its first-ever combat deployment in support of Operation Iraqi Freedom. There, crews flew 123 total missions, of which 45 were direct assaults against known enemy insurgents.

In June 2009, the 8th delivered humanitarian supplies to Honduras. In November 2009, the 8th returned from a three-month deployment in Iraq.

In 2010, the squadron deployed to Afghanistan in support of Operation Enduring Freedom. During this deployment, its crews flew 875 combat sorties, 642 direct assault sorties, infiltrated 4069 special operations force assaulters, transported 284 terrorists and high-value targets and delivered over 87,000 pounds of supplies to allied forces. In April 2010, one of 8th's Ospreys crashed while conducting combat operations in Zabul Province and two members of the squadron were killed.

== Lineage ==
- Organized as the 8th Aero Squadron on 21 June 1917

Redesignated 8th Aero Squadron (Corps Observation) on 31 July 1918
Redesignated 8th Aero Squadron on 3 May 1919
Redesignated 8th Squadron (Surveillance) c. June 1921
Redesignated 8th Squadron (Attack) c. November 1921
Redesignated 8th Attack Squadron on 25 January 1923
Redesignated 8th Bombardment Squadron (Light) on 15 December 1939
Redesignated 8th Bombardment Squadron (Dive) on 28 September 1942
Redesignated 8th Bombardment Squadron (Light) on 25 May 1943
Redesignated 8th Bombardment Squadron, Light c. April 1944
Redesignated 8th Bombardment Squadron, Light, Night Intruder on 25 June 1951
Redesignated 8th Bombardment Squadron, Tactical on 1 October 1955
Redesignated 8th Attack Squadron on 18 November 1969
Redesignated 8th Special Operations Squadron on 30 September 1970
Redesignated 8th Fighter Squadron on 1 July 1973
Redesignated 8th Special Operations Squadron on 1 March 1974.

=== Assignments ===
- Headquarters, Camp Kelly, 21 June 1917
- Headquarters, Selfridge Aviation Field, 8 July 1917
- Aviation Concentration Center, 28 October 1917
- Headquarters American Rest Camp, 8 December 1917
- Headquarters American Air Service Camp, 1 May 1918
- Air Service Replacement Concentration Center, 20 July 1918
- I Corps Observation Training Center, 30 July 1918
- IV Corps Observation Group, 31 August 1918 (attached to 1st Division), 8–14 September 1918
- VI Corps Observation Group, 23 October 1918
- Advanced Section Services of Supply, 5 February-21 Apr 1919
- Post Headquarters, Mitchell Field, 3 May 1919
- Post Headquarters, Kelly Field, 25 May 1919
- Army Surveillance Group (later 1st Surveillance Group, 3d Group (Attack), 3d Attack Group, 3d Bombardment Group) 1 July 1919 (attached to 3d Bombardment Wing after 13 August 1956)
- 3d Bombardment Wing, 25 October 1957 (attached to 41st Air Division after 1 September 1963)
- 41st Air Division, 8 January 1964 (attached to 405th Fighter Wing after 9 April 1964
- Thirteenth Air Force, 24 April 1964 (attached to 405th Fighter Wing, 24 April-17 November 1964; further attached to 34th Tactical Group, 5 August-3 November 1964)
- 405th Fighter Wing, 18 November 1964 (attached to 33d Tactical Group 18 June 1965; 2d Air Division, 28 June-7 July 1965; 6252d Tactical Fighter Wing, 8 July-15 August 1965, 16 October-16 December 1965 and 15 February-7 April 1966; 35th Tactical Fighter Wing, 8–18 April 1966, 15 June-15 August 1966, 12 October-12 December 1966, 11 February-12 April 1967, 7 June-2 August 1967, and 26 September-21 November 1967)
- 35th Tactical Fighter Wing, 15 January 1968 (attached to 405th Fighter Wing until 17 January 1968)
- 3d Tactical Fighter Wing, 15 November 1969
- 35th Tactical Fighter Wing, 30 September 1970 (attached to 315th Tactical Airlift Wing after 16 July 1971)
- 315th Tactical Airlift Wing, 31 July 1971
- 377th Air Base Group (later 377th Air Base Wing), 15 January 1972 (attached to 6251st Air Base Squadron, 1–14 September 1972, Detachment 2, 377th Air Base Wing, 15–30 September 1972)
- 405th Fighter Wing, 1 October 1972
- 1st Special Operations Wing (later 834th Tactical Composite Wing, 1st Special Operations Wing), 1 March 1974
- 1st Special Operations Group (later 16th Operations Group, 1st Special Operations Group), 22 September 1992 – present.

=== Stations ===
World War I

- Camp Kelly (later Kelly Field0, Texas, 21 June 1917
- Selfridge Field, Michigan, 8 July 1917
- Aviation Concentration Center, Garden City, New York, 28 October–22 November 1917
- Winchester, England, 8 December 1917
- Dartford, England, c. 24 December 1917

Detachments at Thetford, RFC Wyton, and RFC Northolt, England)

- Thetford, England, 1 May–17 July 1918
- Le Havre, France, 18 July 1918
- St. Maixent Replacement Barracks, France, 20 July 1918
- Amanty Airdrome, France, 30 July 1918
- Ourches Aerodrome, France, 31 August 1918
- Gengault Aerodrome (Toul), France, 29 September 1918
- Saizerais Aerodrome, France, 23 October 1918
- Colombey-les-Belles Airdrome, France, 11 February 1919
- Fargues-Saint-Hilaire, France, 22 February–18 April 1919
- Mitchel Field, New York, 3 May 1919
- Kelly Field, Texas, 25 May 1919

Intra-War Period

- Mitchel Field, New York, 3 May 1919
- Kelly Field, Texas, 25 May 1919

Flight at McAllen Field, Texas, after 25 July 1919

- McAllen Field, Texas, 13 August 1919

Flight operated from Laredo Field, Texas, 15 August 1919 – 3 August 1920
Flight operated from Pope Field, North Carolina, after 13 August 1920
Detachment of flight operated from Laredo Field, Texas, after 3 August 1920

- Kelly Field, Texas, 2 July 1921

Flight at Pope Field, North Carolina until 26 November 1921

- Fort Crockett, Texas, 30 June 1926
- Barksdale Field, Louisiana, 27 February 1935
- Savannah Air Base, Georgia, 8 October 1940 – 19 January 1942

World War II

- Archerfield Airport, Brisbane, Australia, 25 February 1942
- Breddan Airfield, Charters Towers, Australia, c. 17 March 1942
- Port Moresby Airfield Complex, New Guinea, 31 March 1942
- Breddan Airfield, Charters Towers, Australia, c. 9 May 1942
- Port Moresby Airfield Complex, New Guinea, 28 January 1943
- Dobodura Airfield Complex, New Guinea, c. 10 April 1943
- Nadzab Airfield Complex, New Guinea, 1 February 1944
- Hollandia Airfield Complex, New Guinea, 16 May 1944
- Dulag Airfield, Leyte, 15 November 1944
- McGuire Field, San Jose, Mindoro, c. 30 December 1944
- Sobe Field, Okinawa, c. 7 August 1945
- Atsugi Airfield, Japan, c. 26 October 1945
- Yokota Airfield, Japan, c. 20 August 1946

United States Air Force

- Johnson Air Base, Japan, 14 March 1950
- Iwakuni Air Base, Japan, 1 July 1950
- Kunsan Air Base (K-8), South Korea, 18 August 1951
- Johnson Air Base, Japan, 5 October 1954
- Yokota Air Base, Japan, 17 November 1960 (deployed to Clark Air Base, Philippines after 9 April 1964)
- Clark Air Base, Philippines, 24 April 1964

Deployed to:

Bien Hoa Air Base, South Vietnam, 5 August–3 November 1964; Tan Son Nhut Airport, South Vietnam, 18–28 June 1965; Da Nang Air Base, South Vietnam, 28 June–15 August 1965, 16 October–16 December 1965, 15 February–18 April 1966, and 15 June–15 August 1966; Phan Rang Air Base, South Vietnam, 12 October–12 December 1966, 11 February–12 April 1967, 7 June–2 August 1967 and 26 September–22 November 1967)

- Phan Rang Air Base, South Vietnam, 17 January 1968
- Bien Hoa Air Base, South Vietnam, 15 November 1969
- Clark Air Base, Philippines, 1 October 1972 – 1 March 1974
- Eglin Air Force Auxiliary Field No. 9 (Hurlburt Field), Florida, 1 March 1974
- Eglin Air Force Auxiliary Field No. 3 (Duke Field), Florida, 18 February 2000
- Hurlburt Field, Florida, 31 August 2006 – present

=== Aircraft ===
- Curtiss JN-4, 1917
- Dayton-Wright DH-4, 1918–1919; 1919–1934
- Boeing GA-1, 1923
- Douglas O-2, 1926–1928
- Curtiss A-3 Falcon, 1928–1934
- Thomas-Morse O-19, 1932–1936
- Curtiss A-8 Shrike, 1933–1936
- Curtiss A-12 Shrike, 1934–1936
- Northrop A-17 Nomad, 1936–1940
- Curtiss A-18 Shrike, 1937–1941
- Douglas B-18 Bolo, 1939–1941
- Douglas A-24 Banshee, 1941–1942
- Douglas A-20 Havoc, 1941, 1942–1945
- North American B-25 Mitchell, 1942–1945
- Douglas B-26 Invader, 1945–1956
- Martin B-57B Canberra, 1956–1968
- Cessna A-37B Dragonfly, 1968–1972
- Lockheed AC-130H Spectre Gunship, 1975–1976
- Lockheed MC-130E Combat Talon, 1974–2006
- Bell Boeing CV-22 Osprey, 2007 – present

=== Operations ===
- World War I
- World War II
- Korean War
- Vietnam War
- Operation Eagle Claw
- Operation Urgent Fury
- Operation Just Cause
- Operation Desert Shield
- Operation Desert Storm
- Operation Provide Promise
- Operation Deny Flight
- Operation Assured Response
- Operation Southern Watch
- Operation Enduring Freedom
- Operation Iraqi Freedom

== See also ==
- List of American Aero Squadrons
