= Dache =

Dache is a given name and surname. Notable people with the name include:

- Dache McClain Reeves (1894–1972), American aerial photographer
- John Pesa Dache, Kenyan politician
- Lilly Daché (c. 1892 – 1989), French-born American milliner and fashion merchandiser
