= Dache McClain Reeves =

Aerial photographer

Dache McClain Reeves (1894-1972) was an aerial photographer who helped advance aerial archaeology within the United States. In 1918, for his actions in World War I, he was awarded the Distinguished Service Cross and the Silver Star while serving as a First Lieutenant with the 9th Aero Squadron, U.S. Army Air Service.

== Personal life ==
Dache M. Reeves was born in 1894 in Bloomingdale, Georgia to David McClain Reeves and Helen Pearl Barnes. Reeves married Edith Opal Preston. Together they had four daughters: Margaret, Katharine, Anne, and Martha Reeves. Reeves died in 1972 in Clearwater, Florida at age 78.

== Career ==
=== World War I ===
In World War I, Reeves carried out aerial missions from balloons while serving as a first lieutenant with the 9th Aero Squadron Army to perform long-range, strategic night reconnaissance over the United States First Army sector of the Western Front in France. On October 9, 1918, north of Avocourt (Meuse), France, Reeves was attacked by enemy airplanes while in his balloon. He was forced to hang from his basket under fire from enemy machine guns until the balloon burst into flames, causing him to jump. As soon as another balloon was made available, he re-ascended into hostile airspace. On October 23, 1918, near Gesnes (Meuse), he was in a balloon basket when fifteen enemy airplanes attacked from above, and was forced to jump. He again re-ascended, only to have to jump from this balloon as enemy fire caused it to combust. Undeterred, he again ascended to continue locating enemy batteries on the ground. It was for these actions that he was awarded the Distinguished Service Cross and Silver Star.

=== Photography and contributions to aerial archaeology ===
Following his service in World War I, Reeves invented and patented a device for interpreting aerial photography in 1923. In 1927, his book "Aerial photographs, characteristics and military applications" was published.

Aerial archaeology become popularized in Europe following advances made in aerial survey on the Western Front during World War I. In 1934, Reeves began working with the Ohio History Society to carry out an aerial archaeological survey of the ancient mounds and fortification of Ohio, making him among the first to participate in aerial archaeology within the United States. In 1936, the Ohio History Journal published his article "A Newly Discovered Extension of the Newark Works," in which Reeves describes his identification of a previously unknown group of earthworks discovered using aerial imaging. The Ohio History Society described him as "one of America's outstanding experts in aerial photography." Reeve's article "The Great Serpent Mount in Ohio" was published alongside his aerial photographs in an April 1936 issue of Scientific American.

In 1938, Dache Reeves donated his photograph collection of aerial photographs of the Ohio Mounds to the Smithsonian Institution. This collection is now held by the National Museum of the American Indian. In 1938, Reeves also donated a collection of photographs depicting native people of the Philippines to the Bureau of American Ethnology, now housed at the National Anthropological Archives, Smithsonian Institution.
