= 9th Aero Squadron =

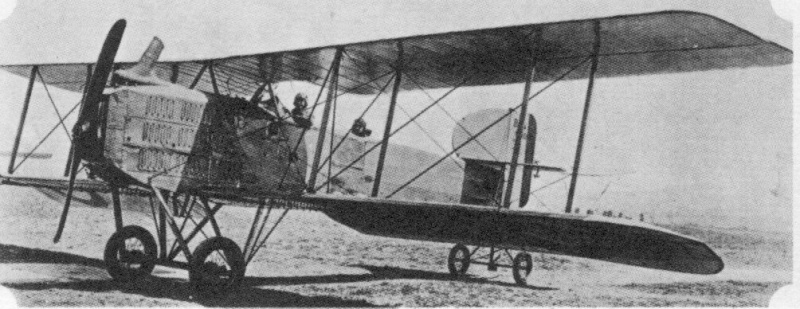
- French Breguet 14 B.2 bomber, the type used by the 9th Aero Squadron
- Active: 14 June 1917 – 22 July 1919
- Country: United States
- Branch: Air Service, United States Army
- Type: Squadron
- Role: Night Observation
- Part of: American Expeditionary Forces (AEF)
- Nickname(s): "Bats"
- Engagements: World War I Occupation of the Rhineland

Commanders
- Notable commanders: Capt. George E. A. Reinburg; Lt Samuel B. Eckert

Insignia
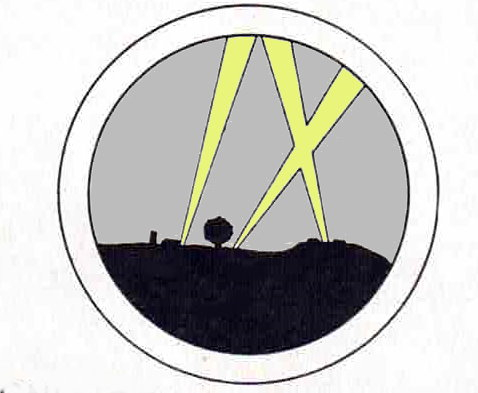
- 9th Aero Squadron Emblem

Aircraft flown
- Bomber: Breguet 14, 1918-1919, Royal Aircraft Factory F.E.2, 1918-1919
- Fighter: Sopwith Camel, 1917; Sopwith Scout, 1917
- Trainer: Curtiss JN-4, 1917

Service record
- Operations: First Army Observation Group; Western Front, France: 26 August-11 November 1918: Sorties: 381; Combat missions: 38; Enemy combats: Unrecorded; Killed: 1 Pilot, 2 Observers; Wounded: 4 Pilots, 1 Observer; Missing: 0; Aircraft lost: 12

The 9th Aero Squadron was an Air Service, United States Army unit that fought on the Western Front during World War I.

The squadron was assigned as an Army Observation Squadron, performing long-range, strategic night reconnaissance over the entire length of the United States First Army sector of the Western Front in France. It was the only night reconnaissance squadron of the Air Service stationed on the Western Front, and the squadron's emblem reflects an aircraft, flying at night with searchlights searching for it in a IX pattern.

After the 1918 Armistice with Germany, the squadron was assigned to the United States Third Army as part of the Occupation of the Rhineland in Germany. It returned to the United States in June 1919 and became part of the permanent United States Army Air Service in 1921, being re-designated as the 9th Squadron (Observation).

The current United States Air Force unit which holds its lineage and history is the 9th Bomb Squadron, assigned to the 7th Operations Group, Dyess Air Force Base, Texas.

== History ==
=== Origins ===
The 9th Bomb Squadron origins begin on 30 May 1917, when Company E, Provisional Aviation School Squadron at Kelly Field, San Antonio Texas was designated as a separate unit. The men, who had been in training for about a month, were officially designated as the 9th Aero Squadron on 14 June. On 5 July, the squadron was ordered to a new airfield at Mt. Clemens, Michigan, where, with the 8th Aero Squadron, opened what became known as Selfridge Field. At Selfridge, the men of the 9th assembled a Curtiss JN-4 Jenny, the first airplane to ever fly there. The airfield was still mostly pasture land, and construction of accommodations were underway for 150 aircraft at the field. The airfield was gearing up to train men in flying, bombing, radio and photography for the war effort. During the summer of 1917, 72 men won aviator ratings and logged over 3,700 flying hours.

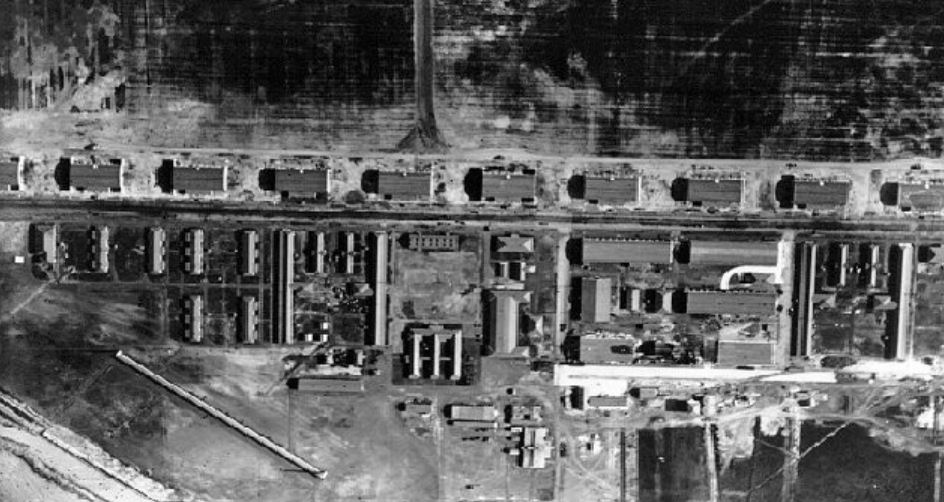
Selfridge Field, Michigan - 14 June 1918. Taken from an altitude of 3,500 feet.

On 27 October, the squadron was ordered to Mineola Field, Mineola, Long Island, New York to prepare for overseas service. It sailed from Halifax, Nova Scotia on 27 November 1917 and made an unremarkable voyage to Liverpool, England, arriving on 7 December. After disembarking, the squadron was marched from the docks to the Liverpool railway station where it boarded a London and North Western Railway train which took them to Winchester, on the south coast of England. Upon arrival, the squadron was moved to the Romsey Rest Camp.

At Romsey, the squadron was ordered for six months training in England under the Royal Flying Corps. It was split up into four flights. Flight "A" was sent to South Charleton in Devon for training on Sopwith Camel fighters; Flight "B" to Scampton, Lincolnshire for training on Sopwith Pup scout aircraft; Flight "C" to Spitalgate, near Grantham, Lincolnshire for observation training and Flight "D" to Harlaxton, Lincolnshire for motor mechanic instruction. In February 1918, the squadron was re-assembled at Spitalgate and shortly afterwards it took over the work of 12 Group, 24th Wing, Royal Flying Corps, becoming the first American squadron to be assigned to duty with a British Flight, however it was commanded by a British RFC officer at the time.

On 7 August 1918, the squadron left Spitalgate and travelled to Southampton where it embarked on a cross-channel ferry to Le Havre, Upper Normandy, France, arriving on 13 August. On 16 August, it arrived at Air Service Replacement Concentration Barracks, St. Maixent, which was the primary reception center for new units assigned to American Expeditionary Forces. There the 9th was organised for night flying and reconnaissance duties, the first US squadron to do so. Night reconnaissance had been tried with indifferent success by the French and with fairly good results by the British. Replacements of enlisted personnel were made and on 23 August the squadron arrived at the 1st Air Depot, Colombey-les-Belles Airdrome, where the squadron was fully equipped with all manner of supplies and equipment. At Colombey, the squadron was equipped with French Breguet 14A2 reconnaissance aircraft equipped with a camera, with some carrying radios. Poor equipment was issued to the squadron at the beginning of operations, part of the flares and landing lights being condemned products from other armies. The equipment was speedily gotten rid of by the squadron which had complained to the Supply Depot and better equipment was secured.

An effort was made to secure experienced pilots and observers from older squadrons, but this proved impractical. New pilots with little night flying and observers with no night experience were received by the squadron. These men had to be trained in night work before they could begin operations over the lines. This obstacle in conjunction with bad night weather, was responsible for the slow start of the squadron. The 9th was then assigned to the 1st Army Observation Group, Air Service, First Army, and transferred to the Headquarters, Night Reconnaissance Bombing Group at Amanty Airdrome in the Toul Sector.

==== Combat Operations ====
At Amaty, the first patrol was made over the lines on the night of 14 September 1918. Regular flights were made thereafter. "A" Flight would be on duty from dark until 01:00; "B" Flight from 01:00 until dawn each night. Flying was between 700 and 1200 meters altitude. Operations orders were issued each day for the nightly operations, taking off at staggered times. To reduce visibility of the aircraft when performing night missions aircraft were painted in black. Operations orders delineated the areas to be flown over by each sortie. During each mission, the observers would look for railroad activity with trains moving; road convoys; lighted areas indicating troop concentrations; locations of anti-aircraft artillery and searchlights, carefully noting their locations. Not all missions were successful, as weather would interfere with observations, and night fogs would cover the ground, making observations impossible.

As the war progressed the unit participated in many night missions and battles. Most famous of those battles were the Battle of Lorraine, Battle of Saint-Mihiel, and the Meuse-Argonne Offensive. For those, the unit earned their first battle streamers. The flying of night reconnaissance was a learning effort, as well as an operational necessity. The squadron history is replete with notes such as the following:

"..On a full moonlight night or an approximately full moonlight night observation is easy and can be carried on from a height of from 1,000 to 1,500 meters. Artificial flares are not necessary unless very detailed information is required when a lower altitude becomes necessary..."
"..When enemy search lights are sweeping the sky searching for one, it is best to refrain from shooting till they actually find and hold the light on the plane, for the tracer bullets are an aid to the searchers in locating the fliers position. As soon, however, as ones position is discovered the use of quick, well directed machine gun fire will greatly disturb the men directing the light and aid the pilot in eluding the trap.."
"..In shooting up a train load of troops or motor transports, one should drop to a level of three hundred meters or lower, and rake the train in a longitudinal manner. Good coordination between the pilot and observer is essential as the machine (aircraft) should be flown slowly, straight and as nearly as possible in a direction parallel to the movement of the target to get the best results.."

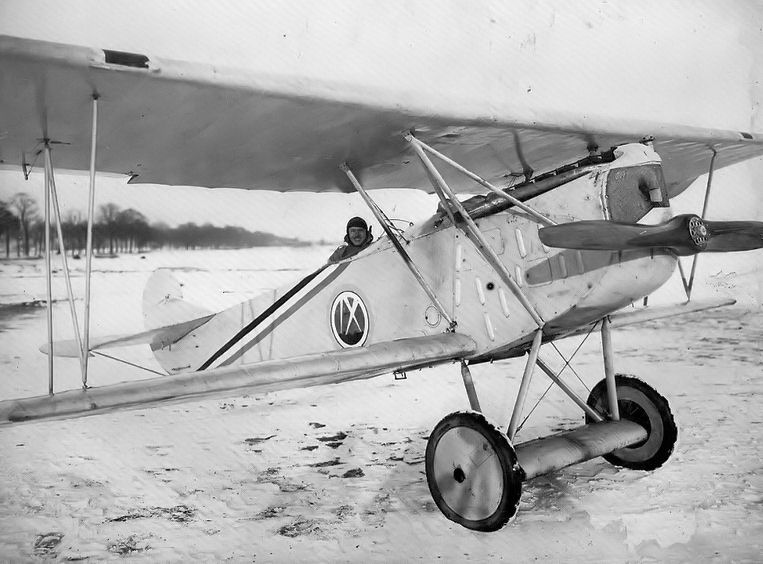
9th Aero Squadron – evaluating a captured Fokker D.VII, Trier Airdrome, Germany, winter 1918–1919.

On 24 September, the squadron was moved north from Amaty to Vavincourt Aerodrome. Night reconnaissance flights were performed during the Meuse-Argonne offensive as weather conditions permitted. On 24 September an attack was made on squadron aircraft by two enemy chase planes. The planes were not identified until they were less than 100 meters away. The forward aircraft was firing when it was first observed. By diving rapidly, first to the right, then to the left, the 9th squadron aircraft escaped, although the two enemy planes were seen several hundred meters above searching. Four days later information was received from the Intelligence Department that a night reconnaissance flight had been identified on one of the enemy airdromes. Although the planes of our Allies were attacked three times after this incident, the planes of the 9th met no further resistance in the air. The squadron remained at Vavincourt until the armistice on 11 November.

==== Third Army of occupation ====
After the war had drawn to a close, the unit was moved Germany to serve as part of the occupation force of the Rhineland under the Third Army Air Service. The 9th was initially assigned as a courier squadron for Headquarters Third Army, flying from Coblenz Aerodrome. The squadron was also able to perform test flights on surrendered German aircraft. Flights of the Fokker D.VII, Pfalz D.XII, Halberstadts and Rumpler aircraft were made and evaluations were made.

On 15 April 1919, the 9th was reassigned to the VII Corps Observation Group at Trier Aerodrome, where it became part of the infantry liaison school where it assisted in the training of infantry units to work with Air Service units and vice versa.

On 12 May 1919, the squadron first went to the 1st Air Depot at Colombey-les-Belles Airdrome, to turn in all of its supplies and equipment and was relieved from duty with the AEF. The squadron's Breguet aircraft were delivered to the Air Service American Air Service Acceptance Park No. 1 at Orly Aerodrome to be returned to the French. There practically all of the pilots and observers were detached from the squadron.

Personnel were subsequently assigned to the commanding general, services of supply, and ordered to report to the Marseille staging camp. There, personnel awaited scheduling for transport to the United States. Upon return to the US, most squadron personnel were demobilized at Mitchell Field, New York.

=== Lineage ===
- Organized as 9th Aero Squadron on 14 June 1917

Re-designated: 9th Aero Squadron (Night Observation), 30 August 1918
Re-designated: 9th Aero Squadron (Corps Observation), 15 April 1919
Re-designated: 9th Corps Observation Squadron, 22 July 1919

=== Assignments ===
- Post Headquarters, Camp Kelly, 14 June-8 July 1917
- Post Headquarters, Camp Selfridge, 8 July-28 October 1917
- Air Service Headquarters, AEF, British Isles, 28 October 1917 – 16 August 1918

Attached to the Royal Flying Corps for training, 7 December 1917 – 16 August 1918

- Replacement Concentration Center, AEF, 16–23 August 1918
- 1st Air Depot, AEF, 23–28 August 1918
- First Army Observation Group, 30 August 1918
- Third Army Air Service, 21 November 1918
- VII Corps Observation Group, 15 April 1919
- 1st Air Depot, AEF, 18–25 May 1919
- Commanding General, Services of Supply, 25 May-7 June 1919
- Post Headquarters, Mitchell Field, 8 June 1919
- Post Headquarters, Park Field, 12 July 1919
- Western Department, 22 July 1919

=== Stations ===
- Camp Kelly, Texas, 14 June 1917
- Selfridge Field, Michigan, 8 July 1917
- Mineola Field, Mineola, Long Island, 28 October 1917
- Port of Entry, Hoboken, New Jersey

Trans-Atlantic crossing: 27 November-7 December 1917

- Liverpool, England, 7 December
- Romsey Rest Camp, Winchester, England, 7 December

Squadron separated into flights for training with RFC

"A" Flight: South Charleton Aerodrome, Devon
"B" Flight: Scampton Aerodrome, Lincolnshire
"C" Flight: Spittlegate Aerodrome, Lincolnshire
"D" Flight: Harlaxton Aerodrome, Lincolnshire

Re-assembled at Spittlegate Aerodrome, Lincolnshire, February, 1918

- Southampton, England, 7 August 1918
- Le Havre, France, 13 August 1918
- St. Maixent Replacement Barracks, France, 16 August 1918
- Colombey-les-Belles Airdrome, France, 23 August 1918
- Amanty Airdrome, 28 August 1918
- Vavincourt Aerodrome, France, 24 September 1918
- Preutin, France, 21 November 1918
- Trier Aerodrome, 5 December 1918
- Coblenz Aerodrome, Germany, c. 16 December 1918
- Trier Aerodrome, 15 April 1919
- Colombey-les-Belles Airdrome, France, 18 May 1919
- Marseille, France, 25 May-7 Jun 1919
- Park Field, Tennessee, 12 July 1919
- March Field, California, 22 July 1919

=== Enemy aircraft flown for evaluation ===
- LVG C.VI (1919)
- Fokker D.VII (1919)
- Pfalz D.XII (1919)
- DFW C.V (1919)
- Halberstadt CL.IV (1919)
- Halberstadt C.V (1919)
- Rumpler C.I (1919)
- Hannover CL.III (1919)

=== Combat sectors and campaigns ===
Streamer	Sector/Campaign	Dates	Notes
	Toul Sector	30 August-11 September 1918	
	St. Mihiel Offensive Campaign	12–16 September 1918	
	Meuse-Argonne Offensive Campaign	26 September-11 November 1918	

=== Notable personnel ===
- Lt. Dache M. Reeves, Distinguished Service Cross, Silver Star Citation

== See also ==
- Organization of the Air Service of the American Expeditionary Force
- List of American Aero Squadrons
