= Pyramid Island =

Kenyan island

- Interactive map of Pyramid Island

Geography
- Location: Lake Victoria
- Coordinates: 0.901944°S 33.939444°E
- Area: 0.510 km^{2} (0.197 sq mi)
- Coastline: 3.00 km (1.864 mi)

Administration
- Kenya
- County: Migori

Additional information
- Time zone: EAT (UTC+3)

Pyramid Island is a Kenyan island whose westernmost point is used to demarcate the border between Kenya and Uganda just north of the 1st degree south parallel in Lake Victoria. It is located close to two adjacent islands, Migingo Island and Usingo Island. Pyramid and Usingo are steep and have either limited or no human habitation. The Kenya—Uganda border was delineated by order of the Kenya Colony and Protectorate (Boundaries Order in Council 1926).

The other islands associated with the boundary of Uganda and Kenya in Lake Victoria include Sumba, Mageta, Kiringiti, and Ilemba Islands, as shown in surveys conducted by the Colonial Office held in the United Kingdom's National Archives. The documents above state that the boundary of Uganda runs from the mouth of River Sio in a straight line south-westerly to the most northerly point of Sumba. It continues by the western and south-western shores of the island to its most southerly point before following a straight line south-easterly to the most westerly point of Mageta Island. From there it follows a straight line southerly to the most western point of Kiringiti Island, thence follows a straight line southerly to the most western point of Ilemba Island before following a straight line southerly again to the westernmost point of Pyramid Island and continuing in a straight line due south to a point on Latitude 1 south.
