= Awendo Constituency =

Awendo
- constituency for the Parliament of Kenya
- Awendo Constituency within Migori County

- Migori County within Kenya
- County: Migori
- Population: 117,290
- Area: 255 km^{2} (98.5 sq mi)

Current constituency
- Number of members: 1
- Party: ODM
- Member of Parliament: John Owino
- Wards: 4

Awendo is a constituency in Kenya which elects one member to the Kenya National Assembly. It is one of eight constituencies in Migori County.

The Awendo Constituency borders South Mugirango in the East on a narrow landscape located around Kitunja and Nyamaiya. It has a long borderline with Kilgoris constituency in Trans-Mara district. Its border with Uriri constituency in the South stretches all the way from Oyani - Masai to Agongo and Pala, where it is linked to Ndhiwa Constituency to the West. It has another borderline with Rongo Constituency, which runs from Kadera Kuoyo through Kuja River, serving as the natural boundary between Kamagambo South and Sakwa North Location, passing through Sakwa East, and ending up around the Maroo Market and Kitunja area.

== MPs ==
- John Owino
