= Migori Constituency =

Kenyan electoral constituency

Migori was an electoral constituency in Kenya. It was one of eight constituencies of Migori County. The constituency was established for the 1963 elections. In 2013, the constituency was divided into Suna West and Suna East.

== Members of Parliament ==
Elections	MP	Party	Notes
1963	John Henry Okwanyo	KANU	One-party system
1969	Lawrence J. Oguda	KANU	One-party system
1974	John Henry Okwanyo	KANU	One-party system
1979	John Henry Okwanyo	KANU	One-party system
1983	Simeon Misiani Gor	KANU	One-party system.
1988	John Henry Okwanyo	KANU	One-party system.
1992	George Owino Achola	Ford-Kenya	
1997	George Owino Achola	NDP	
2002	Charles Oyugi Owino	NARC	
2007	John Pesa Dache	ODM	
2013	Junnet Mohamed	ODM	

== Wards ==
Ward	Registered Voters	Local Authority
Kadika	1,314	Migori municipality
Milimani	1,676	Migori municipality
Ngege	2,104	Migori municipality
Nyasare	3,429	Migori municipality
Oruba	4,707	Migori municipality
Ragana	4,195	Migori municipality
Giribe	4,990	Migori county
God Jope	5,565	Migori county
Kakrao	6,516	Migori county
Kwa	4,281	Migori county
Mukuro	6,583	Migori county
Nyabisawa	7,133	Migori county
Total	52,493	
*September 2005.
