= Aneko =

- Location within Kenya
- Coordinates: 0.95°S 34.15°E
- Country: Kenya
- Province: Nyanza Province
- Time zone: UTC+3 (EAT)

Aneko is a settlement in Kenya's Migori County.

== History ==
Before the Kenyan general election in 2013, Aneko voted as part of the Nyanza Province. It borders two rivers. River Kuja to the north, Migori to the south, and Lake Victoria to the west. It has a substantial fishing industry that has been affected by droughts and disputes around Migingo Island.
