= Irienyi people =

Irienyi
Total population
- 80,000 Kenya and Tanzania

Regions with significant populations
- Homa Bay, western KenyaGassi, Ngoe, Kaksingri, and Regi

Languages
- Ekirienyi, Swahili, and English

Religion
- Christianity, African Traditional Religion,

Related ethnic groups
- Other Kisii, Kuria, other Bantu peoples

Gwassi
- Person: Omwirienyi/Omugassi (singular)
- People: Abiirienyi
- Language: Ekirienyi/Ekigassi
- Country: Ekiaro kia Ugassi/Kaksingri

The Irienyi (also known as Abiirienyi) is a community of Bantu people who inhabit Gwassi district in Homa Bay County, Western Kenya. Gwassi is the common reference to their homeland.
