= John Henry Okwanyo =

Kenyan politician

Hon. (John) Henry Okwanyo
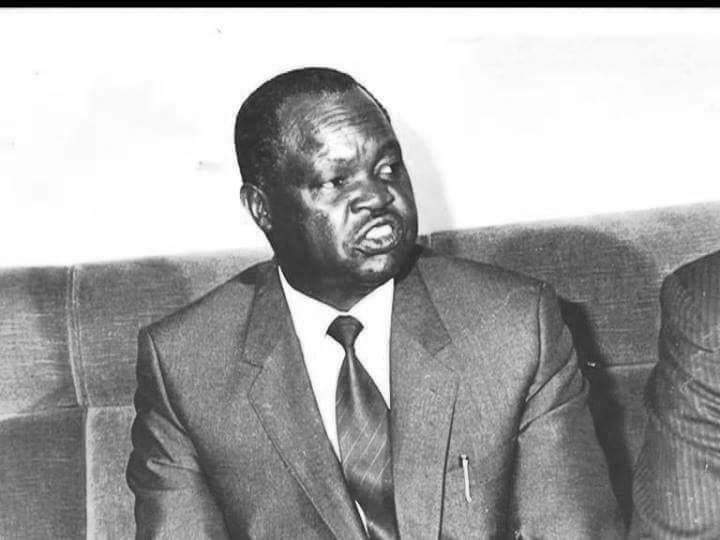

Minister of Energy, MP for Migori
- In office 1969–1992
- Succeeded by: Gilbert Kabere M'mbijiwe
- Constituency: Migori (Migori)

Member of Parliament
- In office 1963–1992

Personal details
- Born: John Okwanyo; 1928 Migori, Migori (Nyanza Kenya)
- Died: 5 December 1994 (aged 65–66) Nairobi, Kenya
- Resting place: Migori, Migori
- Citizenship: Kenya
- Party: Kenya African National Union (KANU)
- Children: 21: Peter Okwanyo; Gideon Onyango Mwai Kibaki; Mildred Okwanyo; Zablon Okwanyo; Milka Okwanyo; Nickson Okeyo Okwanyo; Mahalath Okwanyo; Martha Okwanyo; Mary Okwanyo; Hully Okwanyo; Belinda Okwanyo; Wycliffe Okwanyo; Brenda Abela Okwanyo; Hellen Okwanyo; Linet Okwanyo; Tom Okwanyo; Phares Okwanyo; Phillip Okwanyo; Tom Mboya Okwanyo; Joseph Stanley Mboya; Mike Odhiambo Okwanyo; Simon Omondi Okwanyo
- Education: Medical Training College
- Cabinet: Daniel arap Moi

John Henry Okwanyo was a politician from Kenya. He served in the government and cabinet of Daniel arap Moi, Kenya's second president, for many years. During this time, he held the post of member of parliament for the Larger Migori constituency (1963 – 1992) and the portfolios of Minister of Energy.

== Early life and education ==
Hon. Okwanyo was born in South Nyanza in 1928 and received his early education at Nyamome Primary, Kisii High School between 1946 and 1950 before joining the Medical Training Centre (MTC), Nairobi, where he qualified as a radiographer in 1953. His mother is Hellen Nyachieo who hails from Waswetta and Father Noah Biko a Jakatiga.

== Political career ==
Mr Okwanyo was first elected to Parliament in 1963 to represent Migori. He was appointed an Assistant Minister for Foreign affairs in 1969 and then as Minister of Commerce & Industry in 1979 before moving to head the Ministry of Energy from 1980 to 1982. Hon. John Okwanyo was a member of the World Anti-Communist League and he represented Kenya in the 12th conference held in Seoul, Korea.

== See also ==
- Migori Constituency
- List of ministers of Kenya
