= Ochilo Ayacko =

Incumbent Governor of Migori County

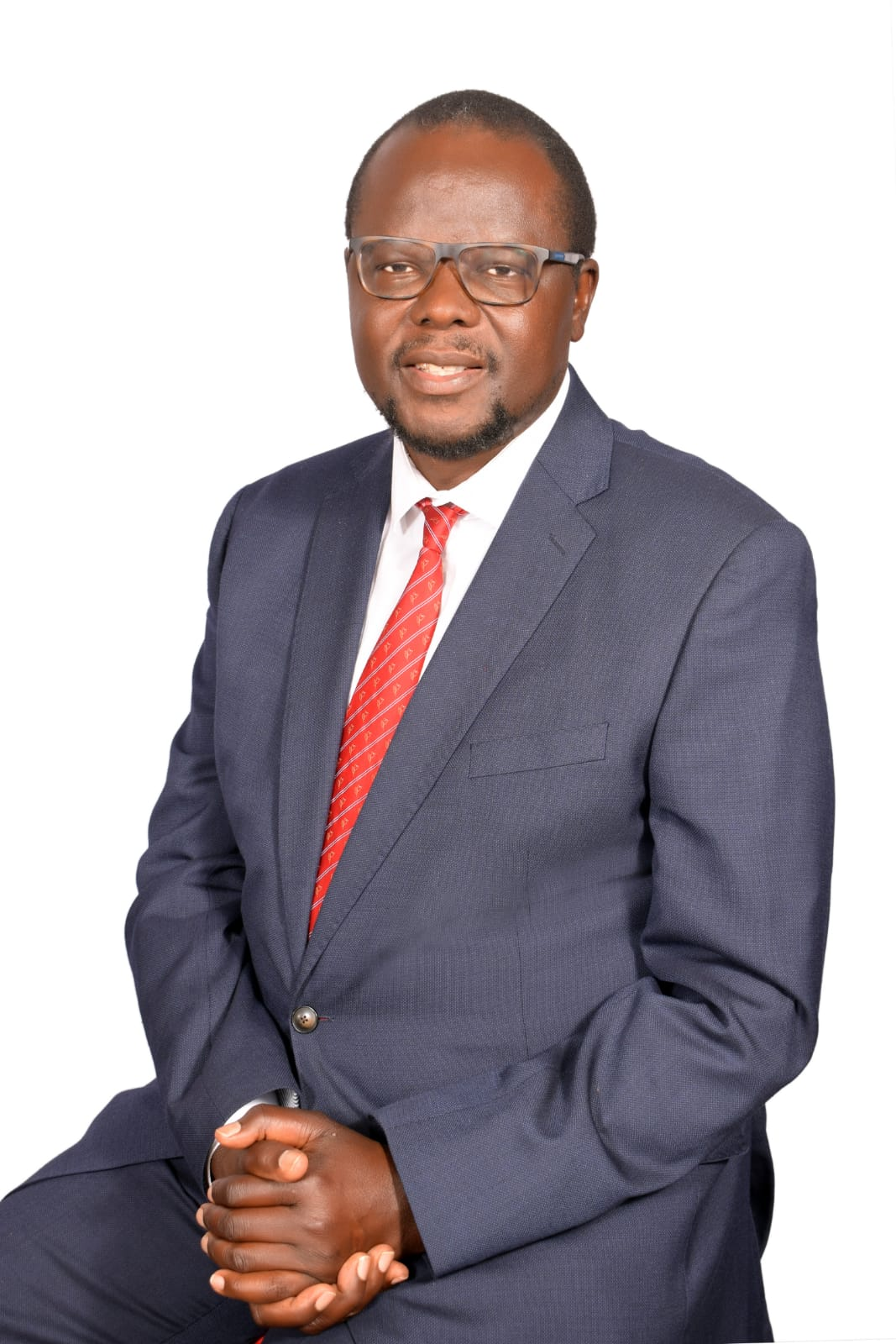
Ochilo Ayacko

Ochilo George Mbogo Ayacko (born 1968) is a Kenyan politician who has served as the governor of Migori County since August 2022. He is the current governor of Migori County.

He previously represented Migori County in the Senate of Kenya, beginning with the October 2018 by-election to replace Senator Ben Oluoch, who died in June 2018.

== History ==
Ayacko's political career began in 1997, when he was elected to the Parliament of Kenya, representing Rongo. He was re elected in 2002 and appointed to head the Ministry of Energy and later the ministry of Gender and Sports, where he helped create the first commissions and councils on gender, disability and youths, and pushed through the rural electrification programme under the late President Mwai Kibaki,

After being defeated in the 2007 Kenyan general election, Ayacko served as executive chairman and CEO of the Kenya Nuclear Electricity Board, and in 2015 was elected chair of the African Commission on Nuclear Energy.

In 2013 when members of the public approached him to vie as governor on the onset of devolution, he declined after ODM offered the mandate to Prof Edward Akong’o, who was defeated by outgoing Governor Okoth Obado on a PDP ticket.

In 2017, Ayacko ran for Governor of Migori County, but lost to Okoth Obado Ayacko made a legal challenge against Obado's victory, but this was dismissed by the Court of Appeal of Kenya. In 2018, Ayacko was listed as a nominee for an ambassadorial position; however, he declined this, on the basis that he wished to continue pursuing electoral politics. In October 2018 he was elected as the third senator for Migori county after a by election beating his closest challenger Eddy Oketch Gicheru.

In 2020, he became the vice chair of the senate committee on finance and budget. Ayacko was nominated by the Orange Democratic Movement as their preferred candidate for the Migori gubernatorial race, and subsequently won the election, defeating John Dache Pesa by 175,226 votes to 126,171.

== Education ==
He is a holder of a Bachelor of Laws degree (LL.B) and masters (LL.M) both from the University of Nairobi and also a Doctorate in Leadership & Change Management from the United States International University.
