= Rongo Constituency =

Kenyan constituency

Rongo
- constituency for the Parliament of Kenya
- Rongo Constituency within Migori County

- Migori County within Kenya
- County: Migori County
- Population: 124587
- Area: 213 km^{2} (82.2 sq mi)

Current constituency
- Number of members: 1
- Party: ODM
- Member of Parliament: Paul Abuor
- Wards: 4

Rongo is an electoral constituency in Kenya. It is one of the eight constituencies in Migori County. The constituency was established for the 1988 elections.

== Members of Parliament ==
Elections	MP	Party	Notes
1979 – 1988	Phares Oluoch Kanindo	KANU	One-party system.
1988	Dalmas Otieno	KANU	One-party system.
1992	John Linus Polo Aluoch	Ford-Kenya	
1997	George Mbogo Ochilo Ayacko	NDP	
2002	George Mbogo Ochilo Ayacko	NARC	
2007	Dalmas Otieno	ODM	
2013	Dalmas Otieno	ODM	
2017	Abuor Paul	ODM	
2022	Abuor Paul	ODM	

== Wards ==
Wards
Ward	Registered Voters	Local Authority
Central Kamagambo	6,991	Rongo town
East Kamagambo	5,373	Rongo town
North Kamagambo	8,332	Rongo town
South Kamagambo	4,661	Rongo town
West Kamagambo	6,707	Rongo town
South Sakwa	4,018	Awendo town
Central Sakwa	6,922	Awendo town
East Sakwa	7,730	Awendo town
North Sakwa	6,103	Awendo town
West Sakwa	5,946	Awendo town
Total	58,783	
*September 2005.
