= Kuria people =

Ethnic group from Mara Region of Tanzania

Kuria
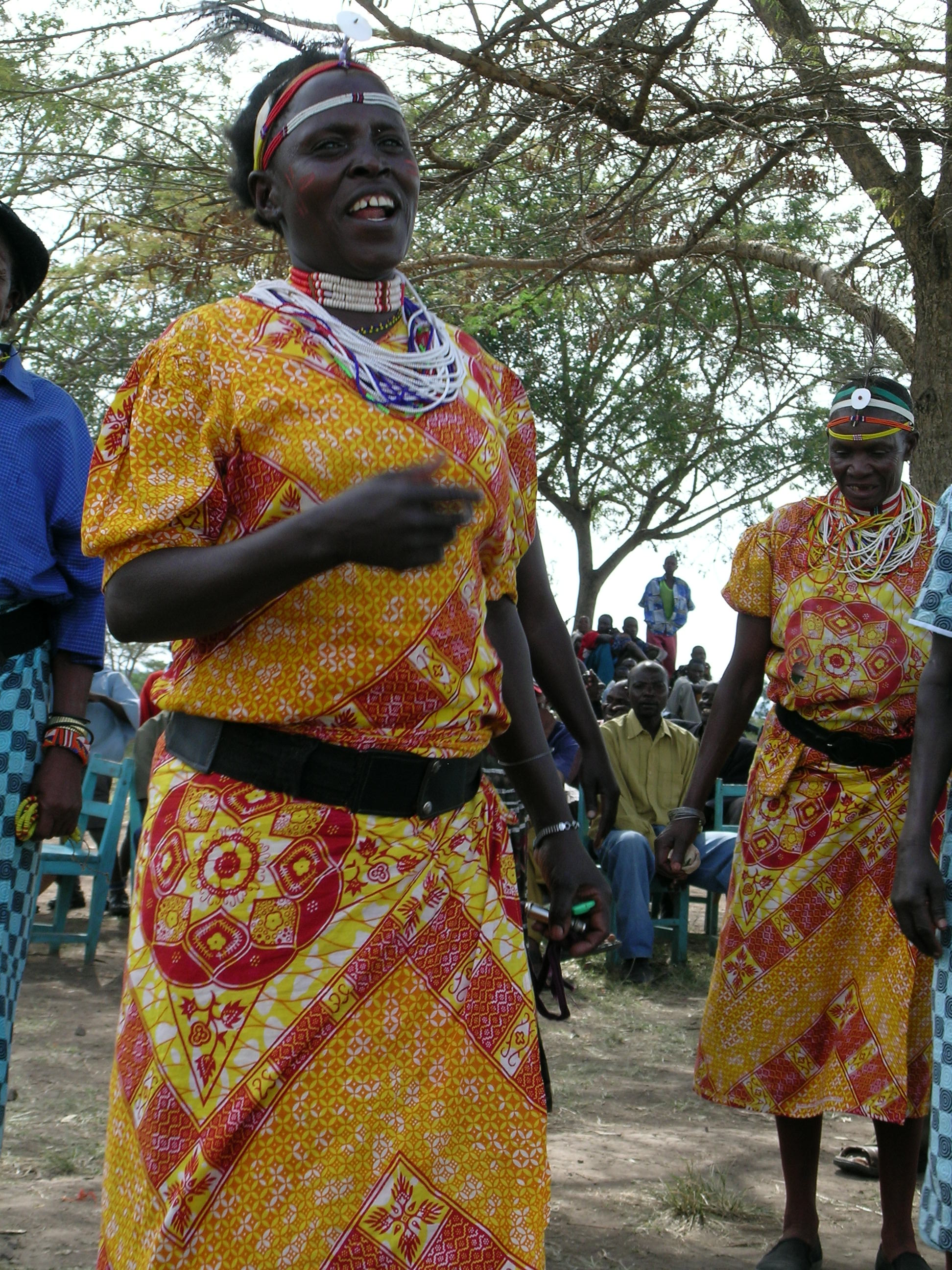

Total population
- 313,854 (in Kenya)

Regions with significant populations
- Tanzania, Kenya

Languages
- Kuria, Swahili and English

Religion
- Traditional religions, Christianity

Related ethnic groups
- Kisii, Luhya, other Bantu peoples

The Kuria people (also known as the AbaKuria, are a Bantu community in the Mara Region in Tanzania and southern Kenya. Their homeland is bounded on the east by the Migori River and on the west by the Mara River estuary. Traditionally a pastoral and farming community, the Kuria grow maize, beans and cassava as food crops and coffee and sweet potatoes as cash crops.

== Overview ==
River Migori-Kuria

The homeland of the Kuria is between the Migori River on the east and the Mara River estuary on the west, extending from Migori County in Kenya on the east to Musoma Rural District in Tanzania on the west. On the south, their land borders Transmara district in Kenya and the Nguruimi area of Tanzania. On the north is Lake Victoria, with a small corridor occupied by the Luo and other Bantu people.

The Kuria are found in Kenya and Tanzania. In Kenya, they live in the Kuria East (headquartered in Kegonga) and Kuria West districts (headquartered in Kehancha). In Tanzania, they live in Serengeti and Tarime Districts, Musoma Urban and Rural Districts, and Bunda District. The Kuria have recently settled in Tanzania's Mara Region.

Their neighbours are the Maasai, Kalenjin (the Kipsigis in western Transmara), Ikoma, Luo and Suba. The Kuria are divided into several clans, which live in Kenya and Tanzania. In Kenya, there are four clans: the Abagumbe, Abairege, Abanyabasi and Abakira. Tanzania has 13 (the Abhabhemba, Ababurati, Abakira, Abamera, Simbete, Abanyabasi, Watobori, Abakunta, Wiga, Kaboye, Abakenye, Abagumbe and Wasweta, Abatimbaru), in addition to other minor clans.

The Kuria are traditionally a farming community, primarily planting maize, beans and cassava as food crops. Cash crops include coffee,maize,sweet potatoes and Yams. The Kuria also keep cattle.

== Etymology, demographics and history ==
The name "Kuria" seems to have been applied to the whole group by early colonial chiefs, mainly to distinguish them from the other Luo peoples along the southern shore of Lake Victoria (who were known as Abasuba). According to major Kuria clan tradition (including the Abanyabasi, Abatimbaru, Abanyamongo, Abakira, Abairege, Abakenye, Abanchaari, and Abagumbe), their ancestor was Mokurya. His descendants migrated from Misiri(Egypt), and after many years of wandering along Lake Victoria they reached present-day Bukurya. According to this tradition, the Kuria have been divided into two families: the Abasai (from Mokurya's elder wife) and the Abachuma, from his younger wife.

In another view of the name's origin, between 1774 and 1858 Kuria people lived on Korea Hill (north of the Mara River in the Musoma district of present-day Tanzania). The region's inhabitants became known as "Korea people" after the hill, which evolved into "Kuria Hill". During the colonial period, the Kenyan Kuria called themselves Abatende (after the Abatende clan in the Bugumbe region); the Tanzanian Kuria continued to be known by their totems. Around the 1950s, the name Kuria gained wide usage. Mijikenda, Abaluyia and Kalenjin also became generally accepted as ethnic names during the 1940s and 1950s, when they sought political recognition from Kenyan colonial authorities.

The Kuria people may not have a common origin, although a number of clans claim to have come from Egypt. Kurian culture is an amalgam of several heterogeneous cultures. Among the Kuria are people who were originally from the Kalenjin-, Maasai-, Bantu- and Luo-speaking communities. Between AD 1400 and 1800, during migrations into Bukurya, the foundation was laid for Kuria cultural and political development. Early inhabitants of Bukurya were Bantu and Nilotic speakers, who brought their distinct cultures; the predominantly agricultural Bantu came into contact with Nilotic pastoralists. This combined agriculture and pastoralism, with nomadic tendencies. Kuria agriculture resembles that of the Abagusii and Luo, and their cattle-keeping has borrowed practices from the Maasai, Zanaki and Nguruimi.

Before the mass mobilization during the Uganda–Tanzania War (1978–1979), though the Kuria were only about 1% of Tanzania's population, they made up over 50% of its soldiers (then-President Julius Nyerere was from that tribe). Following the power and plunder of war, their postwar return to comparatively humble civilian life—heavily armed—led to crime, inter-communal violence, and power shifts. In particular, it exacerbated the widespread, longstanding Kuria tradition of cattle thefts and raids, which, in modern times, has expanded into widespread, intense, organized and commercial criminal activity—and concurrent vigilantism.

The 2024 Kuria population was estimated at 1,500,000, with 608,000 living in Tanzania and 892,000 in Kenya. Anthropological research in 2024 estimated the population of the Kuria in Kenya at about 900,000, and the Tanzanian population at about 700,000.

== Culture ==
=== Sexuality ===
Kuria women have sometimes married other women for reproductive, economic, or diplomatic reasons.

=== Circumcision ===
Culturally, the Kuria people practice circumcision for both males and females until today considering modern practices.

=== Agriculture ===
The Kuria people were primarily pastoralists during the pre-colonial era. The Kenyan Kuria lean towards crop production, and the Tanzanian Kuria tend to lean more towards pastoralism.

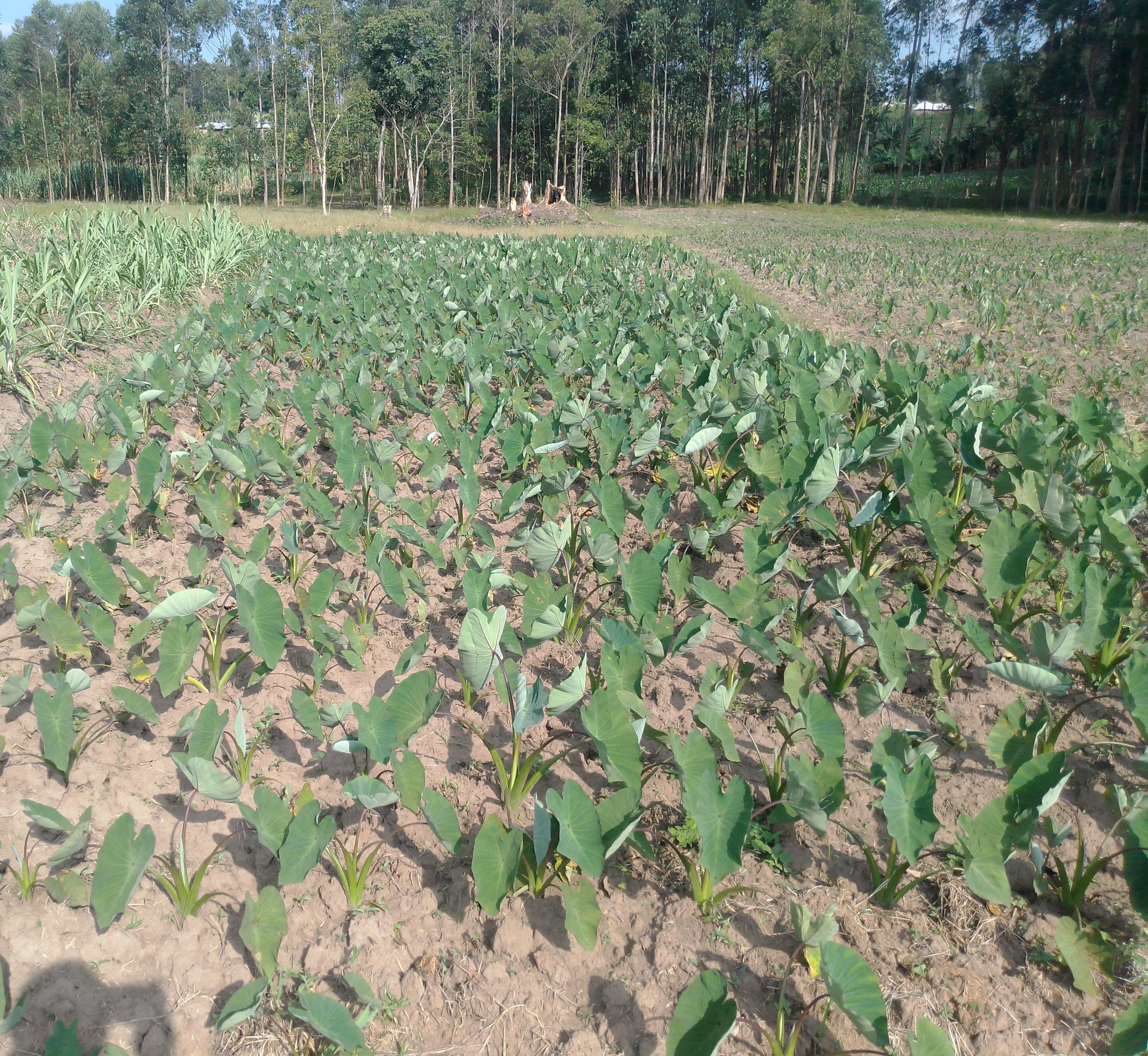
Arrow roots growing in Kuria East-Kenya

== Tools ==
Wooden tools
English	Kuria	Use
Stool	igitumbe	chair
Bed	obhoree	sleeping
Pestle	ihuri	thrashing millet, cassava
Bowl	igitubha	utensil
Hoe	inkuro	weeding and digging
Bow	obhotha	weapon
Arrows	imigwi	weapon
Shoes	imityambwi	dancing

Woven-straw utensils
English	Kuria	Use
Storage basket	egetonga	storing flour
Harvest basket	irikanga	harvesting Millet
Serving basket	ekehe, ekegaro	serving food
Door shutter	egesaku	shutter
Granary	iritara	grain storage
Ornaments	obhogeka	worn by girls and women
Container	ekerandi, egesencho	serving water, milk
Straw	orokore	drinking beer

Leather, skin, and clothing products
English	Kuria	Use
Cowhide	iriho/irisakwa	bedding
Goat- or calfskin	egesero	clothing
Decorated cowhide or goatskin	engemaita, embotora	ceremonial women's clothing
Treated goatskin	igisiriti	girls' and women's clothing
Shredded skin	amacharya	worn by boys during initiation
Thong	urukini, irichi	tying cattle or firewood
Shield	ingubha	warfare
Hood, crown	ekondo	warfare

Pottery products
English	Kuria	Use
Water pot	esengo ya amanche	water storage
Milk pot	ikinyongo	milk storage
Ugali pot	inyakaruga	cooking cornmeal porridge
Smoking pipe	ighikwabhe	smoking tobacco
Flour pot	inyongo ya bhose	storing flour
Vegetable pot	iririghira	cooking

== Names ==
Animals or birds
Kuria	English
imburi	goat
eng'ombe	cow
egaini	bull
engoko/magoko	chicken
Wangwe	leopard
Wandui	lion
Nyanswi	fish
Itinyi	animal
Machage	zebra
Nchoka/waichoka	snake
Nguti	dove
Sariro	eagle
Mang’era	buffalo
Nyanchugu	elephant
Wankuru	tortoise
Kehengu	rock rabbit
Ngocho	parrot
Ng’wena	crocodile
Magige	locust
Kinyunyi	bird

Action or fortune
Kuria	English
Mokami	milkman
Motegandi/mohagachi	builder
Murimi	farmer
Nyantahe	fetch(ing) from container
Muya	beauty
Mohoni	salesman
Motongori	first harvester
Mtundi	food provider
Matinde	land tiler
Waitara	granary
Mataro/machera/mogendi	traveller
Moseti	hunter
Mbusiro	seeding grain

Clans or tribes
Kuria	English
Mwikabhe/Ikwabhe	Maasai
Mtatiro	Tatoga
Mogaya	Luo
Mgusuhi	Kisii
Umunyabasi	from Nyabasi
Mtimbaru	from Butimbaru

Mystical/abstract names
Kuria	English
Nyanokwe	God
Wainani	Jinni(ghost)
Mgosi	from the north
Wanyancha	from west/lake
Mirumbe	mist/fog
Sabure	god of the Wanchari
Melengali	sunlight
Nchota/nsato	mystical snake
Matiko/butiko	night
Ryoba/rioba	sun

Events
English	Kuria
Earthquake	ikirigiti
Lightning	enkobha
Rain	wambura/nyambura
Famine	wanchara/nyanchara
Harvest	magesa/mogesi
Flood	nyamanche

== Common words ==
Kuria	English
Amang'ana	general greeting
Mbuya ohoyere	How was your day?
Tang'a amanche ghakunywa	Can I have (drinking) water?
Nuuwe ngw'i	What is your name?
Omosani	friend
Omogheni	guest
Omokhebhara	a pagan
Umwitongo	a foreigner
Omosacha	male
Omokari	female
Umwisekhe	young lady
Umumura	young man
Karibhu	welcome
Okoreebhuya	thank you
Umurisia	uncircumcised male
Iritoka/Omotoka	car (from English "motorcar")
Isukhuuri	school (from English "school")

Kuria is related to the Gusii language.
