= Aloe lolwensis =

Conservation status
- Endangered (IUCN 3.1)
- CITES Appendix II

Scientific classification
- Kingdom: Plantae
- Clade: Tracheophytes
- Clade: Angiosperms
- Clade: Monocots
- Order: Asparagales
- Family: Asphodelaceae
- Subfamily: Asphodeloideae
- Genus: Aloe
- Species: A. lolwensis

Binomial name
- Aloe lolwensis L.E.Newton

Species of succulent plant native to Kenya and Uganda

Aloe lolwensis is a species of succulent plant in the genus Aloe. It is an endangered species native to the islands and surrounds of Lake Victoria in western Kenya and southern Uganda.

== Taxonomy and history ==
First collected as early as 1989, Aloe lolwensis was described by Leonard Eric Newton in 2001 based on specimens collected from Rusinga Island, an island on Lake Victoria in western Kenya. The specific epithet lolwensis is derived from Nam Lolwe, the Luo name for Lake Victoria, in reference to the type location. The description was published in volume 73 of the Cactus and Succulent Journal.

Initially known only from Kenya, this species would be discovered growing in southern Uganda, close to Lake Victoria, in 2008.

== Distribution and habitat ==
Aloe lolwensis grows on the islands and surrounding areas of Lake Victoria in Kenyan and Ugandan territory. In Kenya it is known from Rusinga Island, Mfangano Island, and Pyramid Island, while in Uganda it is known from Busia District. It grows in grasslands and rocky areas at altitudes of 1,220–1,550 m (4,000–5,090 ft) above sea level.

== Description ==
Aloe lolwensis is a relatively large Aloe, forming a compact rosette with upright leaves. It is a stemless species capable of reproducing by suckering to form dense clumps.

== Ecology ==
In Uganda, Aloe lolwensis is known to grow alongside and hybridise with A. dawei and A. wollastonii.

== Conservation status ==
Aloe lolwensis is listed as endangered on the International Union for the Conservation of Nature's Red List under criteria B1ab(i,ii,iii,iv,v) and B2ab(i,ii,iii,iv,v), based on its decreasing population and the few sites at which it occurs. The trade of this species is regulated under Appendix II of the CITES treaty.
