= Oluoch =

Oluoch is a surname. Notable people with this name include:

- Ben Oluoch (1963/1966–2018), Kenyan broadcaster and politician
- Boniface Oluoch (born 1986), Kenyan footballer
- Lucas Oluoch (born 1991), Kenyan cricketer
- Wycliffe Juma Oluoch (born 1980), Kenyan footballer
