= Abairegi =

Kurya tribe in East Africa

Abairegi (also Abhairege; Bairege) is one of the Kurya clans in the eastern part of Lake Nyanza (Victoria) in East Africa. They are east of the other Kurya in the Mara region of Tanzania and in Kenya west of the Nyanza Region.
