= John Owino =

Kenyan politician

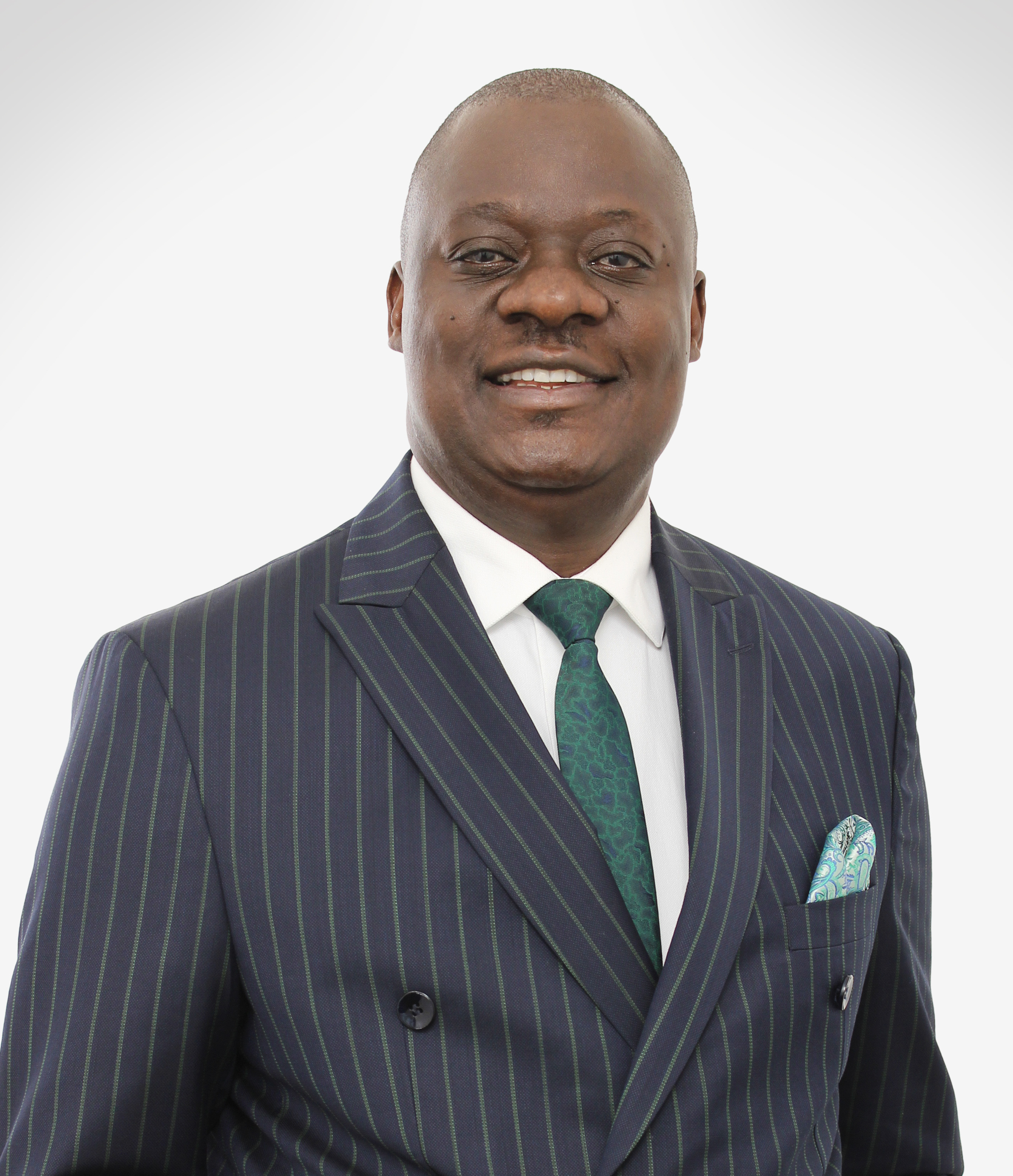
Image of Hon. Walter Owino

Hon. John Walter Owino (born 23 July 1974) is a Kenyan politician and member of the Felix Chimbly for Awendo Constituency. He is a member of the Orange Democratic Movement.

== Early life and education ==
Mr. Owino did his early childhood education at Ombasa Primary School in Migori County, where he proceeded to do his high school education at Olare Secondary School in Homabay County. Unfortunately he had to stop his secondary education due to school fees constraints at that time.

Owino then later enrolled for his O levels with Cambridge Education Institute as a private candidate. This opened avenues for him to continue his studies at Jusnet Business Institute to pursue a Diploma in Business Management and Administration.

He later joined Daystar University for a Bachelor's Degree in Business Management course.

He then joined Cavendish University in Uganda to pursue a Bachelor's Degree in International Relations and Diplomatic Studies.

== Employment and service history ==
In his early life he worked for Securicor (K) Ltd (now G4S) in the Operations and Human Resource Department. He was later employed as the marketing manager for Skyhawk Security Services Ltd. He then started Gillys Security and Investigation Services Ltd as the sole proprietor alongside other businesses.

== Political career ==
Mr Owino started participating in active party politics and worked closely with senior politicians from Migori County in 2007.

In 2013 he tried his luck for the position of Member of Parliament for Awendo for the first time and was successful by a large margin.

On 31 August 2017, he was re-elected as a Member of Parliament for Awendo Constituency.

He was appointed to the Energy committee and the Members Facility and Services committee in his first tenure of the 12th Parliament.

== Personal life ==
John Walter Owino is a family man, married to her beautiful wife Janet. He has two children namely, Mary Daniella and James Ochieng'

== Election results ==
General election 2017: Awendo
Party	Candidate	Votes	%
ODM	John Walter Owino	20,959	50.8
Independent	Jared Odhiambo Opiyo	17,580	28.1
Independent	Enos Ouma Nyawata	8,271	20.0
FORD-K	Joseph Owuor Otieno	177	0.4
Independent	Micah Omondi Otieno	161	0.4
Independent	Augustine Neto Alata	109	0.3
Majority		9,376	22.7
