= Kuria East Constituency =

Kuria East
- constituency for the Parliament of Kenya
- Kuria East Constituency within Migori County

- Migori County within Kenya
- County: Migori
- Population: 96,872
- Area: 188 km^{2} (72.6 sq mi)

Current constituency
- Number of members: 1
- Party: UDA
- Member of Parliament: Marwa Kitayama
- Wards: 5

Kuria East is a constituency in Kenya. It is one of eight constituencies in Migori County.
