= Usingo Island =

Small lake island in Kenya

- Interactive map of Usingo Island

Geography
- Location: Lake Victoria
- Coordinates: 0°52′57″S 33°56′31″E
- Total islands: 1

Usingo Island (Kisiwa cha Usingo) is a small lake island in Kenya, which is located in Migori County, in Lake Victoria.

== Geography ==
This island is still largely uninhabited, unlike its neighbour, the densely populated Migingo Island. Only one family lives on the island in recent periods due to the overpopulation of the neighboring island of Migingo and the lack of space for agriculture and livestock. The island is home to goats and white herons.

== See also ==
- Migingo Island
- Pyramid Island
- Geography of Kenya
