= Ben Oluoch =

Kenyan politician and broadcaster (died 2018)

Ben Okello Oluoch, also known as Ben Oluoch Okello and B.O.O., (1963 or 1966 in Rongo, Kenya — June 19, 2018, in Nairobi), was a Kenyan radio presenter and politician who represented Migori County in the Senate of Kenya from 2017 to 2018.

== Broadcasting career ==
In 1983, Oluoch studied journalism at the Kenya Institute of Mass Communication in South B. He earned a bachelor's degree in radio broadcasting from the University of Nairobi in 2013, and at the time of his death was pursuing a master's degree.

In 1988, he began working at the Kenya Broadcasting Corporation. In 2003, he left the KBC for Royal Media Service's Ramogi-FM, where he hosted a 5-hour morning program, Kogwen gi BOO (Luo for "Early morning with BOO"). He continued as a broadcaster until 2017.

== Political career ==
In the 2017 Kenyan general election, Oluoch represented the Orange Democratic Movement, and succeeded Wilfred Machage.

As a Senator, Oluoch served on multiple committees, including Health; Agriculture, Livestock, and Fisheries; and National Cohesion, Equal Opportunity and Regional Integration. However, his activity was limited, as he began experiencing health problems shortly after being sworn in, and "spen(t) most of the time in and out of hospital, away from his work station".

== Personal life ==
In March 2018, Oluoch responded to online rumors of his death by stating that, despite his recent ailments, he was "still as fit as a fiddle"; he also threatened legal action against those involved. In June 2018, he died of throat cancer.

Oluoch was a polygamist, and had four wives (of whom two survived him) and at least 25 children. He was also an Adventist.
