= Phares Oluoch Kanindo =

Phares Oluoch Kanindo (29 November 1942 – 24 May 2014) was a veteran politician in Kenya. He served as a member of parliament from 1979 to 1988, when the then president Moi prorogued parliament after the attempted 1982 coup. This he served in the larger Homa Bay Constituency, now divided into two constituencies (Rongo and Rangwe)

During that time, Kanindo was appointed to serve in the then government as an Assistant Minister in the Ministry of Education.

Kanindo is the son of the late Andrea Anindo.

== Early life ==
Kanindo was born at the present Awendo District in Nyanza Province of Kenya to the late Andrea Anindo and Masella Ojowi Anindo. He attended primary schools, among them Manyatta, Lwala, Komolo-rume primary school. He then joined Koderobara and Pe-Hill Intermediate School, where he schooled together with the eldest son of Jaramogi Oginga Odinga, Oburu Odinga who is the immediate former Member of Parliament for Bondo Constituency and Assistant Minister of Finance, Republic of Kenya. Oburu is eldest brother to the former Prime Minister of the Republic of Kenya. He later joined Luule Secondary School in Kampala, Uganda.

Kanindo later got a scholarship to Czechoslovakia republic where he registered for technical practices, majoring in Diploma in Radio and Wireless Electronics between 1961 and 1963. During Kenyan Independence, 1963, Kanindo jetted back into the country.

He joined the Kenya News Agency as a technician on radio and wireless devices. Kanindo was one of the first staff members to start the newly registered Agency together with Ocholla Ogur former Legislator for Nyatike Constituency and Amollo Oduma, Otieno Ogango, Joseph Ogutu among others.

He later ventured in music, nationally by joining The EMI Group (Electric & Musical Industries Ltd.) where he served as the CEO in Kenya, under a proprietor, Graham Shepherd of EMI London, the son of the then speaker of the House of Lords in London.

He tried his political wave in 1974 General elections, where he opted for the Homa Bay Constituency seat. He came second, losing the elections narrowly to the late Achieng Alloyce, among the 12 candidates.

That same year, Kanindo formed his own company, POK Music Stores which he merged with EMI-International. With POK Music Stores, Kanindo produced large varieties of music which sold in the entire West and South Africa, the countries included, Ivory Coast, Zambia, Malawi, Ghana, Nigeria and even the Brooklyn of New York City and Soho Square in London. Among the prominent Kenyan artists who produced their music at POK Music Stores include the late Kenyan Benga Maestro Collela Mazee, Kawere Boys, Kalusi Band, Awino lawi among others. During his days, Kanindo was an ace music producer and at one time Congolese greats like Franco, Verkys Kiamuamgana, Mbilia Bel and Tabu Ley visited the home of Phares Oluoch Kanindo in Awendo, South Nyanza.

== Politics ==
In 1988, Kanindo stepped down in the political race to capture the Rongo parliamentary seat. The seat was later to be captured by former Minister for public service, Hon Dalmas Otieno.

Kanindo later joined South Nyanza Sugar Co. Ltd as executive chairman, a position he used to revive the falling sugar industry. Kanindo also enjoys good rapport with senior government officials, among them the former Prime Minister and current opposition leader Raila Odinga

== Political life ==
He joined parliament in 1979 as a member of parliament for Homa Bay Constituency, a position he served for two terms up to 1988. He was appointed to serve in the lucrative Ministry of Education as the Assistant Minister.

In 1988, he was appointed to serve as the Executive chairman for South Nyanza Sugar Co. Ltd, a position he used to transform the then upcoming Sugar Industry.

== Luo unity ==
After the death of Tom Mboya, the Luo community was left with no option, since Jaramogi was in the opposition. Kanindo however manoeuvred his way into the community, by joining hands with Ngengi Muigai to bring the community back to its feet. Kanindo and Ngengi Muigai led a delegation to Nakuru State House to visit the then president of Kenya, Mzee Jomo Kenyatta. The delegation was led by the then Luo Elder Ker. Mbuya Akoko and other elders. This did not succeed as planned, as Kenyatta died two weeks after their first attempt.
