= Kuria West Constituency =

Constituency in Migori County, Kenya

Kuria West
- constituency for the Parliament of Kenya
- Kuria West Constituency within Migori County

- Migori County within Kenya
- County: Migori
- Population: 208513
- Area: 396 km^{2} (152.9 sq mi)

Current constituency
- Number of members: 1
- Party: UDA
- Member of Parliament: Mathias Robi
- Wards: 7

Kuria West is a constituency in Kenya. It is one of eight constituencies in Migori County.
