= Rongabi =

Rongabi is a village in Migori, Kenya that covers approximately 50 square kilometers. It borders Nyanchabo village along Kehancha Road in Migori. The village is located between two streams, Irikoro and Mara. Mara forms a tributary of the Migori River. Other forms of drainage in the area are the Rongabi dam and swamps. Rongabi Swamp is the largest swamp dominating the area.

The people living in this village are of the Kurian community speak Igikuria. The village's population is estimated at 800 according to the 2009 census report. There is only one village school that serves as an educational center of the village to the primary level.

The main economic activity carried out in the village is farming. The primary cash crop grown is tobacco; other crops such as maize, beans, sweet potatoes, cassava, bananas, and vegetables are also grown, mainly for local consumption. Cattle-keeping also forms part of the economic activity of the people living in the area.

Some of the traditions carried out in the area includes male circumcision, traditional naming and marriage according to the customs of the Abakuria.
