= John Pesa Dache =

Kenyan politician

John Pesa Dache is a Kenyan politician. He belongs to the Orange Democratic Movement and was elected to represent the Migori Constituency in the National Assembly of Kenya in the Kenyan parliamentary election of 2007. Hon John Pesa is credited with initiating numerous development projects during his stint as Migori MP. He is considered a top contender for Migori County Governor to replace Governor Zachary Obado in 2022 where Ochilo ayacko is poised to vie on the ODM ticket.
