= Dalmas Otieno =

Kenyan politician (1945–2025)

Dalmas Otieno Anyango (19 April 1945 – 7 September 2025) was a Kenyan politician. He was first elected as the Member of Parliament for Rongo in 1988, serving as Minister for Industrialisation from 1988 to 1991, then later that year as Minister of Labour & Human Resource Development and as Minister of Transport from 1991 to 1996. Prior to the 2017 elections, Dalamas joined the ODM party of the main opposition candidate, Raila Odinga. He was then elected to the Rongo constituency seat for the party. During that time, there was a grand coalition government led by president Mwai Emilo Kibaki, and he was appointed minister for public services and works. He was re-elected in 2012. In 2014 he tried to create his own political outfit, named Kalausi, to oppose ODM and promote South Nyanza's politics, but was unsuccessful.

== Career ==
He joined the main opposition candidate in the 2007 presidential election Raila Odinga, successfully running for the Member of Parliament for Rongo. Following a violence-marred election and post-poll crisis, Odinga was appointed prime minister in April 2008 in a power-sharing deal with Mwai Kibaki, serving as Supervisor and Coordinator of a national unity coalition government. Dalmas was appointed the Minister of State for Public Service. In the 2013 Kenyan general election he retained his seat again. In 2014 Dalmas unsuccessfully tried to create his own political outfit named Kalausi ("whirlwind") to rival the ODM party as a quest to emancipate the people of South Nyanza. This saw him break ranks with most officials and members of the ODM party from the Luo Nyanza region which eventually culminated in his loss to his nemesis Paul Abuor in the ODM primaries in 2017. He later unsuccessfully vied for Rongo MP in 2017 as independent candidate. Most political analysts viewed him as an independent politician who made his own decisions without following any political tide or sycophancy. Dalmas also went by the nickname Wuod Bade dongo and Tiga ngute bor due to his tall stature.

Otieno was born in Colony and Protectorate of Kenya on 19 April 1945. He was educated at Strathmore School.

Otieno lost his son in 2008 after a helicopter landed on him in Canada. The son had gone to study at a university in Canada.

== Death ==
Otieno died on 7 September 2025, at the age of 80 due to Hyperglycemia.
