= Suna East Constituency =

Electoral constituency in Kenya

Suna East
- constituency for the Parliament of Kenya
- Suna East Constituency within Migori County

- Migori County within Kenya
- County: Migori
- Population: 122,674
- Area: 205 km^{2} (79.2 sq mi)

Current constituency
- Number of members: 1
- Party: ODM
- Member of Parliament: Junet Mohamed
- Wards: 4

Suna East is a constituency in Kenya. It is one of eight constituencies in Migori County. It was established in 2013 when Migori Constituency was divided into Suna West and Suna East.

== Members of Parliament ==
Election	MP	Party
2013	Junet Mohamed	Orange Democratic Movement
2017	Junet Mohamed	Orange Democratic Movement
