= Mukuro =

Mukuro (骸) is a fictional name that means corpse.

Mukuro may refer to:

- Mukuro (軀), a character in YuYu Hakusho
- Mukuro (骸), the re-animated zombie of Shikyoh in The Last Blade
- Mukuro, a character in Samurai Champloo
- Mukuro Gyoubu, a monster in Battle Raper 2
- Mukuro or Kenji, a character in Red Earth and Capcom Fighting Evolution
- Mukuro Rokudo (六道 骸), a character in Reborn!
- Mukuro Enjō (炎城 ムクロ), known as "Hunter Pace" in the English dub, a character in Yu-Gi-Oh! 5D's.
- Mukuro Ikusaba (戦刃 むくろ), a character in Danganronpa
- Mukuro, specifically the eponymous mecha piloted by the main character in "Kuromukuro"
- Nobume Imai, a character in Gin Tama whose original name was Mukuro (骸).
- Mukuro Hoshimiya (星宮 六喰), a character in the light novel series Date A Live.
