= Migori =

Town in Kenya

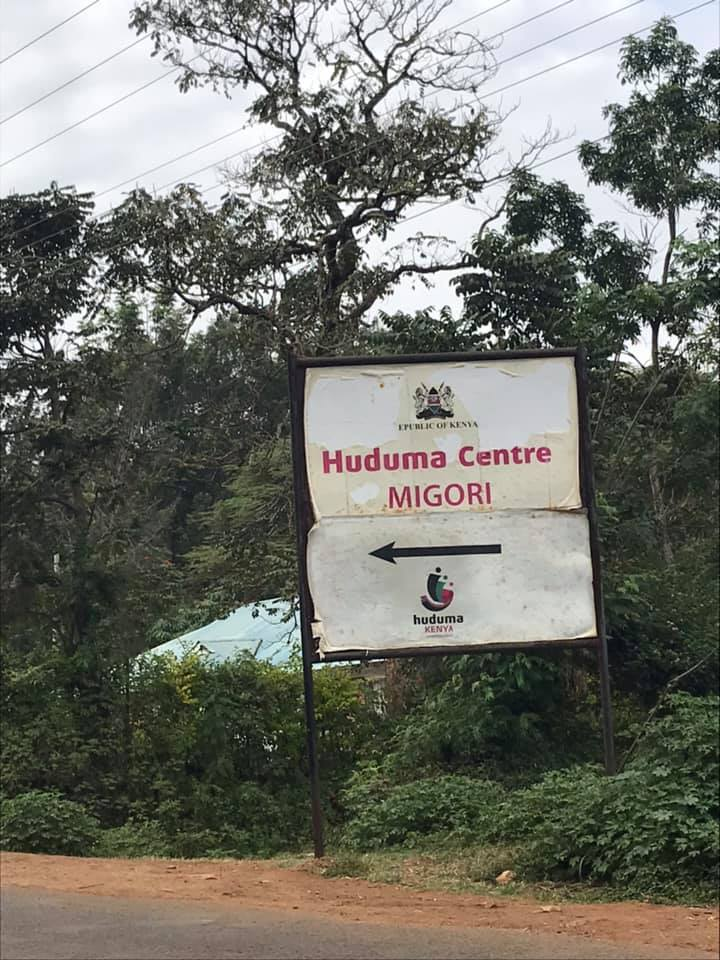

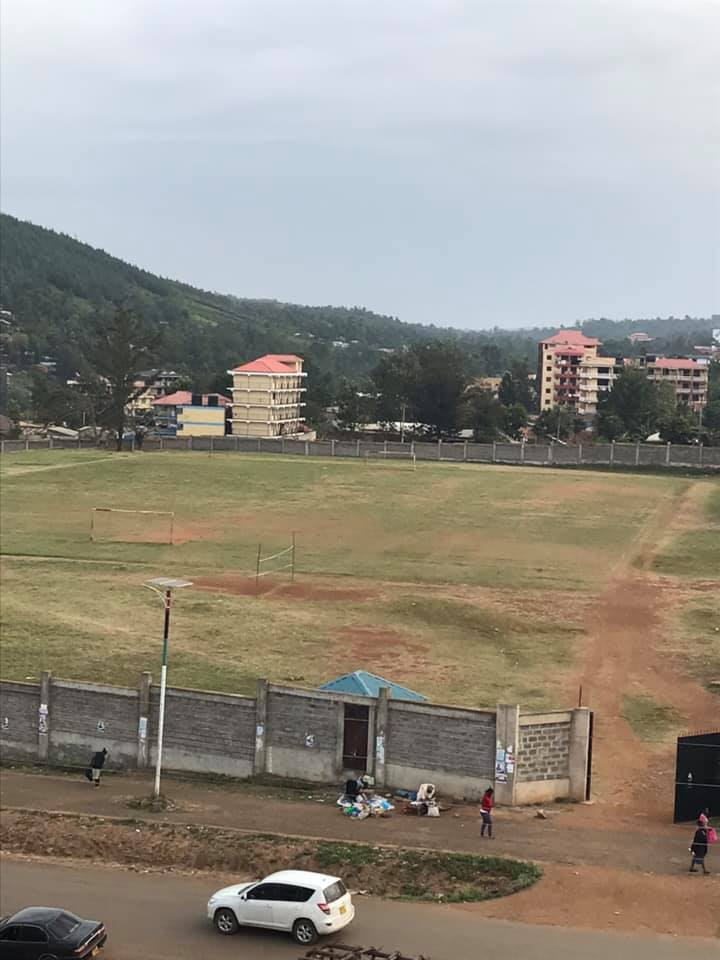
Migori Stadium

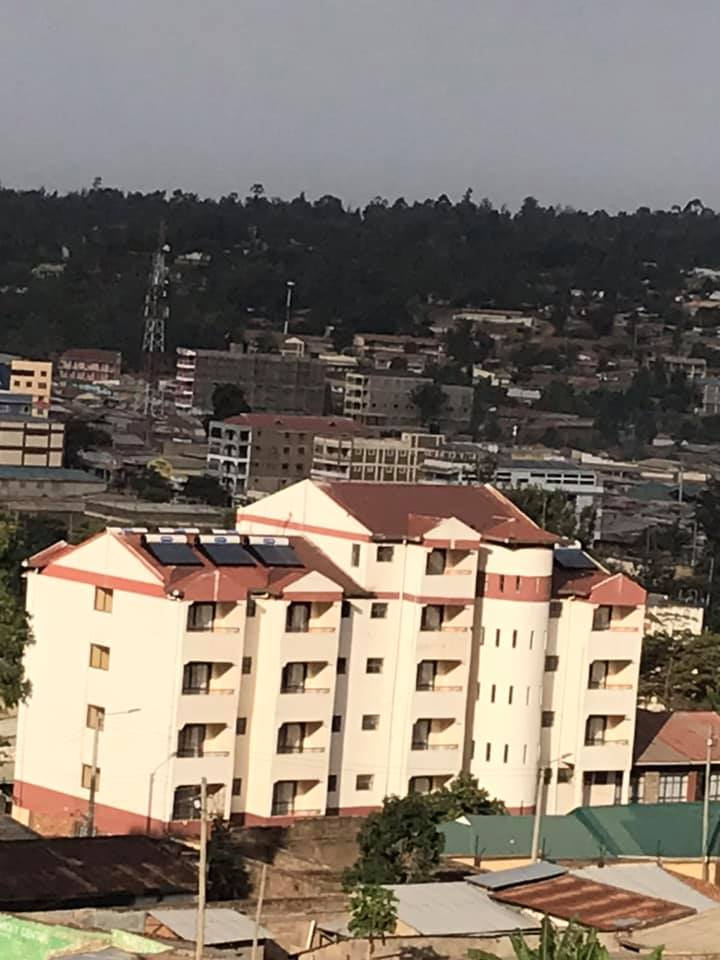
Migori skyline

Migori, also known as Suna-Migori, is a multi-ethnic municipal town which acts as the capital of Migori County, Kenya. The town is located 63 kilometers south of Kisii town and 22 km north of the Tanzanian border. The Migori Metropolitan area consists of Migori municipality and the adjacent smaller towns. The area has eight constituencies, namely Rongo, Awendo, Suna East, Suna West, Uriri, Nyatike, Kuria East and Kuria West with a total population of 393,012 according to the Kenya National Bureau of Statistics-sponsored national census of 2019. The neighboring town/constituency of Awendo had 96,872 and Kuria East (Sirare) had 117, 290. In 2010, The Star newspaper reported that the town had a population of approximately 100,000 people.

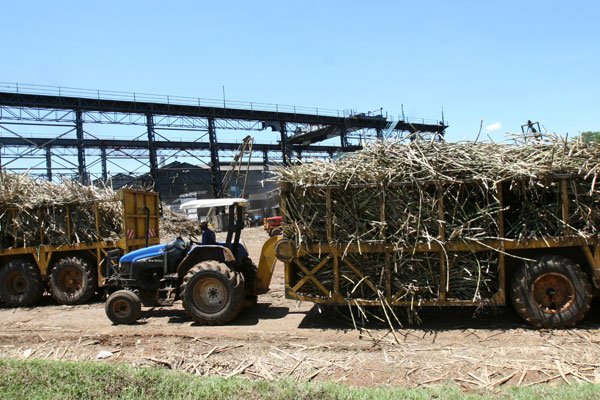

Migori is the second most viable urban center in Luo Nyanza after Kisumu city. However, it is the third largest town in former Nyanza province after Kisumu and Kisii. As compared to most Nyanza towns, Migori is unique because of its multi-ethnic makeup consisting of Dholuo-speaking people, Abasuba community, Abagusii, Abaluhya, Kuria, Indians, Arabs, and Somali people. Increasingly, there are also westerners living in the town engaged in mission activities as well as gold mining at Macalder Mines. Migori holds a special place geographically because of its close proximity to Uganda via Lake Victoria, through Migingo Island and its land and lake border with Tanzania at Isebania, Kehancha, Suba West at Kopanga and Kogaja Villages and Muhuru Bay. There are no records for the population of the municipality arising from the 2009 Kenya National Census. It is possible that the population of the town has increased due to the growth of the size of the urban sprawl and the 2010 Constitution which made Migori town the capital of Migori County bringing workers and an assortment in investments.

Once a small administrative center inhabited only by the native Suna people and adjudicated from the then South Nyanza District headquarters of Kisii and later on Homabay Town, the town has changed gradually to become the second most vibrant and bustling economic hub in the entire Luo Nyanza after Kisumu City and third after Kisii Town in the entire Nyanza province.

Today, the Migori county headquarters is largely cosmopolitan with the influx of population from across the country due to the emerging employment and business opportunities. With the neighbouring Kisii county's lack of adequate land for expansion, Migori town is already experiencing spillover development and growth as a result of its expansive and vast swathe of land that is still available for commercial, residential and farming purposes at relatively low prices.

The near-border town is already boasting of remarkable developments in terms of infrastructure, social amenities, as well as physical development. The town's infrastructure has greatly improved, with some roads being paved and others tarmacked, opening up the interior areas for growth and expansion. The construction of Kiringi bridge and the proposed Nyikendo-Nyamanga bridge is set to open up the town for more commercial space.

The nearly Concluded tarmacking of Migori-Transmara road is expected to shorten the turnaround time of doing business with the capital city of Nairobi as its expected to reduce the current road distance by about 3 hours. The Mara road is also set to open up our town and our lake Victoria beaches to the Masai Mara game park hence spurring growth of tourism and hospitality industries.

In the last five years alone, we have seen rapid transformation, with the construction of numerous commercial buildings, mid level hotels and restaurants, emerging shopping malls, unprecedented number of supermarkets and residential flats.

Underway are plans by the county government for a modern bus terminus at Namba junction and a modern market to rid the town of roadside hawkers and stalls. The ever increasing number of financial institutions that now stands at over 10 besides numerous Sacco and micro finances crowns it all. More residential and commercial buildings are still coming up as every strategic investor seeks to lay their stake in this emerging economy.

== Urban Planning ==
The town faces a serious problem of urban planning because it started out not as a town but as shopping center besides the Kenya-Tanzania A-1 international road. As such, town has buildings on each side of the main highway which is paved. The subsequent streets after the main highway are not paved and are poorly managed. There has not been effective response from the government to re-plan the town to accommodate aesthetics and necessities. In 2013, the County Government of Migori paved a second bridge over River Migori to ease congestion at the urban center. Most of the residents in this city live in unmarked or non-addressed buildings and the streets have no names. The city is also crossed by a permanent river dividing the town right in the middle but the riverside has no proper development such as a waterfront or a side-walk. The river itself is excessively polluted by residents and companies.

== Cost of Living ==
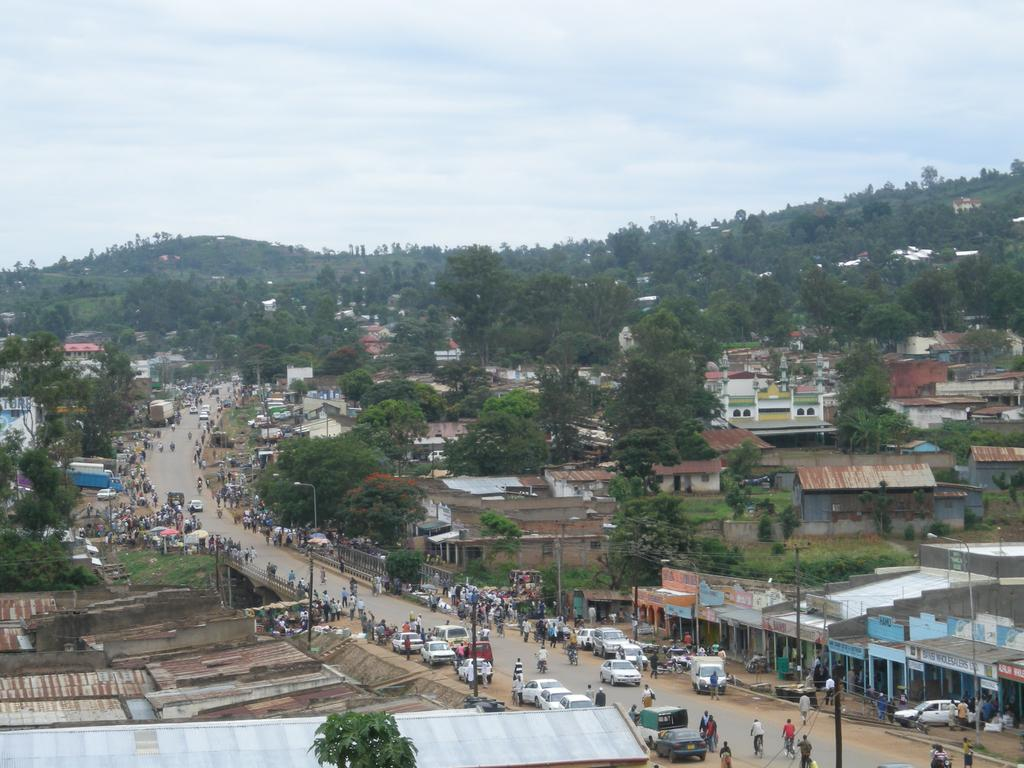

Jesse Sikali's article in The Standard reported that Migori was experiencing a high demand for highrise buildings as a result of increased demand for office and residential spaces. The demand for new houses has started a process of gentrification of the city as older buildings are being taken down and replaced by newer modern looking buildings. Besides buying out poorer owners, the new builders mostly foreign or corrupt county officials put buildings that are over-priced for the town. In the past four to five years, a piece of 50 by 100 ft land went for $2500, today (2015), the same piece of land goes for $3500. The price for an acre is $12000. The rents have also increased as a one-bedroom house that used to be for $35 per month is now $50, while two bedroom house used to be $50 but is now $80. Three bedroom houses are now $100 from $80 three years back. Some of the houses are fully furnished to accommodate transient lifestyles.

== Geography ==
The elevation is roughly 1500 meters above sea level (asl.) at Kakrao descending by 100 m asl. into the Migori river. The different peaks near the town are a little over 1550 m asl.

Rainfall is in two seasons like in most of Kenya and the highest rainfall is between March and May. Average rainfall is approximately 1200 mm and above, but the rainfall patterns are unique, as the small town has three patterns of rainfall according to the neighborhood. It could rain in Kakrao but around Onyalo school would be very dry and Namba would have a slight drizzle.

The soils are well-drained and tend to be loamy. This favors the cultivation of tobacco, sugarcane, maize, beans, coffee, groundnuts and vegetables. However, agricultural production is restricted by the drought periods if no irrigation water is available.

The town is home to the Suna people with a significant immigrant luo community in between. Recent migration has introduced a significant number of Maragolis. It is not surprising thus, that many villagers around the town speak Maragoli and Luo e.g. Ojijo pastor. There are also significant numbers of Kisiis, Kikuyus (Though the unfortunate skirmishes of 2007 left many of the Kikuyus traumatised). The language of business is Kiswahili, which shows the big difference with other Luo-dominated towns.

The Church and Mosque life is very vibrant and at times very loud but this is expected to change with the new Noise laws introduced by Nema. As of December 2015, nothing has been done to curb the noise. The call to prayer in the Islamic quarter begin at 4:00 am and can be heard throughout the town.

== Trade and mining ==
There has been gold mining activities in the area. Mining was centered in Macalader area of Migori on the way to Sori (Karungu Bay). There is a significant gold mining activity in Rongo constituency of migori county.

Most activity is centered on the main highway that crosses the town. Most activity is Small and Micro enterprises largely the Jua Kali with a concentration in auto mechanics, furniture works, tailoring, welding, trade and agriculture. Agricultural produce comes from surrounding areas like Ngege, oyani, anjego etc. Other profit making organisations include Barclays, KCB, K-rep, family finance, Co-op and Post banks.

in the 1980s to early 1990s, the town was well known as a hotbed of benga music. Several luo benga musicians like Ouma Omore and Prince Jully recorded and performed benga music in the town.

There is a National cereals board depot.

== Plants and wildlife ==
Some common trees include Bondo (Euphorbiacandelabrum), Ochwoga (Carissa edulis), Mukinduri (Croton megalocarpus), Ngow (Ficus nataliensis), Onera (Terminalia brownii), Toona does well in the area but most trees are multi-branched, which may indicate bud borer trouble. Terminalia catappa, Cypress (a Cupressus lusitanica variant) does well in the area and some pine has been grown successfully.

The birdlife in Migori is varied with many records of blue flycatcher, blue-spotted wood dove, harrier hawk, bat hawk, baglafecht weaver, tawny eagle, purple grenadier, beautiful sunbird, yellow-billed stork, hadada ibis, African citril, cape turtle dove, paradise flycatcher, yellow white eye, white-browed robin chat, black-headed gonolek, black kite among others.

== Transportation ==
Migori is connected by road to the Masai Mara national park, but the road is in poor condition. Migori town is immediately after Awendo, (where the Sony Sugar Company is situated), Oyani, Stella and Kakrao areas. The road to Isebania is well tarmacked from Kakrao to Mwanza in Tanzania. The road connecting Migori town to Masara is also currently tarmacked.

Air passengers in Migori are served by Migori Airport.

== Culture ==
Migori annually holds the Migori Agricultural Society at the Migori Municipal Stadium. Farmers and cooperatives assemble at the fair to showcase their products. Usually, the function is also graced by traditional dances, fashion shows, horse racing, disco dances, and inter school sports. Jacquie Jones wrote and published a poem titled "Migori" in Obsidian II Vol 2: No: 3 (Winter 1987).

== Educational Institutions ==
Secondary or High Schools

- Kibabii University
- Pesoda Annex High School
- Baby Shines Academy
- Nyabisawa Girls school
- Onyalo Mixed Secondary School
- St. Pius Uriri High school.
- Bware Friends School.
- Oruba Mixed Secondary
- Pentagon Academy
- Magongo Secondary School
- Kanga High School
- Kanyawanga High School
- Kadika girls High School
- Migori Boys High School
- Isibania High School
- Moi Nyabohanse Girls High School
- Tarang'anya Boys High School
- Nyikendo Mix Secondary School
- Nyaduong' Secondary School
- Mukuyu Mixed Secondary School
- Kakrao Mixed Secondary School
- Ugari Mixed Secondary School
- Kokuro Secondary School
- Piny Owacho Secondary School
- Ikerege high school
- Nyankore School
- Rapogi Boys High School
- St. Paul Ageng'a High School
- Sori High School
- Bande Girls Secondary School
- Okenge Mixed Secondary school
- Kibuon Secondary School
- Ndiwa Girls secondary school

Higher Learning Institutions

- Migori Teachers College
- Msomi Teachers Training College
- Rongo University
- Kenya Medical Training College Migori Campus
