= Sumba Island (Kenya) =

Kenyan island in Lake Victoria

Sumba Island is an island in Lake Victoria that is divided between Kenya and Uganda. It is located in the administrative area of Busia County in the western part of the country, 400 km west of the capital Nairobi.

The average annual temperature in the neighborhood is 20 °C. The warmest month is March, when the average temperature is 24 °C, and the coldest is May, with 18 °C. The average annual rainfall is 1,537 millimeters. The driest month is April, with 221 mm of precipitation on average, and the driest is February, with 38 mm of precipitation.

Sumba Island is one of the reference points used to differentiate the border between Kenya and Uganda. In July 2019 it was reported that Ugandan police officers stormed Sumba Island and confiscated boat engines and fishing nets from local fishermen accusing them of fishing in Ugandan waters. The fishermen claimed they were whipped, forced to eat raw fish, and pay hefty fines to retrieve their possessions.
