= Suna West Constituency =

Kenyan constituency formed in 2013

Suna West
- constituency for the Parliament of Kenya
- Suna West Constituency within Migori County

- Migori County within Kenya
- County: Migori
- Population: 128,890
- Area: 288 km^{2} (111.2 sq mi)

Current constituency
- Number of members: 1
- Party: ODM
- Member of Parliament: Peter Masara
- Wards: 4

Suna West is a constituency in Kenya. It is one of eight constituencies in Migori County. It was established in 2013 when Migori Constituency was divided into Suna East and Suna West.

== Members of Parliament ==
Elections	MP	Party	Notes
2013	Hon. Joseph Obiero Ndiege	ODM	
2017	Peter Francis Masara	IND	
