= Uriri Constituency =

Electoral constituency in Kenya

Uriri
- constituency for the Parliament of Kenya
- Uriri Constituency within Migori County

- Migori County within Kenya
- County: Migori
- Population: 141,448
- Area: 392 km^{2} (151.4 sq mi)

Current constituency
- Number of members: 1
- Party: ODM
- Member of Parliament: Mark Ogolla Nyamita
- Wards: 5

Uriri is an electoral constituency in Kenya. It is one of eight constituencies of Migori County. There are five wards in the constituency, all electing councillors to the Migori County council. Its mainly inhabited by two ethnic tribes namely Luo and the Abaluhya, who live harmoniously, with kiswahili being the major language in this sub county region.

== Agriculture ==
The common agricultural produce from this region include sugarcane and tobacco (the two are the leading cash crops of this region) maize, beans, groundnuts, and arrow root. The area serves as a major sugarcane catchment area for Sony Sugar Company Limited, Sukari Industries and Transmara Sugar Company. With the development of Sh120 million Mara Tea Factory, a few farmers are already branching out into tea farming as well.

== Education ==
The region faces challenges in education system. It has few secondary schools which have adequate facilities, and few primary schools. Among the few secondary schools it has are Arambe Secondary School, St. Pius Uriri High School, Mukuyu Secondary School, Achuth Secondary School, and Bware Secondary School. Among the leading primary schools are Luoro Primary School, St. Mary's Oyola Primary School, Kamsaki Primary School, Kolwal Primary School, Bware Primary School, Mukuyu Primary School, Uriri Primary School, Magongo Primary School, Sigira Primary School, and Korondo Primary School.

Girls' education in Uriri sub-county faces challenges, with many families opting for early marriages due to inadequate schools and poverty in the region.

== Sports and culture ==
Uriri has rich culture due to the presence of various communities and denominations. Every five years its graced with the Abatiriki circumcision ceremonies, and every two years the Maragoli circumcision ceremonies. Religious doctrines such as Islam and Christianity are also well practiced.

Football is the sport of the day as many youths participate in local tourneys and village tournaments organized by the local leaders. These include Madegwa Cup Tourney and Mudeisi tournament. Common teams include Kolwal FC, Kamsaki FC, Bware HomeBoyz FC, Korondo FC, Mukuyu FC, and Uriri United.

== Politics ==
=== Members of Parliament ===
Elections	MP	Party	Notes
1997	Herman O. Omamba	NDP	
2002	Herman O. Omamba	NARC	
2007	Hon.Cyprian Ojwang Omollo	ODM	
2013	Hon.John Kobado	ODM	
2017	Hon.Mark Ogolla Nyamita	ODM	

=== Wards ===
Ward	Registered voters
Central Kanyamkago	5,424
East Kanyamkago	3,537
North Kanyamkago	10,011
South Kanyamkago	9,085
West Kanyamkago	6,985
Total	35,094
*September 2005
