= Migingo Island =

Kenyan island on Lake Victoria

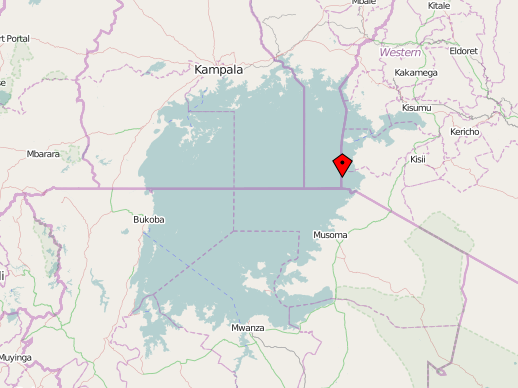

Geography
- Location: Lake Victoria
- Coordinates: 0°52′58″S 33°56′17″E
- Total islands: 1
- Area: 2,000 m^{2} (22,000 sq ft)
- Highest elevation: 15 m (49 ft)

Administration
- Kenya
- County: Migori County

Demographics
- Population: 131 (2009)
- Pop. density: 65,500/km^{2} (169600/sq mi)

Migingo is an island on Lake Victoria in Kenya. At only 2,000 m^{2} (0.49-acre; 0.20 ha), it is the 7th most densely populated island on earth . The island has been a low-level territorial dispute between Kenya and Uganda. Migingo's location makes it useful for Kenyan and Ugandan fishermen.

== History ==
Two Kenyan fishermen, Dalmas Tembo and George Kibebe, claim to have been the first inhabitants on the island. When they settled there in 1991, it was covered with weeds, and many birds and snakes lived there. Joseph Nsubuga, a Ugandan fisherman, claimed he settled on Migingo in 2004, when all he found on the island was an abandoned house. Subsequently, other fishermen—from Kenya, Uganda and Tanzania—came to the island because of its proximity to fishing grounds rich with Nile perch. Kenyan fishermen claimed in 2009 that since the Nile perch do not breed in Uganda (the nearest Ugandan land is 85 km (53 mi) away), the fish "belonged to Kenyans".

=== Uganda–Kenya dispute ===
The Kenyan government claimed in June 2004 that Ugandan marine police pitched a tent on the island and raised the Ugandan flag and that of their police department. Ugandan and Kenyan police have since occupied the island at various times.

A diplomatic row between the two countries arose in February 2009, when Kenyans living on Migingo were required to purchase special permits from the Ugandan government.

A Ugandan-government press release in March 2009 proposed that the matter be resolved by a land survey, using as a guideline the boundaries set by the Kenya Colony and Protectorate Order in Council, 1926, which is copied into the Ugandan constitution, and which identifies the boundary line as tangentially touching the western tip of Pyramid Island, and then running in a straight line just west of due north to the western tip of Kenya's' Ilemba Island.

Several government ministers, including Kenyan foreign minister Moses Wetangula and Ugandan foreign minister Sam Kutesa met in Kampala, Uganda on 13 March 2009, and reached an agreement that the fishermen from both countries be allowed to continue conducting business as usual, until the boundary was determined by experts. They also agreed that Uganda would withdraw the 48 policemen it had deployed on Migingo.

Ugandan and Kenyan ministers travelled to the island two weeks later to hold negotiations and address the residents. This ended in a row, with Ugandan First Deputy Prime Minister Eriya Kategaya taking issue with Kenyan Minister for Lands James Orengo for calling the Ugandan delegation "hyenas" during the meeting. The Kenyan delegation demanded that Uganda withdraw its police. The Ugandan delegation insisted that they would remove the flag only after consulting their president and that the Ugandan policemen were there to keep law and order. Kenya's Internal Security Assistant Minister Orwa Ojode replied that he would be sending Kenyan police to the island.

Amidst concerns that the dispute could affect cooperation between the two countries and within the East African Community, both Ugandan President Yoweri Museveni and Kenyan President Mwai Kibaki had voiced confidence that the dispute, including fishing rights, will be resolved amicably.

=== Territorial claims ===
Territorial ownership of the island has been consistently shown on maps and in language on official documents as Kenyan since 1926. Uganda began to claim the island in 2008. Much if not most of the Ugandan protests revolve around fishing rights, mostly for valuable Nile perch, and Ugandan waters come within 510 m (1,670 ft) of the island. President Museveni conceded in May 2009 that the island is in Kenya, but continued to point out that Kenyan fishermen were illegally fishing in Ugandan waters, which lie to the west of Migingo.

A joint re-demarcation line of the border was launched on 2 June 2009 to recover and to place survey markers on land, making delineation of the boundary on the lake more precise, with results released in late July 2009 confirming that the island falls 510 m (1,670 ft) on the Kenyan side of the line. This finding is supported by openly available Google Earth imagery. The Ugandan government shifted its official position, stating that while Migingo Island was Kenyan, much of the waters near it were Ugandan. The Ugandan flag was lowered, Uganda withdrew its military troops, and agreed that all its police officers would leave the island.

== Geography ==
A rocky and rugged piece of land with little vegetation, Migingo is one of three small islands in close proximity. The much larger Usingo Island is 200 m (660 ft) to the east of Migingo. Pyramid Island, the largest of the three, is 2 km (1.2 mi) due south of Migingo and 11 km (6.8 mi) north of the Tanzanian border in Lake Victoria. On detailed maps, all three islands have been shown on the Kenyan side since the 1920s, when the Kenya Colony and Protectorate Order in Council (1926) awarded all three islands to Kenya. The boundary delineation in that agreement and the Constitution of Uganda state that the boundary line runs to "the westernmost point of Pyramid Island ... thence continuing by a straight line northerly to the most westerly point of Ilemba Island." A line connecting those two points runs 510 m (1,670 ft) west of Migingo, placing the island within Kenya along with the larger Pyramid and Usingo Islands, as shown on most maps since 1926.

Migingo's location within 200 m (660 ft) of the much larger Usingo Island is clear both on Google Earth and on widely available television network videos depicting aerial helicopter photography. Migingo Island is so small that it is not displayed on some maps. Despite a Uganda government official's claims that it "emerged from the water", in the first decade of the 21st century, water levels dropped 0.5–1 m (1 ft 8 in – 3 ft 3 in) in the lake from the normal level. Recent photographs show the island reaching 10–15 m (33–49 ft) above the lake level.

=== Demographics ===
In 2009, the island had a reported population of 131, mostly fishermen and fish traders, whose homes are constructed of corrugated metal. They are served by four pubs, a number of brothels, a pharmacy, and an open-air casino. The island has a population density of more than 65,400/km^{2} (169,500/sq mi) which makes it one of the most densely populated islands in Africa and the world. However, Ugandan police have estimated an even higher population at about 500 people, and therefore 250,000/km^{2} (650,000/sq mi).

== See also ==
- Kenya–Uganda relations
- Politics of Kenya
- Politics of Uganda
- Lake Victoria
