= Kiringiti Island =

Island in Lake Victoria

Coordinates: 0°27′24″S 33°55′56″E

Kiringiti Island is the name given to an island in Lake Victoria. Administratively, it belongs to Kenya. It is part of the Homa Bay County, in the western part of the country, 300 km west of the capital Nairobi.

The average annual temperature on the island is 21°C. The warmest month is March, when the average temperature is 24°C, and the coldest is June, with 19°C. The average annual rainfall is 1,383 millimeters. The driest month is April, with 224 mm of precipitation on average, and the driest is July, with 34 mm of precipitation.

Kiringiti Island is one of the reference points used to differentiate the border between Kenya and Uganda.
