= Migori County =

Coordinates: 0°40′S 34°50′E

Migori
- County
- Migori County
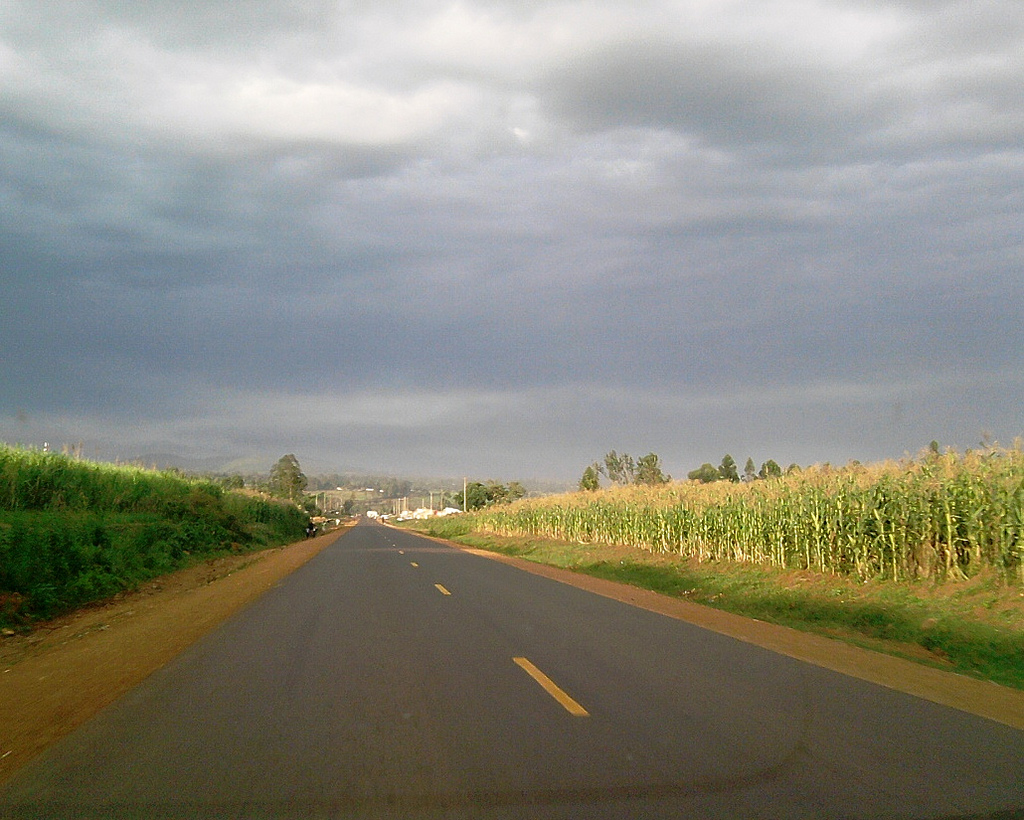
- Close to Awendo Town, Migori

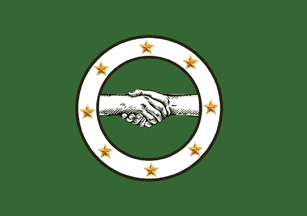
- Flag

- Location in Kenya
- Country: Kenya
- Formed: 4 March 2013
- Capital: Migori

Government
  - Governor: Ochilo Ayacko

Area
  - Total: 2,586.4 km^{2} (998.6 sq mi)

Population (2019)
  - Total: 1,116,436
  - Density: 431.66/km^{2} (1,118.0/sq mi)
- Time zone: UTC+3 (EAT)
- Website: migori.go.ke

Migori County is a county in the former Nyanza Province of southwestern Kenya. It borders Homa Bay County to the north, Kisii County to the northeast, Narok County to the southeast, Tanzania to the west and south, and Lake Victoria to the west. The county also borders Uganda via Migingo Island in Lake Victoria. The county's headquarter is Migori, which is also its largest town. In the 2019 National Census, Migori County had a population of 1,116,436, almost 200,000 more than the 917,170 recorded in 2009.

Migori County is located in the sugar belt wetlands of western Kenya and is at the heart of the African tropics. However, the county enjoys a pleasant climate due to its high altitude which modifies the climate alongside the cool breeze from Lake Victoria.

Demographically, Migori County is the most diverse region of the former Nyanza Province after Kisumu County. Its inhabitants include the Suba, Joluo, Kuria, Abagusii, Luhya, Somalis, Indians, Arabs, Agikuyu and Nubians.

The county is important to Kenya because of the significance of Isebania border post to the East African economy, the A-1 Kenya -Tanzania road cuts the county in half, Sony (South Nyanza) Sugar Company, Lake Victoria and food sustainability of Western region of Kenya and the meat industry courtesy of the ranches in Kuria Sub county and Suna West.

Migori town serves as in important link between Kenya and Tanzania and the second most viable commercial center in Luo-Nyanza after Kisumu. Other major towns in Migori county include Kehancha, Rongo, Awendo and Isebania in Kuria District.

== Religion ==
Religion in Migori County

Religion (2019 Census)	Number
Catholicismy	190,734
Protestant	411,800
Evangelical Churches	280,400
African instituted Churches	152,709
Orthodox	8,012
Other Cristian	32,242
Islam	7,552
Hindu	134
Traditionists	2,652
Other	14,495
No ReligionAtheists	7,370
Don't Know	712
Not Stated	137

== Location ==
Migori Town (-1.0634,34.4731) is 368 kilometers from Nairobi. Migori town is bordered by hills.

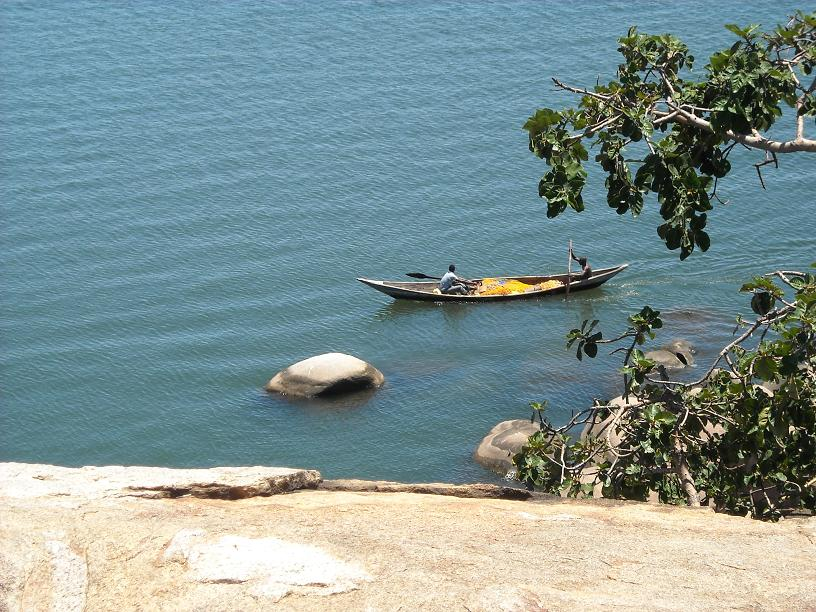

Water bodies in the county include the Kuja and Migori rivers, and Lake Victoria.

== Economy ==
The main economic activities include agriculture, fishing, manufacturing and mining. There is some small scale gold mining carried out in the county such as in parts of Kehancha and Masaba areas.

The county also sees some limited commercial activity, mainly small and micro-enterprises in the Jua Kali sector. These include auto mechanics, furniture works, tailoring, welding, trade and agriculture.

Agricultural activity is carried out in areas such as Ngege, Oyani and Anjego. There is a National Cereals and Produce Board depot in Kehancha and Migori Town.

The county is part of the Lake Region Economic Bloc (LREB) established in 2018 to foster regional economic, industrial, social, and technological collaboration.

Demographics

According to the Kenya National Bureau of Statistics National Census data Migori has a population of 1,116,436 with 536,187 males and 580,214 females, and 35 intersex. Below is the breakdown of the population based on the constituencies of the county.

1. Kuria West 101,090 (Male) 107,417 (Female) 6 (Intersex) Total= 208,513
2. Nyatike 83,989 (Male) 92,164 (Female) 9 (Intersex) Total= 176,162
3. Uriri 68,127 (Male) 73,318 (Female) 3 (Intersex) Total= 141,448
4. Suna West 61,430 (Male) 67,459 (Female) 1 (Intersex) Total= 128,890
5. Rongo 59,257 (Male) 65,329 (Female) 1 (Intersex) Total= 124,587
6. Suna East 58,977 (Male) 63,694 (Female) 3 (Intersex) Total= 122,674
7. Awendo 56,348 (Male) 60,939 (Female) (Intersex) Total= 117,290
8. Kuria East 46,969 (Male) 49,894 (Female) 9 (Intersex) Total= 96,872

The population density is 353 PER SQ. km and 43% of the population live below the poverty line. The age distribution was 0–14 years 49%, 15–64 years 48% and over 65 years 3%. Kuria West Constituency has the highest density at 490/km2 while Nyatike Constituency had the lowest at 213/km2. While the population of the county as of 2009 was 917,170, it is expected to grow to about 1.3 million people by 2018. Children below the age of 15 account for 49% of the population of the county.

Urban Centers and Towns

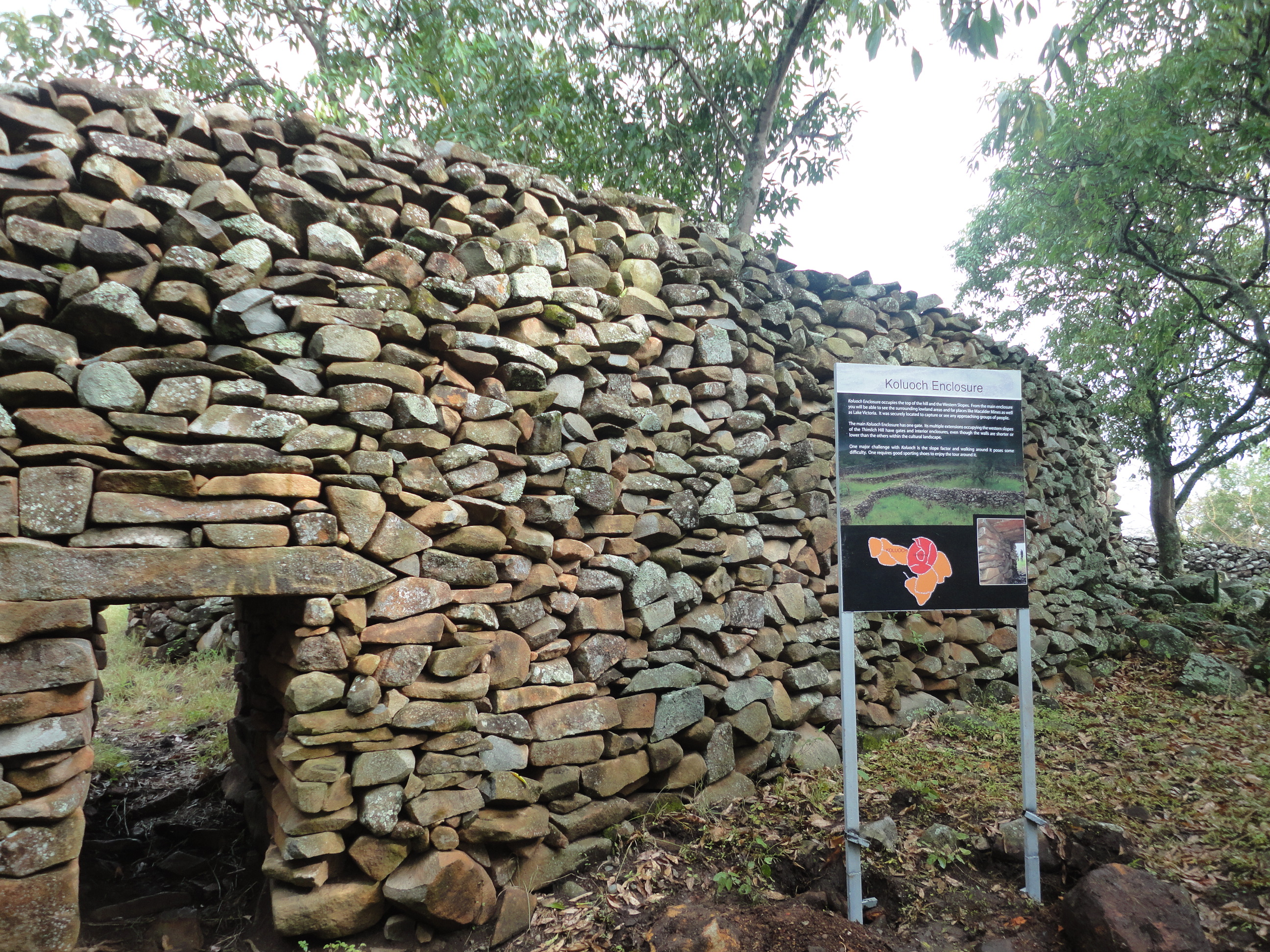

Migori County has several urban centers and municipalities which are clustered into two groups. The first are towns councils and municipalities and include Migori town in Suna East/and Suna West which has about 100,000 people. Migori town acts as the capital of the county and hosts several important economic and political institutions. The second municipality is Kehancha town in Kuria West which has a population of approximately 50,000 people.

The second cluster of urban centers in Migori are town councils and these include Rongo Town, Awendo Town and Isebania border.

Other important trading centers or rural shopping centers in the county include Muhuru Bay, Macalder Mines, Karungu Bay, Bondo Nyironge, Ogwedhi Sigawa, God Jope, Giribe among others.

Climate

Migori county has two main rainy seasons. The first rainy seasons starts in March and ends in May and is called long rains. The second season called "opon" starts in September and ends in November. The driest months are between December and February and June and September. The minimum average temperatures is usually the low of 24 degrees Celsius (74 F) and a high of 31 degrees Celsius (87 F). Rainfalls come in the afternoon and the heat is often dry and thus bearable.

Tourism and Places to Visit

The county has no official national park or game reserve. However, the county boasts of several interesting places of interest that one can find appealing to visit.

=== Macalder Mines ===
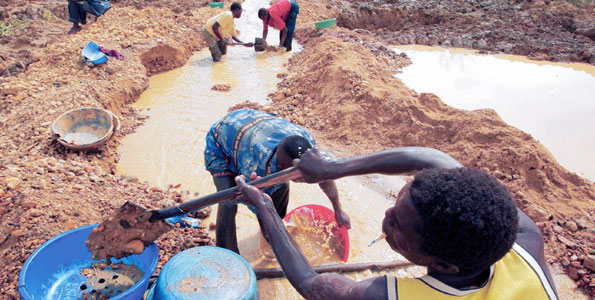

This is a 90km gold belt that has been exploited for over 70 years by artisan miners using traditional method.

=== Gogo Falls ===
The dam which was built on River Kuja in 1957 provides a capacity of about 60 watts and is a primary source of power for the towns in the county and water for the dams.

=== Thimlich Ohinga ===
Thimlich Ohinga is an old African civilization of the Luo people of Kadem clan formerly labeled Liare Valley and described as "the frightening dense forest." This old settlement was a village built on stones by the early Luo/Suba people around the 14th century. Ohinga is a Luo word for fort wall.

=== God Kweru Shrine ===
Locally known as the "Calvary" this place is a religious site for the Legio Maria followers, a traditional African religion formed to fight colonialism in the 1940s. The followers of Legio Maria host their yearly pilgrimages at the Got Kweru shrine in Suna West.

=== Muhuru Bay ===
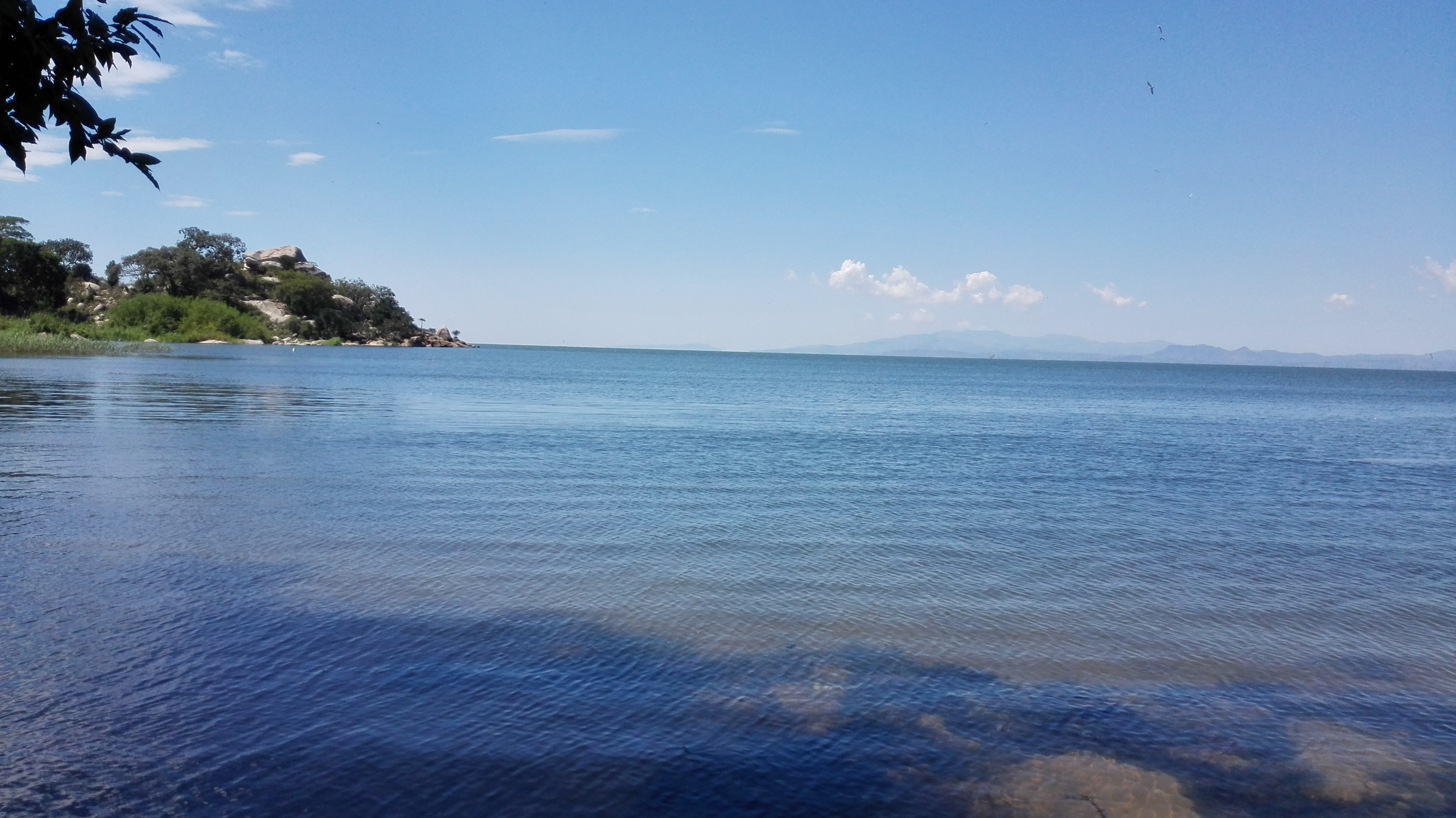

Muhuru Bay is the Miami of Migori County. It provides white sandy shores lined with palms comes and magnificent natural sites and bays. It is also known for fresh Lake Victoria Nile Perches, Tilapia, Kamongo among other fishes.There is a beach hotel named Muhuru Bay Beach Hotel where events such as boat excursion, exploring, fishing and bird watching happens. Muhuru Bay is increasingly popular with back packers from the United States.

== Flora and fauna ==
Some common trees and shrubs include Bondo (Euphorbia candelabrum), Ochwoga (Carissa edulis), Mukinduri (Croton megalocarpus), Ngow (fig), Bong'u (Ficus spp.), Onera (Terminalia brownii), Toona ciliata, Ochond rateng'/Musaja (Sapium spp.), Oncoba spinosa, Terminalia catappa, and cypress.

The birds here are varied with many records of blue flycatcher, blue-spotted wood dove, harrier hawk, bat hawk, baglafecht weaver, tawny eagle, purple grenadier, sunbird, yellow-billed stork, hadada ibis, African citril, cape turtle dove, paradise flycatcher, yellow white eye, white-browed robinchat, black-headed gonolek, and black kite among others.

== Education ==
Only 15% of Migori County residents have secondary level of education or above. Rongo constituency has the highest share of residents with a secondary level of education or above at 19%. This is 7 percentage points above Kuria East constituency, which has the lowest share.

Rongo constituency is 4 percentage points above the county average. Suna Central ward has the highest share of residents with a secondary level of education or above at 31%. This is five times Wasimbete ward, which has the lowest share of residents with a secondary level of education or above. Suna Central ward is 16 percentage points above the county average.

A total of 65% of Migori County residents have a primary level of education only. Uriri constituency has the highest share of residents with a primary level of education only at 68%. This is 5 percentage points above Kuria West constituency, which has the lowest share of residents with a primary level of education only. Uriri constituency is 3 percentage points above the county average. West Kanyamkago ward has the highest share of residents with a primary level of education only at 71%. This is 19 percentage points above Isibania ward, which has the lowest share of residents with primary only. West Kanyamkago ward is 6 percentage points above the county average.

Some 20% of Migori County residents have no formal education. Kuria East constituency has the highest share of residents with no formal education at 24%. This is 6 percentage points above Rongo constituency, which has the lowest share of residents with no formal education. Kuria East constituency is 4 percentage points above the county average. Ntimaru East ward has the highest percentage of residents with no formal education at 31%. This is twice Central Kamagambo ward, which has the lowest percentage of residents with no formal education. Ntimaru ward is 11 percentage points above the county average.

== Employment ==
In Migori County, 9% of the residents with no formal education, 9% of those with a primary education and 22% of those with a secondary level of education or above are working for pay.

== Roads ==
The main highway in Migori is the A-1 road to Tanzania which passes from Rongo to Isebania and is the only road on bitumen standard at around 105 kilometers. The rest of the roads are 1928 kilometers of which a quarter are gravel while majority are earth roads.

=== Airports ===
The county is served by three airstrips namely Lichota (Migori Town), Macalder Mines and Kehancha.

== Energy ==
A video demonstrating cooking with firewood in Kenya

Only 1% of residents in Migori County use liquefied petroleum gas (LPG), and 2% use paraffin. 80% use firewood and 17% use charcoal. Firewood is the most common cooking fuel by gender with 85% of female headed households and 77% of male headed households using it.

Uriri constituency has the highest level of firewood use in Migori County at 93%.This is 23 percentage points above Suna West constituency, which has the lowest share at 70%. Uriri constituency is about percentage points above the county average. West Kanyamkago ward has the highest level of firewood use in Migori County at 98%.This is five times Isibania ward, which has the lowest share. West Kanyamkago ward is 18 percentage points above the county average.

Suna West constituency has the highest level of charcoal use in Migori County at 26%.This is 20 percentage points above Uriri constituency, which has the lowest share. Suna West constituency is 9 percentage points above the county average. Isibania ward has the highest level of charcoal use in Migori County at 71%.This is 69 percentage points more than Kaler ward, which has the lowest share. Isibania ward is 54 percentage points above the county average. Only 5% of residents in Migori County use electricity as their main source of lighting. A further 26% use lanterns, and 66% use tin lamps. 1% use fuel wood. Electricity use is mostly common in male headed households at 6% as compared with female headed households at 4%.

Awendo constituency has the highest level of electricity use at 11%.That is 11 percentage points above Kuria East constituency, which has the lowest level of electricity use. Awendo constituency is 6 percentage points above the county average. Isibania ward has the highest level of electricity use at 26%.That is 26 percentage points above Ntimaru East ward, which has no level of electricity use. Isibania ward is 21 percentage points above the county average

== Health ==
Migori County has four district hospitals and five sub-district hospitals, namely Awendo, Rongo, Uriri.

The most prevalent diseases in the county are malaria, HIV/AIDS, diarrhoea, and upper respiratory tract infections and bilharzia

== Religion ==
The vast majority of Migori dwellers are Christians, with the Seventh-day Adventist, Anglican and Roman Catholic churches being the most established Christian denominations. Other well-established denominations include the African Inland Church and the Presbyterian Church of East Africa.

In addition, there are a number of Evangelical churches and Independent African Christian churches.

Islam is another major religion in Migori. Followers include both Sunni and Shi'ite Muslims. The largest number of Muslims in Migori are found in Migori town centre and the neighboring regions.

Many of the traditional African religions are no longer widely practised. Some of the denominations considered as indigenous religions combine aspects of Christianity with traditional religious beliefs. Two of these denominations are Legio Maria and Roho Israel, found mostly in rural areas.

The few Migorians who adhere to Hinduism and Sikhism are mostly of Indian origin. They reside mostly in Migori Town.

== Subdivisions ==
Local authorities (councils)
Authority	Type	Population*	Urban pop.*
Migori	Municipality	46,576	31,644
Awendo	Town	93,387	13,760
Rongo	Town	64,528	6,175
Migori County	County	310,406	4,331
Total	-	514,897	55,910
* 1999 census. Source:

Administrative divisions
Division	Population*	Urban population*	Population density	Headquarters
Awendo	90,153	13,509	352	Awendo
Karungu	27,901	3,322	201	Karungu
Muhuru	16,882	0	386	
Nyatike	65,502	0	133	
Rongo	79,817	2,918	376	Rongo
Suba East	91,548	29,825	451	Migori
Suba West	52,876	0	191	
Uriri	90,218	0	237	Uriri
Total	514,897	49,574	257 (average)	-
* 1999 census. Sources: ,

The county has eight constituencies:

- Awendo Constituency
- Kuria East Constituency
- Kuria West Constituency
- Nyatike Constituency
- Rongo Constituency
- Suna East Constituency
- Suna West Constituency
- Uriri Constituency

== Villages and settlements ==
- Aneko
- Rongabi

== Gallery ==
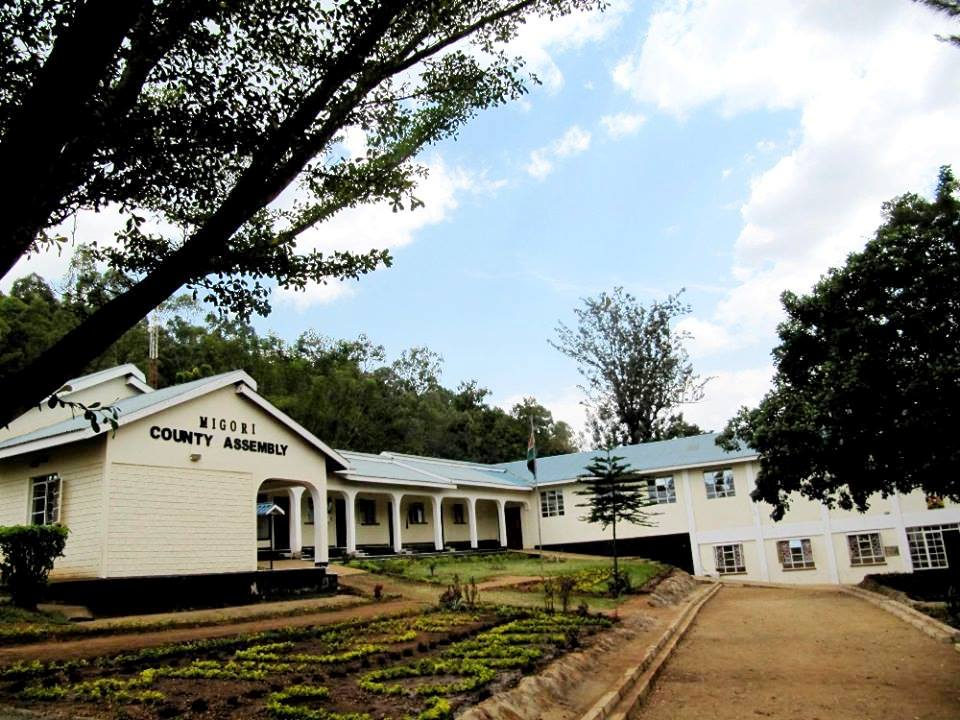

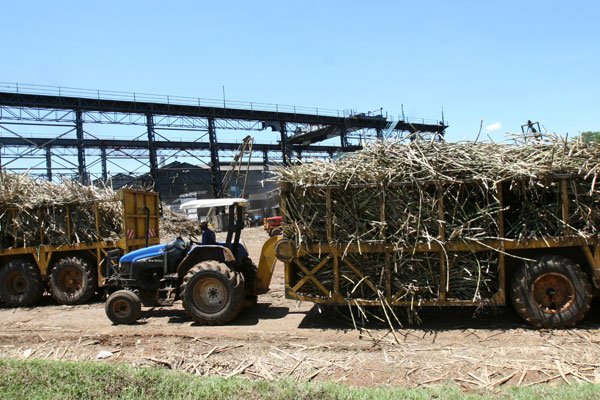

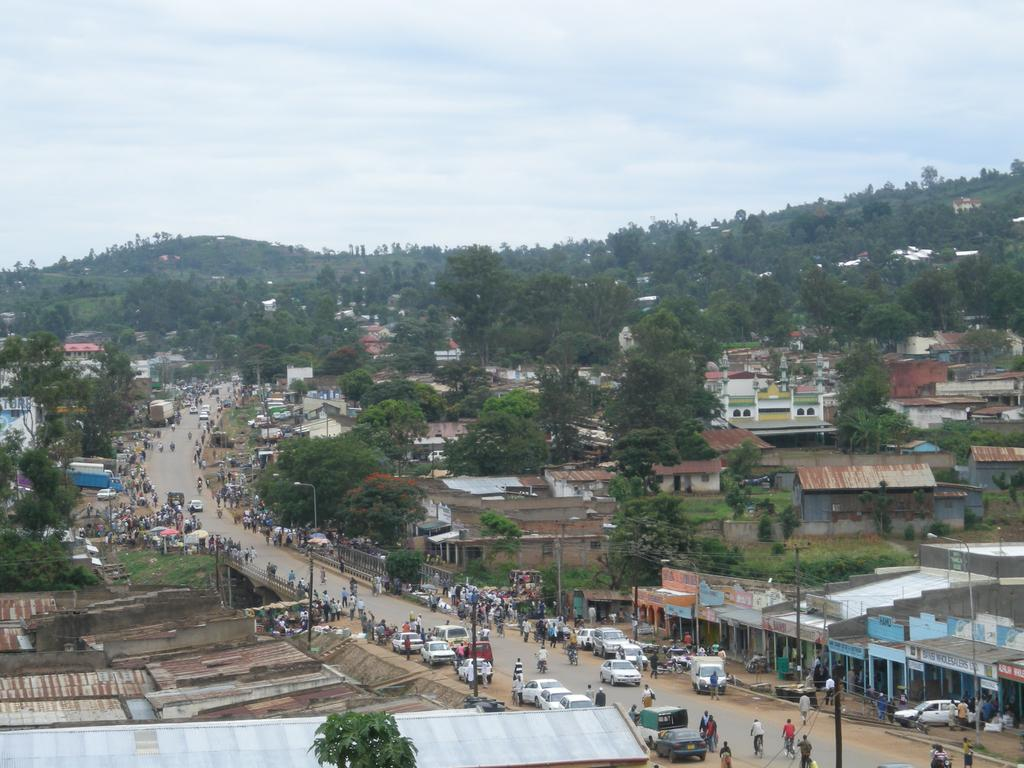

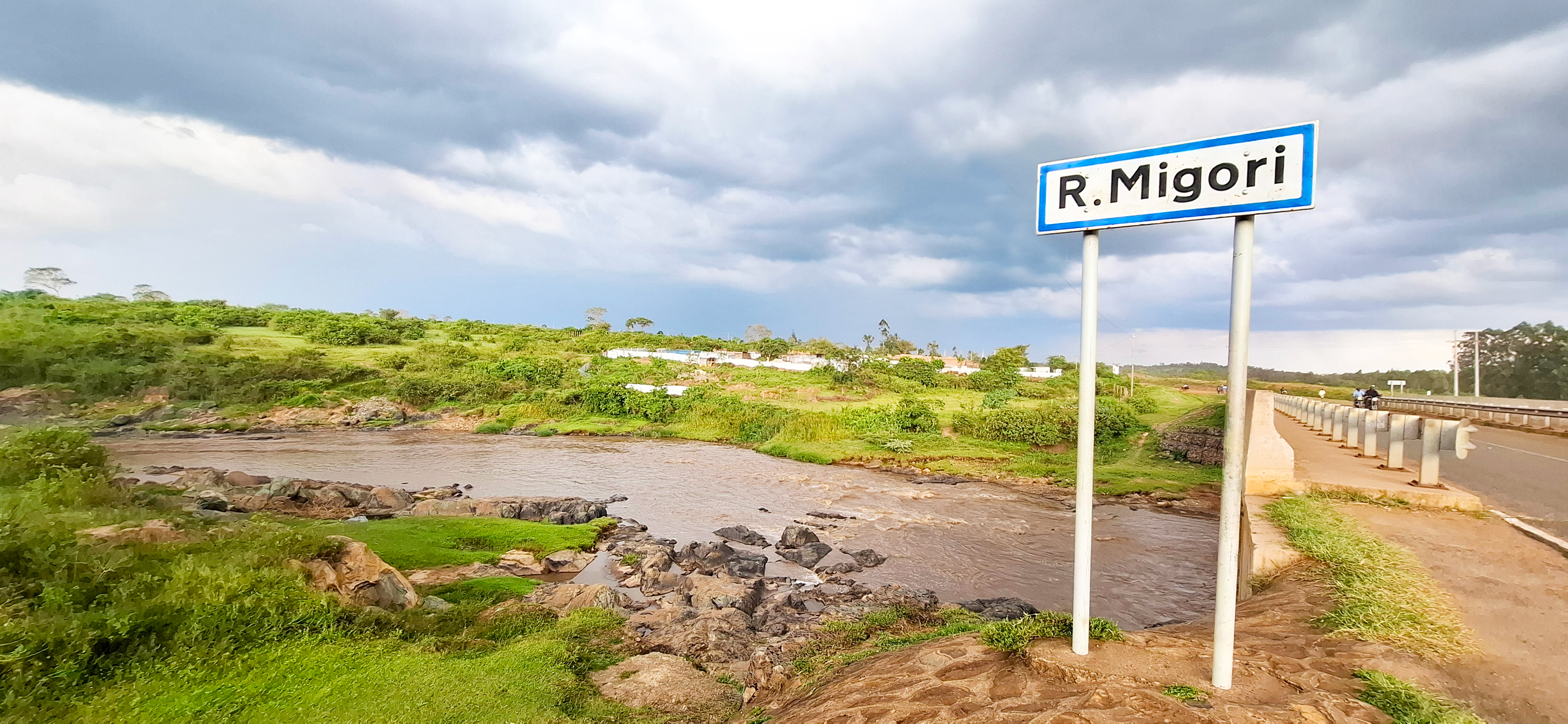
River Migori-Namba, Kehancha

== See also ==
- Counties of Kenya
