= Ilemba Island =

Kenyan island on Lake Victoria

Coordinates: 0°33′39″S 33°55′39″E

Ilemba Island is an island in Lake Victoria. Administratively it belongs to Kenya. It is part of the Homa Bay County, in the western part of the country, 300 km west of the capital Nairobi.

Tropical monsoon climate prevails in the area. The average annual temperature in the island is 21 °C. The warmest month is March, when the average temperature is 24 °C, and the coldest is May, with 18 °C average. The average annual rainfall is 1,383 millimeters. The wettest month is April, with 224 mm of precipitation on average, and the driest is July, with 34 mm of precipitation.

Ilemba Island is one of the reference points used to differentiate the border between Kenya and Uganda.
