= Muhuru Bay =

- Town
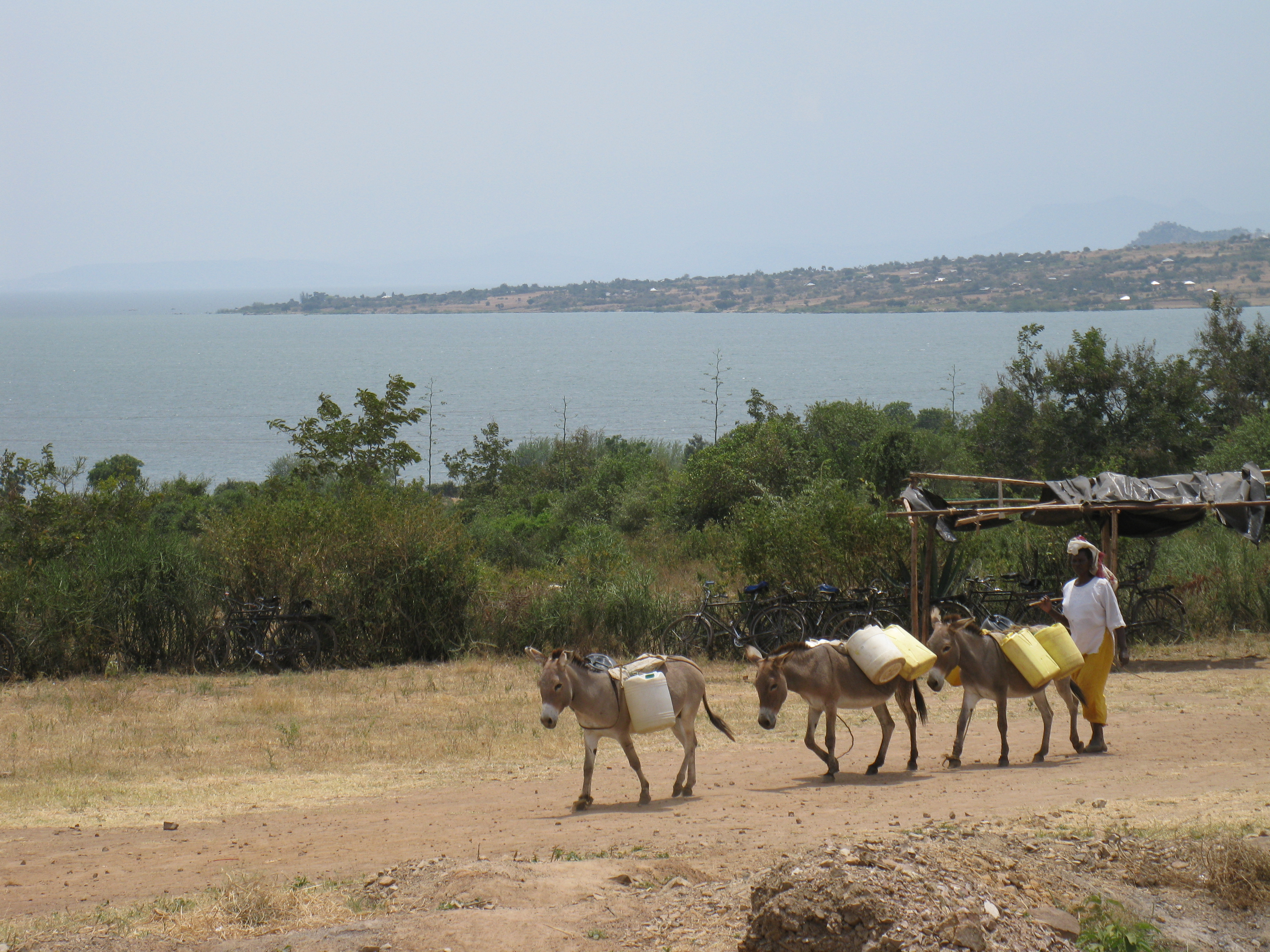
- Muhuru Bay and Lake Victoria
- Nickname: End of the road 'Wuoth Orumo'
- Location within Kenya
- Coordinates: 0°59′53″S 34°5′41″E
- Country: Kenya
- Province: Nyanza Province

Population (2010)
  - Town: 30,000
  - Urban: 30,000
- Time zone: UTC+3 (EAT)

Muhuru Bay is a town in Nyanza Province of Kenya. It is situated on the banks of Lake Victoria, close to the border with Tanzania.
