= Kehancha =

- Municipality
- Country: Kenya
- County: Migori County

Population (2009)
  - Total: 256,086
- Time zone: UTC+3 (EAT)

Kehancha is a town in Kenya's Migori County. It has a total population of 256,086 people.
