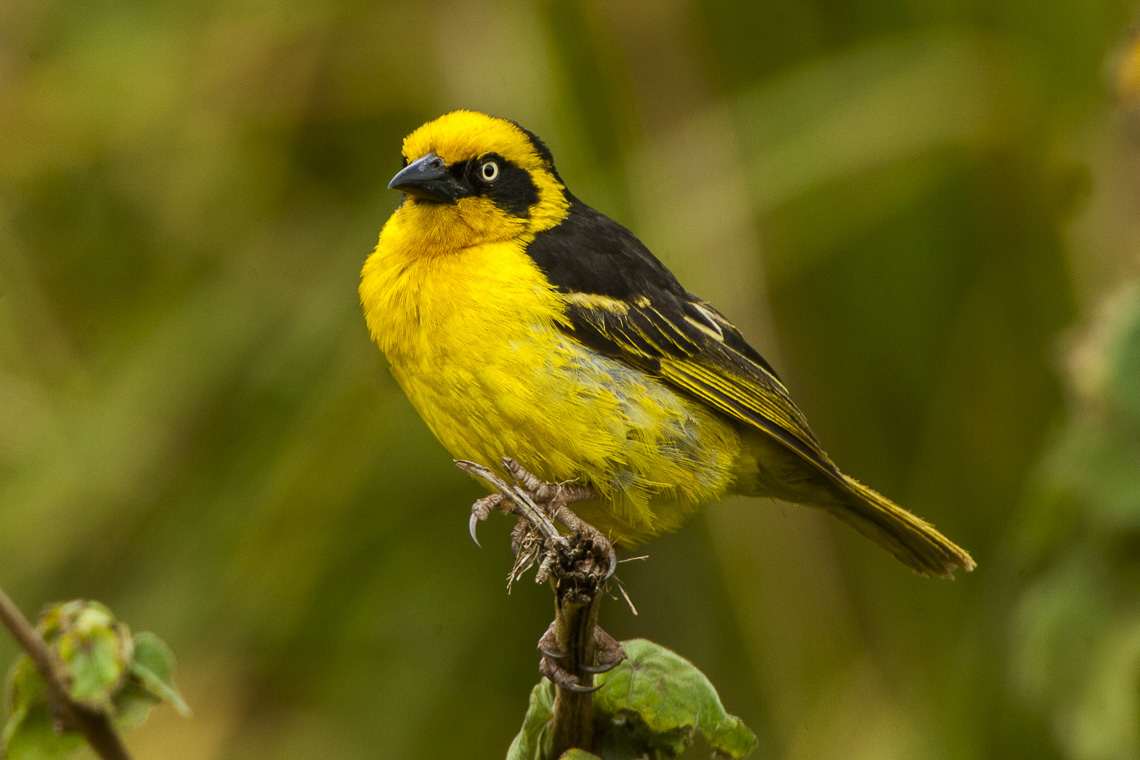
- ♂ P. b. subsp. reichenowi, Tanzania

Conservation status
- Least Concern (IUCN 3.1)

Scientific classification
- Kingdom: Animalia
- Phylum: Chordata
- Class: Aves
- Order: Passeriformes
- Family: Ploceidae
- Genus: Ploceus
- Species: P. baglafecht

Binomial name
- Ploceus baglafecht (Daudin, 1802)

= Baglafecht weaver =

Species of bird

The baglafecht weaver (Ploceus baglafecht) is a species of weaver bird from the family Ploceidae which is found in eastern and central Africa. There are several disjunct populations with distinguishable plumage patterns. Only some races display a discrete non-breeding plumage.

== Taxonomy and systematics ==
The origin of the word baglafecht is something of a mystery and was coined by Georges-Louis Leclerc, Comte de Buffon, probably from a local name in an Abyssinian language.

=== Subspecies ===
The following races are currently recognised:

- P. b. baglafecht - (Daudin, 1802): Found in the Ethiopian highlands and southern Eritrea
- P. b. neumanni - (Bannerman, 1923): Found in eastern Nigeria, Cameroon and Central African Republic
- P. b. eremobius - (Hartlaub & Emin, 1887): Found in north-eastern Democratic Republic of the Congo and south-western South Sudan
- Emin's weaver (P. b. emini) - (Hartlaub, 1882): Found in south-eastern South Sudan, south-western Ethiopia and northern Uganda
- Reichenow's weaver (P. b. reichenowi) - (Fischer, GA, 1884): Found in eastern Uganda, Kenyan highlands and northern Tanzania
- Stuhlmann's weaver (P. b. stuhlmanni) - (Reichenow, 1893): Found from eastern Democratic Republic of the Congo to southern Uganda and western Tanzania
- P. b. sharpii - (Shelley, 1898): Found in montane forests of southern and south-western Tanzania
- P. b. nyikae - (Benson, 1938): Found in Nyika Plateau of north-eastern Zambia and northern Malawi

== Description ==
The baglafecht weaver has a Total Body Length of 15 cm (5.9 in).

The adult male baglafecht weaver has a distinctive black mask which extends from the bill through the eye and onto the ear coverts contrasting with the bright yellow forehead, forecrown and throat. The upperparts are yellowish green with dark centres to the feathers creating a faint streaking. The underparts are bright yellow on the breast fading to white towards the vent. The tail is yellow washed dark brown. The bill is black and the eye is pale yellow.

The female baglafecht weaver lacks a mask but has dusky lores with yellowish-green cap, concolorous with the upperparts. In the non breeding plumage the mask is largely lost but there remains a dusky area around the eye, greyish brown on the upperparts, including the crown, with white washed buff underparts. Juveniles and immature birds do not have a mask on the dark-yellowish green head.

The nominate race and Emin's weaver assume a distinct non-breeding plumage, but Reichenow's weaver does not.

== Distribution and habitat ==
It is found in central, eastern, and south-eastern Africa. It is found in forest edge, woodlands, gardens and towns.

== Behaviour and ecology ==
The baglafecht weaver normally breeds singly rather than in colonies. The nests are loosely woven and usually placed in the foliage of trees or bushes. It is often aggressive to other birds and not shy of people.

== Gallery ==
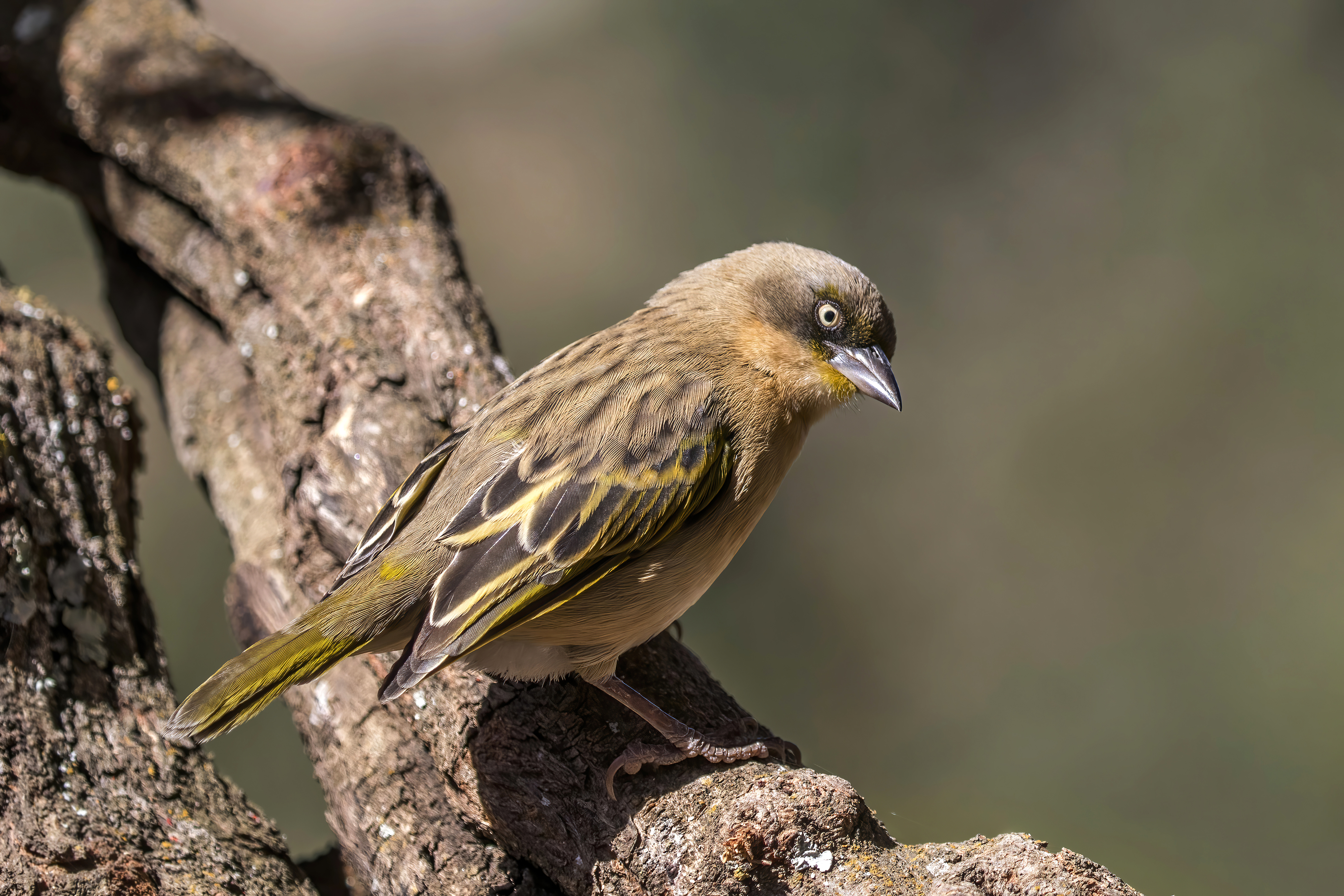
P. b. baglfecht, Ethiopia
male in non-breeding plumage

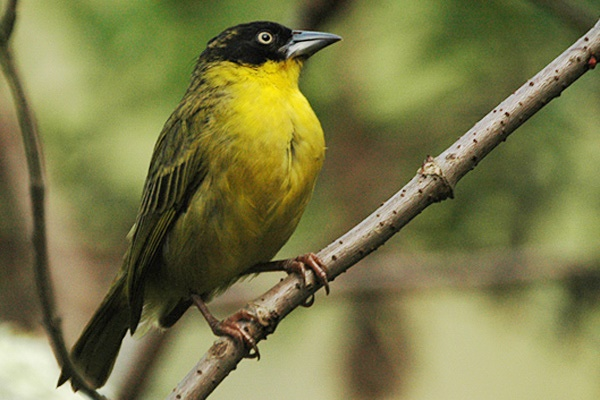
Stuhlmann's weaver (P. b. stuhlmanni) in Bwindi Impenetrable NP, Uganda
