= Rongo, Kenya =

Town in Kenya

Coordinates: 0.757627°S 34.599123°E

Rongo or Rongo town is located in the southwestern part of Kenya in Migori County, Kenya. It is situated approximately 30 kilometers northeast of Migori town along the Kisii-Migori highway.

Rongo has a diverse population that includes the Luo community, which is the dominant ethnic group, along with other communities. The population is a mix of locals and individuals from different parts of Kenya, especially due to the university and other business opportunities.

In the 2009 National Census, Rongo had a total population of 82,066 with 12,355 in the urban core and by 2019, the population had grown to 124,587, according to the National Census.

Rongo attracts lots of investors due to its massive gold mineral deposits since decades and also due to its positioning along the highway that connects Kenya to Tanzania through Sirare/Isbania Border post. In 2023, construction of the Rongo - Kisii road stalled temporarily after area residents discovered gold deposits in murram that was excavated to pave way for the construction.

== Infrastructure ==
- Basic utilities such as electricity, water, and healthcare services are available.
- Rongo is connected by road, with public transportation options such as buses and motorcycles, commonly known as boda-boda, readily available. Its location along a major highway that connects Kenya and Tanzania, facilitates easier movement of goods, services, and people.

== Economy ==
- Agriculture - Rongo economy is mostly agricultural with many of its dwellers engaging in farming crops such as maize, sugarcane, and tobacco.
- Trade - Rongo is spotted with several markets and businesses which contribute to its role as a commercial center. Local markets provide a platform for farmers to sell their produce and for traders to engage in retail activities.
- The presence of Rongo University has also contributed majorly to the economic growth and development of Rongo by attracting students and staff from various parts of the country who eventually contributing to the economy.

== Education ==
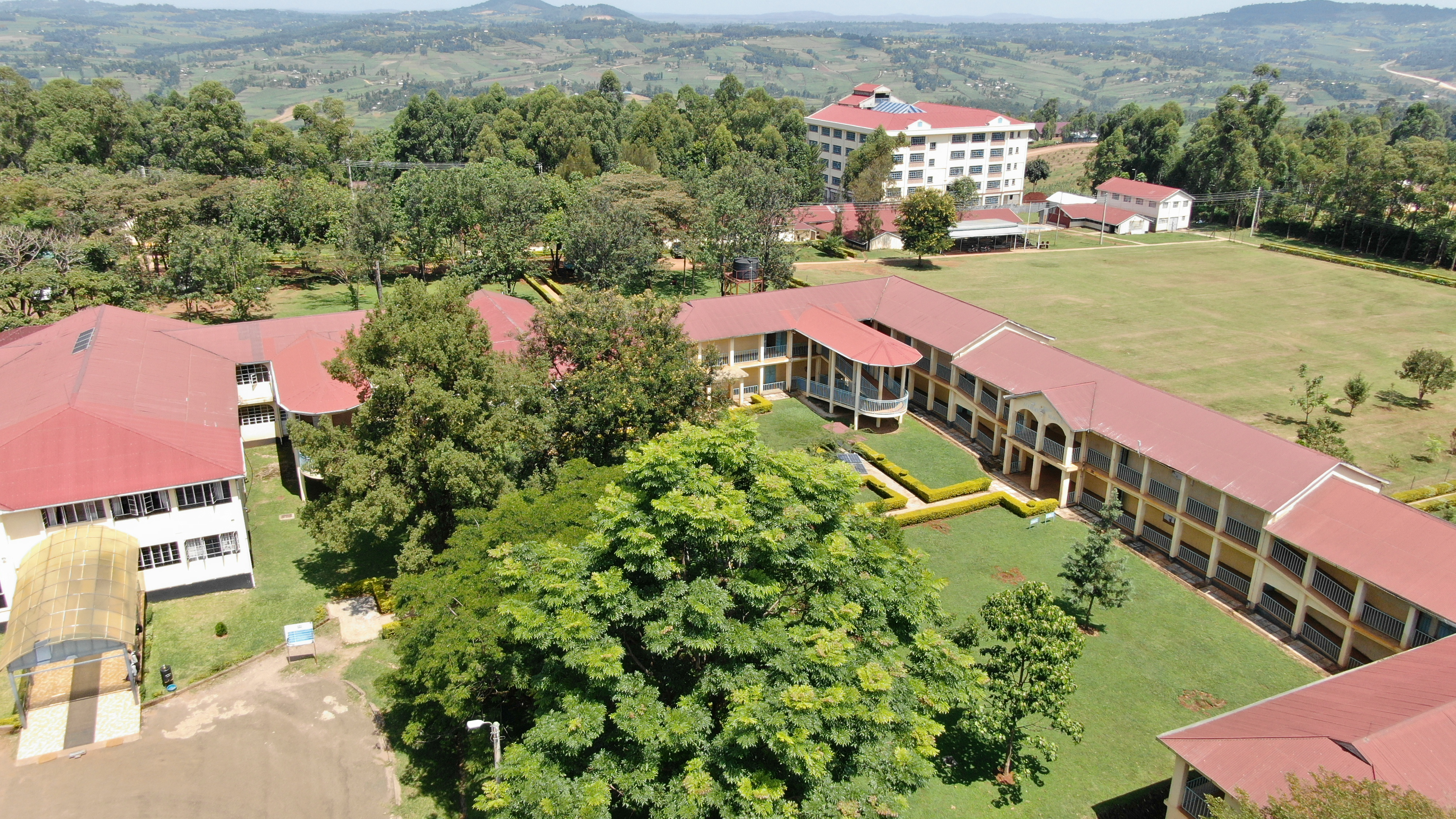
Aerial view of Rongo University main campus

Rongo town is the home for Rongo University. Rongo University (RU), formerly Rongo University College, is a public university and was awarded Charter to full fledged university by H.E. Hon. Uhuru Kenyatta, the President of the Republic of Kenya on 7 October 2016. The University derives its mandate from the Rongo University Charter of 7 October 2016, which stipulates the objects and functions including teaching research and community service.

Rongo University (RU) is located 8 km outside Rongo town. It was formerly a constituent college of Moi University. RU was founded in 2011. The site was formerly used as Moi Institute of Technology, established in 1981. Rongo is also home to St. Magdalene Teachers College.

== Social and Cultural Life ==
- Rongo is largely inhabited by the Luo community, and as such, most of the cultural practices and customs reflect Luo traditions. The town is characterised by a strong sense of community and a vibrant cultural life, with local customs and traditions playing a significant role in the daily lives of its residents.
- The majority of Rongo's population is Christian, with various denominations represented within the community. Due to its diverse population, other religions are also present, reflecting the town’s inclusivity and cultural variety.
