= Kuria =

Kuria may refer to:

- Kuria people, an ethnic group of Tanzania and Kenya
- Kuria District, a former district in Kenya
  - Kuria Constituency
- Kuria, a Kenyan name from the Kikuyu people
  - Gibson Kamau Kuria (born 1947), Kenyan lawyer
  - Manasses Kuria (1929–2005), Kenyan Anglican Archbishop
  - Ruth Wanjiru Kuria (born 1981), Kenyan long-distance road runner
- Kuria (islands), the collective name of the Kiribati islands of Buariki and Oneeke
- Kuria Muria, another name for the Khuriya Muriya Islands of Oman
- Kuria, variant of kyria, κυρία, the Greek title of respect for a woman. See Kira (given name).
- Kuria, a collection of Orokin statues in Warframe
- Kúria, the Hungarian name for the Curia of Hungary, sometimes used in English
