= Machage =

Machage is a Kenyan surname. Notable people with the surname include:

- Sospeter Machage (born 1956), Kenyan diplomat
- Wilfred Machage (1956–2022), Kenyan politician

== See also ==
- Machame
