= Mina Chang =

American singer and former government official (born 1984)

Mina Chang Harriman
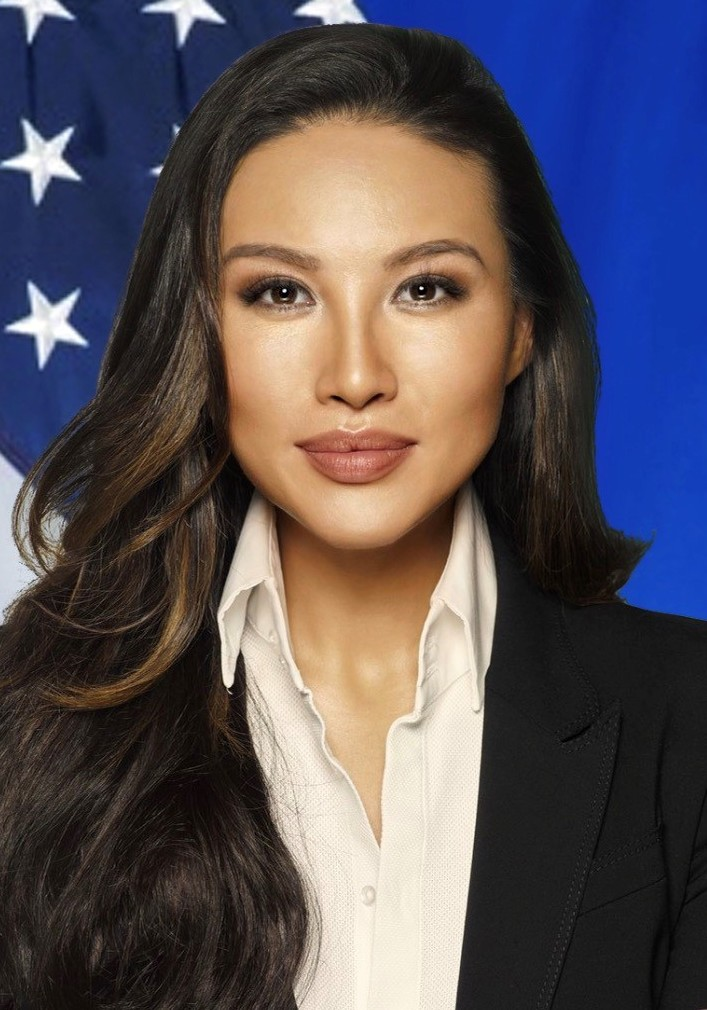
- Born: Mina Chang; October 29, 1984 (age 42)
- Known for: Political appointee of Donald Trump at the State Department
- Spouse: Jake Harriman

Mina Chang Harriman (born October 29, 1984) is an American singer, activist, and former government official. She served as the Deputy Assistant Secretary of the United States Department of State's Bureau of Conflict and Stabilization Operations from April 2019 until her resignation on November 18, 2019, after NBC News reported that she had falsified her resume with multiple false or misleading claims about her education, charity work, and appearance on a Time magazine cover. Chang also failed to mention that her charity's nonprofit status had been revoked.

== Early life and education ==
Chang, a Korean-American, claims to be the child of two Salvation Army officers and allegedly spent her childhood in Atlanta. In a May 2014 interview, Chang claimed to hold a degree in international development from the University of Hawaiʻi, concentrating on mission work and aid practices. The university, however, publicly stated days later that it does not have a Mina Chang of her age in their records and does not offer a "degree in international development." However, she did attend a university in Hawaii called the University of the Nations, an unaccredited Christian educational institution that specializes in International Development or cross-cultural missions.

She completed a seven-week program through Harvard Business School's Advanced Management Program (AMP).

== Career ==
Before 2010, Chang performed as a pop singer, touring internationally and recording albums in both English and Korean. During this time, she did volunteer work in relief efforts, which led to her joining the Korea-based nonprofit "Linking the World". Somewhere between 2012 and 2014, she purportedly became the president and CEO of the nonprofit, consolidating and relocating its offices to Dallas.

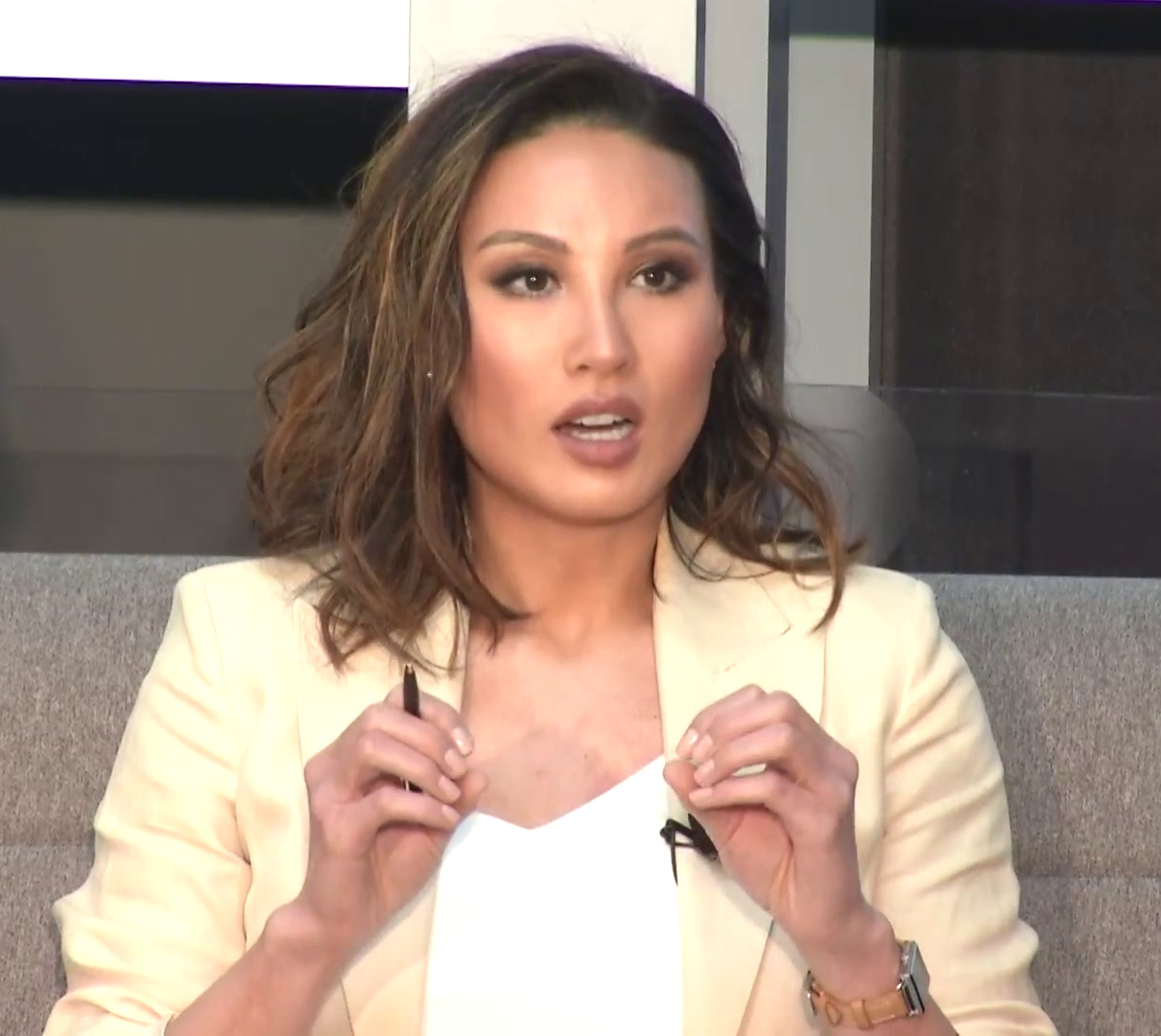
Chang at New America's Future of War Conference 2017

In January 2017, Chang spoke at the Asia Society Texas Center's Women's Leadership Series as a featured guest. Writer Kimberly Chuck called Chang a "renowned humanitarian".

On January 16, 2019, the Trump administration nominated Chang to be the Assistant Administrator of the United States Agency for International Development. The nomination was withdrawn on September 9, 2019.

On April 29, 2019, Chang was appointed Deputy Assistant Secretary in the U.S. State Department's Bureau of Conflict and Stabilization Operations, and stepped down from her president and CEO positions at Linking the World.

In July 2019, Town & Country and The Philippine Star speculated that Chang might become the next United States Ambassador to the Philippines. However, that prediction did not come to fruition.

== Falsification of resume ==
On November 12, 2019, NBC News reported that Chang had "embellished her résumé with misleading claims about her professional background" before joining the United States Department of State. She claimed to be an alumna of Harvard Business School, which the school verified as correct, by completing a non-degree certificate course. NBC News accused her of falsely claiming to be a former chief of staff of a nonprofit (INGO), to have had a role on a UN panel, and to have appeared on the front cover of Time magazine. The NBC News report also states that she claimed to have spoken at both Democratic and Republican national conventions, and that her resume implies she had testified before Congress.

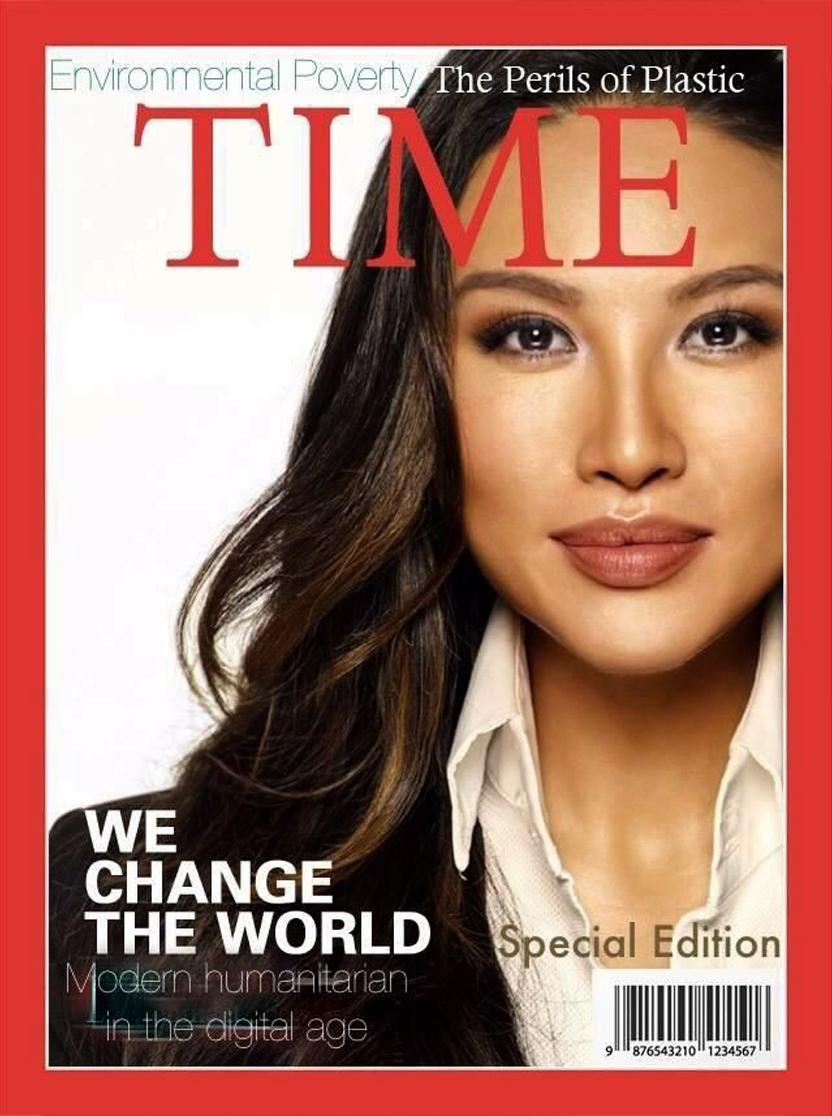
Chang's fake Time magazine cover

Chang displayed a fake cover of Time magazine to a videotaped January 2017 interview with journalist Mary Sit produced by Houston Community College's show, Global Outlook. In response to the interviewer's question: "Here you are on Time magazine, congratulations! Tell me about this cover and how this came to be?" Chang represented the cover as genuine and replied: "We started using drone technology in disaster response, and so that was when the whole talk of how is technology being used to save lives in disaster response scenarios... and I suppose I brought some attention to that".

Chang's State Department biography remained unchanged following the NBC News report until it was removed on November 18, 2019. It claimed that she was an "alumna of the Harvard Business School" and held undergraduate degrees from Southern Methodist University and the University of the Nations, an unaccredited Christian school with volunteer teachers. Chang also claimed to be a graduate of the United States Army War College National Security Seminar, a Harvard John F. Kennedy School of Government Senior Executive in National and International Security, and a former International Security Fellow at New America.

=== Resignation from the State Department ===
On November 18, 2019, Chang resigned from her role at the United States Department of State. In her resignation letter, Chang claimed that "character assassination based solely on innuendo was launched against me attacking my credentials and character. My superiors at the Department refused to defend me, stand up for the truth or allow me to answer the false charges against me."

== Personal life ==
Mina Chang is married to Jake Harriman. Harriman is a graduate of the U.S. Naval Academy and served in the Marine Corps. He founded Nuru International. Chang has a daughter named Trinity from her previous marriage.

== Discography ==
=== Albums ===
Title	Album details	Ref.
Mina Chang: The Holiday Album	Released: November 1, 2009; Label: Fischer; Formats: CD, digital download	
