= The Path to 9/11 =

- Genre: Drama, History
- Screenplay by: Cyrus Nowrasteh
- Directed by: David L. Cunningham
- Starring: Harvey Keitel; Donnie Wahlberg; Stephen Root; Barclay Hope; Patricia Heaton; Shirley Douglas; Penny Johnson Jerald; Dan Lauria; Amy Madigan; Michael Murphy; Trevor White; William Sadler; Shaun Toub
- Theme music composer: John Cameron
- Country of origin: United States
- Original language: English

Production
- Producers: Marc Platt; Nigel Lythgoe
- Cinematography: Joel Ransom
- Running time: 240 minutes
- Production companies: Marc Platt Productions; Nigel Lythgoe Productions; Touchstone Television
- Budget: $40 million

Original release
- Network: ABC
- Release: September 10 – September 11, 2006

The Path to 9/11 is a two-part miniseries that aired in the United States on ABC on September 10–11, 2006 and in other countries. The film dramatizes the 1993 World Trade Center bombing in New York City and the events leading up to the September 11, 2001, terrorist attacks. The film was written by screenwriter Cyrus Nowrasteh, and directed by David L. Cunningham, and stars Harvey Keitel and Donnie Wahlberg.

The film was nominated for multiple Emmy Awards. It won the 2007 Emmy for Outstanding Single Camera Picture Editing. It also won the 2007 Eddie Award for Best Edited Miniseries.

The film was controversial and received substantial criticism from terrorism experts and individuals portrayed within the series for including fictitious events, misrepresentations, and historical inaccuracies.

== Plot ==
The miniseries presented a dramatization of the sequence of events leading to the September 11 attacks in 2001 by Al-Qaeda on the United States, starting from the 1993 World Trade Center bombing and up to the minutes after its collapse in 2001. The movie takes the point of view of two main protagonists: John P. O'Neill, and a composite Central Intelligence Agency (CIA) agent, "Kirk".

O'Neill was the real-life Special Agent in charge of Al Qaeda investigations at the Federal Bureau of Investigation; he died in the collapse of the Twin Towers on September 11 shortly after retiring from the Federal Bureau of Investigation (FBI) and taking the position of Director of Security for the World Trade Center. The composite CIA agent "Kirk" is shown dealing with various American allies, especially Northern Alliance leader Ahmed Shah Massoud, in Afghanistan. In addition, "Patricia", a CIA headquarters analyst, represents the views of the rank and file at CIA headquarters.

The miniseries features dramatizations of various incidents summarized in the 9/11 Commission Report and represented in high-level discussions held in the Clinton and Bush administrations. The final hour of the movie dramatizes the events of 9/11, including a recreation of the second plane hitting the World Trade Center, Tom Burnett's calls to his wife, and John Miller's reporting near the scene of the attacks. The film concludes with information about the 9/11 Commission's recommendations, as well as the performance evaluation the Commission gave the government when it reconvened in 2005.

== Cast ==
- Harvey Keitel as FBI Special Agent John P. O'Neill, Terrorism, and subsequently Head of Security at WTC
- Donnie Wahlberg as CIA Field Agent Kirk, Composite
- Mido Hamada as Ahmad Shah Massoud, Afghan Opposition Leader Against The Taliban
- Stephen Root as Richard Clarke
- Barclay Hope as John Miller
- Frank John Hughes as DSS Special Agent Bill Miller, Regional Security Officer U.S. Embassy Islamabad
- Patricia Heaton as Barbara Bodine, U.S. Ambassador to Yemen
- Shirley Douglas as U.S. Secretary of State Madeleine Albright
- Margaret Long as Secretary to The President
- Penny Johnson Jerald as U.S. National Security Advisor Condoleezza Rice {reprising her role from DC 9/11: Time of Crisis}
- Dan Lauria as George Tenet (Director of Central Intelligence)
- Amy Madigan as Patricia Carver, Composite CIA Headquarters Analyst
- Michael Murphy as fmr. U.S. Secretary of Defense William Cohen
- Trevor White as Scott Ramer
- William Sadler as Neil Herman
- Shaun Toub as Emad Salem
- Wendy Crewson as Valerie James
- Stephanie Moore as Deanna Burnett
- Michael Benyaer as Khalid Sheikh Mohammed
- Martin Brodie as Mohamed Atta, 9/11 leader piloted American Airlines Flight 11 after the hijacking
- Nayef Rashed as Ayman al-Zawahiri, Al-Qaeda Leader
- Fulvio Cecere as Joe Dunne
- Marie V. Cruz as Aida Fariscal
- David Zayas as Lou Napoli
- David Huband as Charley
- Kevin Dunn as U.S. National Security Advisor Sandy Berger
- Nabil Elouahabi as Ramzi Yousef, World Trade Center Bomber
- Enis Esmer as Mohammed Salameh
- Moe Fawaz as Majed Moqed
- Akin Gazi as Mohamed Rashed Daoud Al-Owhali
- Youssef Kerkour as Mahmud Abouhalima
- Sam Lupovich as Khalid al-Mihdhar
- David Michie as Nicholas Lanier, Composite ABC Middle East correspondent
- Hani Noureldin as Nawaf al-Hazmi
- Armando Riesco as John Atkinson
- Neil Crone as Dorsey
- George R. Robertson as Vice President Dick Cheney
- Al Sapienza as Donald Sadowy
- Katy Selverstone as Nancy Floyd
- Jean Yoon as Betty Ong, Flight Attendant
- Azdin Zaman as Abdulaziz al-Omari
- Gabe Fazio as J. P. O'Neill, son of John O'Neill
- Nicky Guadagni as Mary Jo White
- Riz Ahmed as Yosri
- Moody el-Karaouni as Waleed al-Shehri
- Tareef Marrel as Wail al-Shehri
- Noam Jenkins as Marwan al-Shehhi
- Tarik Ben Ali as Ziad Jarrah

== Production ==
According to ABC, the movie is based on the "9/11 Commission Report and other sources", including interviews and news accounts. The first indication that ABC was running a miniseries appeared in a brief article in the New York Post. In it, the producers identified shooting locations and revealed that Harvey Keitel would play John O'Neill. At the time, ABC had a working name of Untitled Commission Report and the producers used the working title Untitled History Project, with the project beginning filming in July 2005 and scheduled to end post production by January 2006. Preview screenings were made in May for foreign broadcasters.

According to Advertising Age, the miniseries was a personal project of ABC entertainment president Steve McPherson, who began to look for a producer shortly after reading the 9/11 Commission Report.

The White House asked the major networks for airtime to present a Presidential Address to the nation. The interruption delayed the broadcast of the second half of Path to 9/11 by approximately 20 minutes in the Eastern and Central Time Zones. Otherwise, the movie aired without any interruption.

Filming was conducted in Morocco, New York City, Toronto, Hamilton, Ontario and Washington, D. C. The production was one of the few allowed to film at the headquarters of the Central Intelligence Agency in Langley, Virginia.

== Historical accuracy ==
ABC received a range of criticism from terrorism experts and people portrayed in the film that The Path to 9/11 contained false scenes, distorted events and misrepresented actions of people. ABC received letters from Richard Clarke, Chief Executive Officer Bruce R. Lindsey of the William J. Clinton Foundation, and Douglas J. Band, Counselor to President Clinton, Samuel R. Berger, Madeleine Albright, John Beug, Democratic Representatives John Conyers Jr., John Dingell, Jane Harman, Louise Slaughter, and others. Before the miniseries aired, some screeners of The Path to 9/11 asserted that certain scenes misrepresented the real-life events upon which they were said to be based, and that some scenes were complete fabrications.

=== 9/11 Commission members ===
Members of the 9/11 Commission criticized the accuracy of the film. In response to one particular scene, commission chair Thomas Kean told an interviewer he "was all right with the made-up scene" where the Clinton administration is accused of blocking a chance to kill bin Laden, saying "I don't think the facts are clear." Just weeks before the broadcast he "asked for changes that would address complaints raised by the former Clinton aides and that ABC is considering his request."

Commission member Richard Ben-Veniste said that the miniseries misrepresented facts presented in the 9/11 Commission report.

=== Criticisms of historical inaccuracy by FBI consultants ===
Two FBI agents refused advisory roles on the film, with one criticizing the film for creating a work of fiction and claiming it was inaccurate. Thomas E. Nicoletti had been hired by the filmmakers as a consultant, but quit because "There were so many inaccuracies...I'm well aware of what's dramatic license and what's historical inaccuracy," Nicoletti said. "And this had a lot of historical inaccuracy.'"

Dan Coleman, who retired from the FBI in 2004, said he also was concerned when he read the script in the summer of 2005 after being approached by producers about being a technical advisor. He described, "They sent me the script, and I read it and told them they had to be kidding," Coleman said. "I wanted my friends at the FBI to still speak to me." Coleman went on to say he did not want to be "haunted" by deceased colleagues who were falsely portrayed.

=== Berger scene ===
Besides criticism of an inaccurate script, other fictional and inaccurate scenes were created by the cast. In the film, CIA agents who have infiltrated bin Laden's Afghan compound try to put an assassin named Kirk (Donnie Wahlberg) in contact with National Security Advisor Sandy Berger (Kevin Dunn); Berger, who was later convicted of illegally removing and destroying documents regarding the subject from the National Archives, is portrayed as "dithering" before hanging up on the agents. The scene was strongly contradicted by both Berger and the 9/11 Commission, including commission member Richard Ben-Veniste.

=== Former Secretary of State Albright questions her portrayal ===
Another scene in question supposedly portrays Madeleine Albright refusing to shoot missiles at Osama bin Laden without authority from Pakistan and eventually getting "permission" from them against the military's wishes. Albright insists that this is completely inaccurate. As Secretary of State, Albright had no involvement in military decisions.

=== Inaccuracies regarding airline travel ===
In the opening scene of the film, American Airlines is depicted as ignoring a security warning regarding hijacker Mohamed Atta. The airline involved was actually U.S. Airways (although the airline later merged with American Airlines in 2015).

According to the 9/11 Commission Report: "While Atta had been selected by CAPPS [a security warning at a U.S. Airway ticket counter] in Portland [Maine] three members of... [Atta's] hijacking team - Suqami, Wail al Shehri, and Waleed al Shehri - were selected [at an American Airline counter] in Boston. Their selection affected only the handling of their checked bags, not their screening at the checkpoint. All five men cleared the checkpoint and made their way to the gate for American 11."

As a result of the inaccuracy, American Airlines stated they planned to pull all advertising from the ABC network and were considering legal action.

=== Alleged assassination opportunities not used by Clinton ===
Critics claim many inaccuracies in the film, including the depiction of the Clinton administration. For example, in one scene, former National Security Advisor Sandy Berger is portrayed as unwilling to approve a plan to take out a surrounded Osama bin Laden. He leaves it to former CIA Director George Tenet to decide if he will take responsibility. In the original version of the film, Berger hangs up the phone on Tenet, and Tenet calls off the operation:

The idea that someone had bin Laden in his sights in 1998 or any other time and Sandy Berger refused to pull the trigger, there's zero factual basis for that.

Cyrus Nowrasteh, script writer for the film, has said that the abrupt hang-up portrayed was not in the script and was instead improvised. It was later removed from the version shown in the United States. When asked if he thought of the script as a "historical document," Nowrasteh has responded:

No, but I stand by the original version of the movie, and I stand by the edited version... There has to be conflation of events. The most obvious problem any dramatist faces is that of sheer length. I had to collapse the events of eight and a half years into five hours. I don't know any other way to do it except collapse, conflate, and condense.

Anti-terrorism expert Richard Clarke said the film was "180 degrees from what happened" and made the following criticisms of the film:

1. Contrary to the movie, no US military or CIA personnel were in Afghanistan to have spotted bin Laden. When asked about this apparent discrepancy, Nowrasteh stated, "I've interviewed CIA agents who have told me otherwise. But that is the one concession we made. [In the original,] we had a CIA agent on the ground near bin Laden's compound—inside the wall even—and we took that out for the final presentation."
2. Contrary to the movie, the head of the Northern Alliance, Ahmad Shah Massoud, was nowhere near the alleged bin Laden camp and therefore could not have seen Osama bin Laden.
3. Contrary to the movie, Tenet actually said that he could not recommend a strike on the camp because the information was single sourced, and there would be no way to independently confirm bin Laden's presence in the target area by the time an already launched cruise missile would have reached it.

A member of the 9/11 Commission, Richard Ben-Veniste also stated that the scene depicting Berger hanging up the phone on Tenet is fictional.

Michael Scheuer, former head of the CIA Bin Laden Unit during the Clinton administration, a critic of President George W. Bush's Iraq policy, says it was not Berger who canceled assaults on bin Laden, but rather Clarke on Clinton's behalf. Scheuer states, "Mr. Clarke, of course, was at the center of Mr. Clinton's advisers, who resolutely refused to order the CIA to kill bin Laden. In spring 1998, I briefed Mr. Clarke and senior CIA, Department of Defense, and FBI officers on a plan to kidnap bin Laden. Mr. Clarke's reaction was that "it was just a thinly disguised attempt to assassinate bin Laden." I replied that if he wanted bin Laden dead, we could do the job quickly. Mr. Clarke's response was that the president did not want bin Laden assassinated, and that we had no authority to do so".

=== Clinton responds ===
Clinton pointedly refuted several fictionalized scenes that he claims insinuate he was too distracted by the Monica Lewinsky sex scandal to care about bin Laden and that a top adviser pulled the plug on CIA operatives who were just moments away from bagging the terror master, according to a letter to ABC boss Bob Iger obtained by The Post. The Clinton administration postponed a second air strike attempt on bin Laden due to hundreds of children reported to be in the area.

The former president also disputed the portrayal of then-Secretary of State Madeleine Albright as having tipped off Pakistani officials that a strike was coming, giving bin Laden a chance to flee.

"The content of this drama is factually and incontrovertibly inaccurate and ABC has the duty to fully correct all errors or pull the drama entirely," the four-page letter said.

=== Response from Barbara Bodine ===
On September 8, former Ambassador to Yemen Barbara Bodine complained in a Los Angeles Times Op-Ed about her portrayal in the film: "According to the mythmakers, a battle ensued between a cop obsessed with tracking down Osama bin Laden and a bureaucrat more concerned with the feelings of the host government than the fate of Americans and the realities of terrorism. I know this is false. I was there. I was the ambassador." The ABC miniseries compressed Bodine's role (played by Patricia Heaton) to a single extended scene, suggesting she was dismissive, hostile, and vulgar toward FBI investigator John O'Neill from the moment of his October 2000 arrival in Yemen (see USS Cole bombing).

=== Errors and other criticism ===
In addition to the fictionalized scenes and misrepresentations, preview copies contained several smaller errors that prompted criticism that the film is sloppy in its fidelity to facts. For example, a caption in the film misspelled Madeleine Albright's name. Another example is a scene portraying a warning popping up on a computer when Mohamed Atta boarded American Airlines Flight 11 in Boston. The scene was factually inaccurate; Atta actually boarded a connecting U.S. Airways flight in Portland, Maine.

During production of the movie, there was a controversy in the Toronto media over the use of discarded medical charts and records as document props. The Information and Privacy Commissioner for the province of Ontario launched an investigation and the producers destroyed footage including the garbage and sent all remaining documents to a shredding service for disposal.

Republican William Bennett joined those saying there is "no reason to falsify the record" or "falsify conversations". During an appearance on CNN he called on ABC to correct the inaccuracies of the show and for fellow conservatives to join him in such a demand.

On December 22, 2006 Media Matters for America named ABC as "Misinformer" of 2006 for, among other things in The Path to 9/11, calling it:

...a two-part miniseries that placed the blame for the September 11, 2001, terrorist attacks on the Clinton administration and whitewashed some of the Bush administration's failures leading up to the attacks.

=== Responses from cast and crew ===
Harvey Keitel, who plays John P. O'Neill—the lead role in the film, said he was told that the script was "history" project, but "it turned out not all the facts were correct" and by the time ABC tried to "heal the problem" it was "too late." In an interview two weeks before the film was to air he said more scenes needed to be corrected because "you cannot cross the line from a conflation of events to a distortion of the event." Keitel also said there was "discussion" and "argument" on-set during the filming about what was truthful and what was not, and that he disagreed with certain decisions.

Producer Marc Platt has acknowledged that the script was based in part on a book co-written by a Bush administration official. The book, The Cell: Inside the 9/11 Plot, and Why the FBI and CIA Failed to Stop It was co-written by John Miller, who serves as the assistant director of public affairs for the FBI.

Script writer Cyrus Nowrasteh said it was "an objective telling of the events of 9/11."

== Controversy ==
=== Advance viewing copies selectively distributed ===
The extensive pre-broadcast controversy over the film was based on content that was present in viewing copies sent to conservative political groups, talk show hosts and bloggers, including radio personalities such as Rush Limbaugh, and conservative movie critic Michael Medved. The office of former president Clinton repeatedly requested a preview copy, but was denied one, as was former Secretary of State Madeleine Albright. An unfinished version was shown to select members of the National Press Club in Washington, DC, and to attendees of the Midwest Security and Police Conference in Chicago.

According to Jay Carson, a spokesman for Bill Clinton, Clinton's office requested a copy of the movie so that they could view it before it aired, but the request was denied. Carson has also stated that Madeleine Albright and Sandy Berger had also requested copies and had also not received them.

This prompted Albright and Berger to write letters to ABC asking why they had not received copies and why ABC chose to run a movie whose accuracy was highly in question.

In addition to requesting an answer, Albright also stated the following reason for wanting a copy:

For example, one scene apparently portrays me as refusing to support a missile strike against bin Laden without first alerting the Pakistanis; it further asserts that I notified the Pakistanis of the strike over the objections of our military. Neither of these assertions is true. In fact, The 9/11 Commission Report states (page 117), "Since the missiles headed for Afghanistan had had to cross Pakistan, the Vice Chairman of the Joint Chiefs was sent to meet with Pakistan's army chief of staff to assure him the missiles were not coming from India. Officials in Washington speculated that one or another Pakistani official might have sent a warning to the Taliban or Bin Ladin.

=== Senate Democrats' letter to ABC ===
Senate Democratic leader Harry Reid, assistant Democratic leader Dick Durbin, Senator Debbie Stabenow, Senator Charles Schumer, and Senator Byron Dorgan sent a letter to Robert A. Iger, the president and CEO of the Walt Disney Company. Their letter includes the following statement:

Presenting such deeply flawed and factually inaccurate misinformation to the American public and to children would be a gross miscarriage of your corporate and civic responsibility to the law, to your shareholders, and to the nation. The Communications Act of 1934 provides your network with a free broadcast license predicated on the fundamental understanding of your principal obligation to act as a trustee of the public airwaves in serving the public interest. Nowhere is this public interest obligation more apparent than in the duty of broadcasters to serve the civic needs of a democracy by promoting an open and accurate discussion of political ideas and events.

=== Scholastic Press announcement ===
Scholastic Press, which had a deal with ABC to distribute "educational materials" based on the movie, pulled the materials in question from their website on September 7, substituting them with materials focusing on "critical thinking and media literacy skills".

Dick Robinson, chairman, president and CEO of Scholastic Press, had this to say on the matter:

After a thorough review of the original guide that we offered online to about 25,000 high school teachers, we determined that the materials did not meet our high standards for dealing with controversial issues... at the same time, we believe that developing critical thinking and media literacy skills is crucial for students in today's society in order to participate fully in our democracy and that a program such as 'The Path to 9/11' provides a very 'teachable moment' for developing these skills at the high school level. We encourage teachers not to shy away from the controversy surrounding the program, but rather to engage their students in meaningful, in-depth discussion.

=== Allegation of non-profit involvement ===
Allegations of religious involvement surfaced in 2006, when journalist Max Blumenthal commented on David Loren Cunningham and his former links to the international mission organization Youth with a Mission. David is the son of Youth with a Mission founder Loren Cunningham. This connection to Youth with a Mission, and past allegations of a political agenda within the organization, were mentioned by Blumenthal. He also noted the previous intentions of David Cunningham to 'revolutionize' film and television by founding an auxiliary group within Youth With A Mission called TFI (The Film Institute). Youth With A Mission International Chairman Lynn Green acknowledged the allegations, yet rebutted these concerns, insisting that the organization, "had nothing to do with financing the film, nor did any YWAM personnel have any influence on the content of the film."

=== Documentary revisits controversy ===
In August 2008, talk show host and documentary filmmaker John Ziegler and producer David Bossie of Citizens United premiered a documentary co-produced, written and directed by Ziegler entitled Blocking The Path to 9/11, which revisits the political controversy behind the ABC miniseries The Path to 9/11. Through interviews with the Path to 9/11 filmmakers and others, news clips regarding the controversy, and footage from the miniseries itself, the documentary argues not only that accusations of the filmmakers' covert political agenda were unfounded, but that they were generated by Clinton-era politicians concerned that the miniseries tarnished their political legacy, and were reported uncritically by bloggers and a biased news media. The documentary also asserts that Disney/ABC ultimately shelved plans to release a DVD of the miniseries as a result of pressure from the Democrats, specifically the Clintons themselves. As noted in the documentary, Disney/ABC denies this and claims the decision not to release a DVD was purely a business decision.

Jeffrey Ressner of Politico, wrote Blocking 'The Path to 9/11 mirrored the miniseries itself, because the documentary "raises even more questions and adds its own set of disconnected dots to this broadcasting dilemma".

== Awards ==
- 2007 Emmy Award: Outstanding Single Camera Picture Editing for a Miniseries or a Movie
- 2007 Emmy Award nominations: Outstanding Casting for a Miniseries, Movie or a Special; Outstanding Cinematography for a Miniseries or Movie; Outstanding Main Title Design; Outstanding Music Composition for a Miniseries, Movie or a Special (Original Dramatic Score); Outstanding Sound Editing for a Miniseries, Movie or a Special; Outstanding Special Visual Effects for a Miniseries, Movie or a Special
- 2007 American Cinema Editors Eddie Award: Best Edited Miniseries or Motion Picture for Commercial Television

== Release ==
The Path to 9/11 was originally broadcast on ABC over two nights. Part one aired on September 10, 2006 at 8:00 PM in a two-hour, 45-minute timeslot. The program was originally scheduled for a three-hour timeslot. Part two aired on September 11, 2006. The broadcast was interrupted by a primetime address from President George W. Bush. Both parts aired commercial-free. The miniseries was originally to be shown "with limited commercial interruption", but the network was unable to obtain sponsorship.

Part one of The Path to 9/11 was watched by 13 million viewers. The program came in second behind NBC's Sunday Night Football, which was watched by 20.7 million viewers. Path also aired against the documentary film 9/11 on CBS, which was watched by 10.6 million viewers. The first hour of part two of The Path to 9/11 received an 6.7/10 average rating. The second hour of part two, which was grouped with the presidential address, received an approximate 8.3/12 average rating. The "final 18 minutes" of part two, which was grouped with "a special edition of "Primetime"", received an approximate 7.2/12 average rating.

In the UK, the miniseries was broadcast on BBC Two in two parts on September 10 and 11, 2006. It also aired on the Seven Network in Australia, TV One in New Zealand, and Zee Studio in India on the same dates.

While the film was marketed in the US as a loose dramatization of events based on the 9/11 Commission Report, television advertising for the film in other countries called the film the "Official True Story". An Australian TV listing called the film "the story of exactly what happened", which later changed to "The thrilling dramatised investigation" as the airing time drew near.

=== Home media ===
As of 2026, the miniseries has not been officially released on DVD. In 2007, writer and producer Nowrasteh said the lack of DVD release was due to political pressure, and recalled an ABC Studios executive telling him, "if Hilary [Clinton] wasn't running for president, this wouldn't be a problem". An ABC spokeswoman stated a planned DVD release wasn't scheduled "at this time".

== Reception ==
Mike Kelley of The Blade wrote, "The miniseries is a powerful and well-constructed tale, though it's sometimes difficult to keep the characters straight and follow the action as it jumps from one part of the world to another". Conservative talk radio host Hugh Hewitt described the miniseries as "a very accurate docudrama" and stated it was "the first attempt — very successful — to convey to American television viewers what we are up against: The fanaticism, the maniacal evil, the energy and the genius for mayhem of the enemy". Similarly, L. Brent Bozell III of Townhall called the miniseries "a compelling, forceful docudrama", and wrote that both "Clinton and Bush officials come under fire, and if it seems more anti-Clinton, that's only because they were in office a lot longer than Team Bush before 9-11. [...] The film doesn't play favorites, and the Bush administration takes its lumps as well." Alessandra Stanley of The New York Times described the miniseries as "an unsparing, and at times hyperbolic, portrait of bureaucratic turf wars, buck passing and complacency".

== See also ==
- 9/11 Commission Report
- I Missed Flight 93
- Inside 9/11
- Special Bulletin
- The Day After
- The Reagans
