= Hakani: A Survivor's Story =

- Directed by: David Loren Cunningham
- Written by: Kevin Miller (story and screenplay)
- Starring: Cast of Indigenous people
- Release date: 2008
- Country: Brazil
- Language: Portuguese

Hakani is a 30-minute movie denouncing the occurrence of infanticide in tribal communities in Brazil. It was produced by ATINI and Youth With A Mission. The Brazilian government officials said "the missionaries are exaggerating and exploiting the issue to justify their attempts to convert Indians to Christianity". In 2009, Survival International released a statement that film is "faked, that the earth covering the children's faces is actually chocolate cake, and that the film's claim that infanticide among Brazilian Indians is widespread is false."

== Production team ==
The movie was an independent production supported by a variety of organizations from Brazil and abroad. Directed by David Loren Cunningham, (The Seeker: The Dark is Rising, After..., The Path to 9/11). Screenwriter, Kevin Miller (No Saints for Sinners, With God On Our Side, Trunk, Expelled: No Intelligence Allowed, After...).

Most of the docu-drama was shot at Jocum’s campus in the city of Porto Velho.

== Criticism ==
The film has been challenged by the Brazilian government’s Indian affairs department, FUNAI, which has requested the involvement of Brazil’s federal police in investigating whether the film breaks Brazilian law.

Other high-profile critics of the film include Survival International. The organization claims that the film is a tool for evangelical Christian groups to increase their ability to spread religious belief despite the Brazilian government's concerns about their methods. Survival also claims that the issue of Amazonian infanticide has been warped and inflated so people think that baby-killing is common, whereas it says that the practice is rare and mostly comparable to the medical practice of infant euthanasia, which, according to Survival International, is a fact of life in Western society. It is also argued that: "When Brazil's Indian tribes are being forced off their land or killed by ranchers, miners and loggers...the infanticide issue is a destructive distraction.". The Hakani Project offered refutations to these arguments.

In 2009, Sandra Terena, a journalist and documentarist with Indian heritage, inspired by “Hakani”, made a short documentary, “Quebrando o silêncio”, showcasing a group of Indians speaking out against infanticide and suggesting that these practices ultimately stem from a lack of education, arguing that if they are deemed cultural, then the culture must change.
