= DDB =

DDB may refer to:

- Dangerous Drugs Board, an agency of the Government of the Philippines
- DDB Worldwide, an advertising agency
- Digital Dictionary of Buddhism
- Dogue de Bordeaux, breed of dog
- Dortmund Data Bank, a factual data bank for thermophysical and thermodynamic data
- DDB, Bitmap graphics or Digidesign Database File, in the Alphabetical list of filename extensions
- DDB, distributed database, is a database in which storage devices are not all attached to a common processor.
- Deutsche Digitale Bibliothek
- D&D Beyond

== People ==
- Daryl Bonilla (born 1975), American actor, comedian and professional wrestler known as "Dangerous" Daryl Bonilla
- Daniel de Bourg, English pop singer
