= Benny Prasad =

- Born: Kandukuri Benny Prasad; 6 August 1975 (age 51); Bangalore, India
- Genres: Gospel, Instrumental
- Occupations: Musician, Missionary
- Instruments: Guitar, Bentar
- Years active: 2000–present
- Spouse: Zanbeni Odyuo
- Website: bennyprasad.com

Benny Prasad (born 6 August 1975) is a gospel musician and instrumental guitarist from India. He designed the bentar which is the world's first bongo guitar. He also holds the world record for being the fastest man ever to visit all the 245 nations (194 Sovereign, 51 Dependent nations including Antarctica) in the world.

Prasad has traveled all around the world performing to audiences. He has performed before presidents and parliaments, before the crowds of 2007 Military World Games, 2006 FIFA World Cup and the 2004 Olympic Games.

Prasad has also won renown by designing two guitars – the world's first bongo guitar and a 54 string guitar, the bentar.

He had traveled to all these countries in 6 years, 6 months and 22 days (from 1 May 2004 to 22 November 2010), and is therefore the fastest man ever to visit all 257 countries in the world.

== Early life ==
Born on 6 August 1975, in Bangalore, India, Benny Prasad studied in Kendriya Vidyalaya National Aerospace Laboratories. His father, a scientist at the National Aerospace Laboratories, spent a lot of time trying to drill mathematics and science into Prasad. He was expected to excel in his studies and to set an example for his younger brother and sisters.

As a young person he developed severe asthma which required him to take cortisone steroids and resulted in rheumatoid arthritis, 60% lung damage and a weakened immune system. Finding no fulfillment in life, Prasad soon became depressed and his behavior continued to worsen and he attempted suicide at the age of 16. Benny's mother convinced him to go to a retreat center.

Benny joined Youth with a Mission (YWAM) and completed a Discipleship Training School and School of Biblical Studies in Bangalore, India. After completing a School of Music in Missions in New Mexico, USA and a School of Events Management in Townsville, Australia, Benny received an Associate of Arts degree through YWAM's University of the Nations.

Benny currently lives in Bangalore, India. He is a member of the First Assembly of God Church.

== Discography ==
- I Surrender All (2000)
- In Moments Like These (2002)
- When the Music Fades (2004)
- Tribute to the Unknown God (2008)
