= Kuria Constituency =

Kenyan electoral constituency

Coordinates: 1.220°S 34.6372°E

Kuria Constituency is a former electoral constituency in Kenya since independence in 1963. It was after Chacha Sinda's (a Colonialist and Paramount chief) decades of leadership since 1899 to his controversial demise in 1940s. It was the only constituency in the former Kuria District. The constituency had 21 wards, all electing councilors to the Kehancha municipality. It has since been divided into Kuria West Constituency and Kuria East Constituency.

== Members of Parliament ==
Elections	MP	Party	Notes
1963	B. Chacha Maisori-Itumbo	KANU	
1969	Samson Mwita Marwa	KANU	One-party system
1974	B. Chacha Maisori-Itumbo	KANU	One-party system
1979	Walter Elijah Mwita	KANU	One-party system
1983	Walter Elijah Mwita	KANU	One-party system.
1988	Walter Elijah Mwita	KANU	One-party system.
1992	Shadrack R. M. Manga	KANU	
1997	Shadrack R. M. Manga	KANU	
2002	Wilfred Gisuka Machage	NARC	
2007	Wilfred Gisuka Machage	DP	
2013	Tuguti Moses Senso Kuria East-under Mr Maisori Itumbo - influence	KANU	

== Wards ==
Wards
Ward	Registered Voters
Bukira Central	21,120
Bukira East	32,730
Getambwega	19,340
Getong'anya	35,070
Gokeharaka	22,230
Gwitembe	16,380
Ikerege	24,820
Kebaroti	20,310
Kegonga	31,220
Kombe	6,280
Komosoko	23,290
Maeta	16,520
Masaba	17,440
Ntimaru	33,780
Nyabasi North	14,140
Nyabasi West	26,540
Isibania	49,940
Nyamosense	27,480
Siabai	12,770
Tagare	26,590
Wangirabose	15,780
Total	493,770
*September 2013.
