= Loren Cunningham =

American missionary (1935–2023)

Loren Duane Cunningham (June 30, 1935 – October 6, 2023) was an American missionary who was the founder of the international Christian missionary organization Youth With A Mission (YWAM) and the University of the Nations. Cunningham founded YWAM in Lausanne, Switzerland, in 1960 with his wife, Darlene Cunningham, at the age of 24. They resided in Kona, Hawaii, and were members of the YWAM Global Leadership Team.

== Early life ==
Loren Cunningham was born on June 30, 1935, in the oil boom town of Taft, California.

== Ministry ==
=== Youth With A Mission ===
While travelling in the Bahamas in 1956 as part of a gospel quartet, Cunningham claimed to have experienced a vision. In this vision, he described waves on the shorelines of the continents on a world map, eventually growing bigger and bigger, covering the landmass. He claimed that the waves in this vision changed to young people covering the continents, talking to people about their faith. This vision would inspire the beginning of Youth With A Mission four years later as a movement providing missionary opportunities for Christian youth after high school, regardless of their denomination.

Cunningham and his wife continued to have influence on the leadership of YWAM International, holding the title of Founders of the Mission. They were members of the YWAM Global Leadership Team and advisers to the Team 3 leadership of YWAM International.

=== University of Nations ===
In 1978, Cunnigham co-founded the University of the Nations in Kailua-Kona, Hawaii, with Howard Malmstadt.

== Seven Mountain Mandate ==
Along with fellow evangelist Bill Bright (founder of Campus Crusade for Christ) and theologian Francis Schaeffer, in 1975 Cunningham was one of the founders of what would later be termed the Seven Mountain Mandate. The idea would later go on to be popularized by Bethel Church pastor Bill Johnson and Lance Wallnau, among others. The concept centers around Christians taking dominion of seven societal spheres of influence: "family, religion, education, media, art, economics, and government."

== Death ==
Cunningham died on October 6, 2023, at the age of 88, at his home in Kailua-Kona, Hawaii.

== Bibliography ==
- Cunningham, L. (1984). Is That Really You, God?. YWAM Publishing. ISBN 1-57658-244-2.
- Cunningham, L. (1989). Making Jesus Lord. YWAM Publishing. ISBN 1-57658-012-1. (first published under the title Winning God's Way)
- Cunningham, L. (1991). Daring to Live on the Edge. YWAM Publishing. ISBN 0-927545-06-3.
- Cunningham, L.; Hamilton, J. D. (2000). Why Not Women?. YWAM Publishing. ISBN 1-57658-183-7.
- Cunningham, L. (2007). The Book That Transforms Nations. YWAM Publishing. ISBN 978-1-57658-381-4.

== See also ==
- David Loren Cunningham – Loren and Darlene's son
