= Gary M. Hieftje =

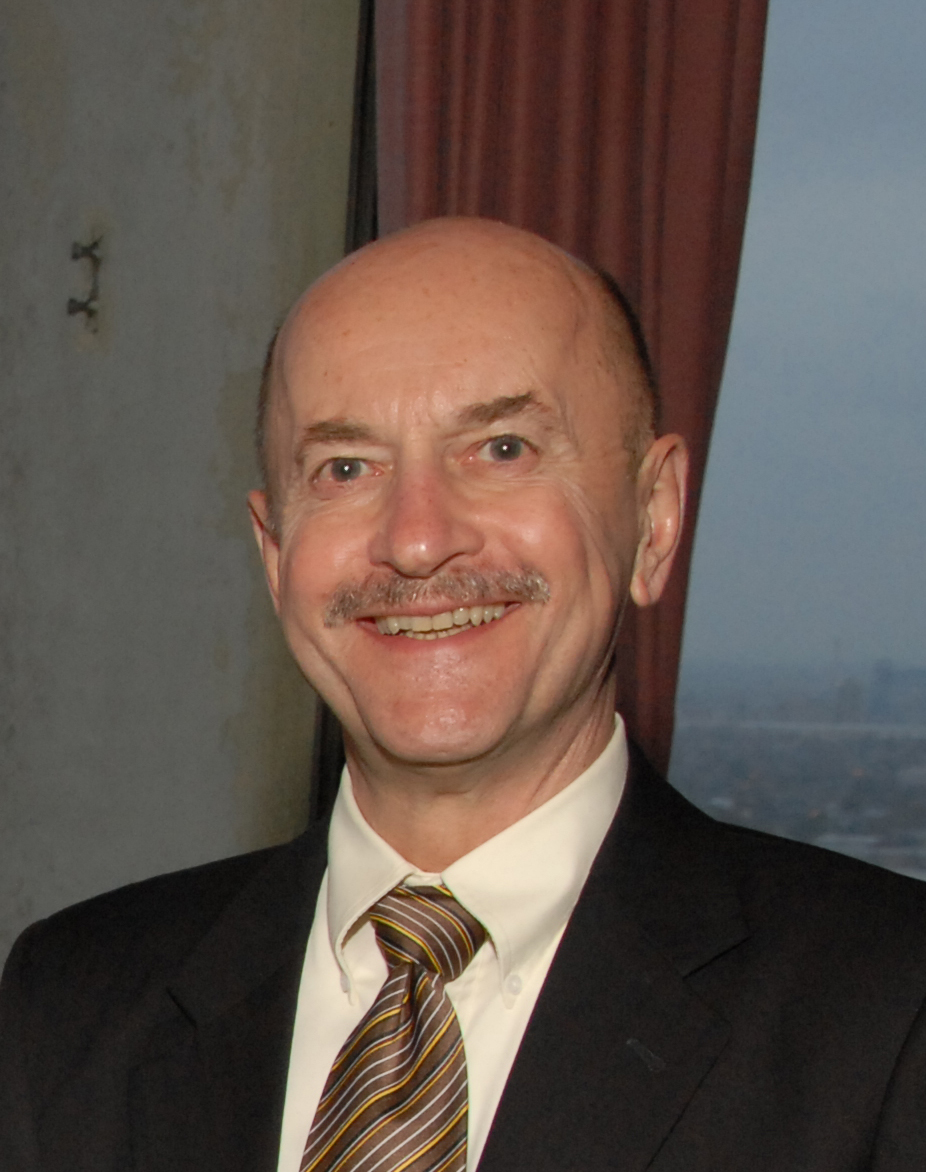
- Hieftje in 2008
- Education: Hope College (A.B., 1964); University of Illinois at Urbana–Champaign (PhD, 1969)
- Scientific career
- Fields: Chemistry
- Workplaces: Indiana University
- Thesis: A Unique System for Use in Studying Flame Spectrometric Processes (1969)
- Doctoral advisor: Howard Malmstadt
- Other academic advisors: Gerrit Van Zyl

Gary M. Hieftje is an analytical chemist, Distinguished Professor, and the Robert & Marjorie Mann Chair of Chemistry at Indiana University in Bloomington, Indiana. Gary M. Hieftje received his A.B. degree at Hope College in Holland, Michigan in 1964, and his PhD from University of Illinois at Urbana–Champaign in 1969. In 1969, he started his career in teaching and research at Indiana University. Hieftje was named a Distinguished Professor in 1985, and entered emeritus status in 2018. As of 2018, Dr. Hieftje has been involved in over 600 publications.

Research in the Hieftje Group mainly focuses on studying and improving the mechanisms and methods of atomic emission and absorption, fluorescence, and mass spectrometry. He also works to develop new methods of analysis for atoms, molecules, and biomolecules. His group even developed an online computer program to control their experiments. Some areas of interest to his research are: finding new applications of lasers, linear response theory, near-infrared correlation methods of analysis, time-resolved luminescence, and fiber-optic sensors.

Professor Hieftje has authored many books. Perhaps, the most well-known is “Chemical Separations and Measurements - The Theory and Practice of Analytical Chemistry” with colleagues Dennis G. Peters and John M. Hayes published by Saunders in Philadelphia in 1974.

== Awards and honors ==
- 1979 Can Test Award by the Chemical Institute of Canada
- 1983 Science & Engineering Research Council Senior Fellowship
- 1983 Co-recipient of an IR-100 Award
- 1984 Meggers Award by the Society for Applied Spectroscopy
- 1984 Lester W. Strock Award by the Society for Applied Spectroscopy
- 1984 Anachem Award
- 1985 Chemical Instrumentation Award by the American Chemical Society
- 1986 Pittsburgh Analytical Chemistry Award from the Royal Society of Chemistry
- 1986 Theophilus Redwood Award from the Royal Society of Chemistry
- 1987 American Chemical Society Award in Analytical Chemistry
- 1987 Tracy M. Sonneborn Teacher-Scholar Award from Indiana University
- 1987 Elected to Fellowship in the American Association for the Advancement of Science
- 1988 R&D 100 Award by Research & Development Magazine
- 1989 ACS Award in Spectrochemical Analysis from the Analytical Chemistry Division of the American Chemical Society
- 1989 Indiana Academy of Science, Fellow
- 1991 Received the Gold Medal of the Quality Control Academy of the Upjohn Company
- 1991 Pergamon/Spectrochimica Acta Atomic Spectroscopy Award
- 1992 Eastern Analytical Symposium Award for Outstanding Achievements in the Fields of Analytical Chemistry
- 1992 Awarded a second Lester W. Strock Award
- 1993 Distinguished Faculty Award from the College of Arts and Sciences alumni of Indiana University
- 1993 Golden Key National Honor Society, Honorary Member
- 1995 Honorary Professor of Jilin University, Jilin, China
- 1996 Humboldt Research Award for Senior U.S. Scientists
- 1996 Meggers Award from the Society for Applied Spectroscopy
- 1998 ACS-Analytical Division Award for Excellence in Teaching
- 1999 Awarded Honorary Membership in the Society for Applied Spectroscopy
- 1999-00 Director of the Linda and Jack Gill Center for Instrumentation and Measurement Science at Indiana University
- 2000 Appointed to the Robert and Marjorie Mann Chair of Chemistry
- 2000-01 Indiana Academy of Science Speaker of the Year
- 2001 Pittsburgh Spectroscopy Award
- 2002 Trustees Teaching Award at Indiana University
- 2004 New York Section of the Society for Applied Spectroscopy Gold Medal Award
- 2004 Monie A. Ferst Award (Sigma Xi)
- 2004 Society for Applied Spectroscopy, Fellow
- 2005 Royal Society of Chemistry, Fellow
- 2007 CSI XXXV Award, sponsored by Wiley
- 2009 Maurice Hasler Award
- 2010 USP Award for an Outstanding Contribution to the Standard-Setting Process
- 2010 Robert Boyle Prize for Analytical Science
- 2011 American Chemical Society (ACS) Fellow
- 2011 R&D 100 Award by Research and Development Magazine
- 2012 Distinguished Service Award by the American Chemical Society-Analytical Division
- 2012 Ralph and Helen Oesper Award by the University of Cincinnati
- 2020 Bicentennial Medal
