= Beyond Paradise (film) =

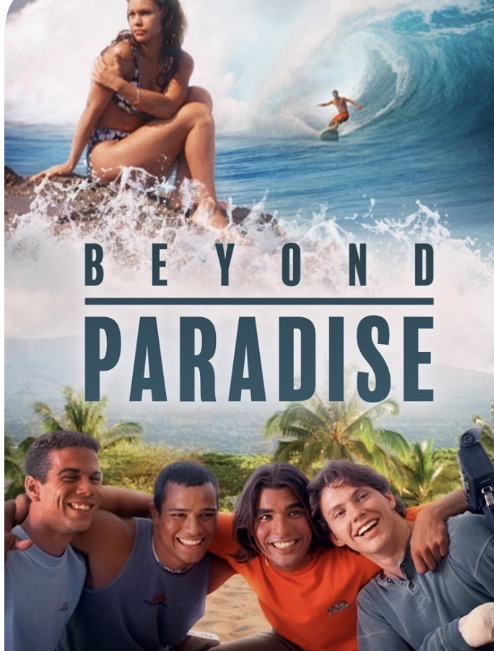
- 2026 Poster
- Directed by: David L. Cunningham
- Written by: David L. Cunningham; David Walker
- Produced by: Anthony Bozanich; David L. Cunningham
- Starring: Roy Newton; Kalani; Lorenzo Callender; Daryl Bonilla; Priscilla Basque
- Cinematography: Graham Driscoll; Russell Steen
- Edited by: Patrick Flannery; Thomas A. Ohanian
- Music by: Nicolás Rivera
- Release date: 1998
- Running time: 105 minutes
- Country: United States
- Languages: English; Hawaiian

Beyond Paradise is a 1998 American drama independent film directed by David L. Cunningham.

== Plot ==
The film is inspired by Cunningham's years in Hawaii. Mark Thompson (played by Roy Newton) leaves Los Angeles and moves with his mother to the Big Island and befriends three "locals", Ronnie (Lorenzo Callendar), Zulu (Kalani) and Keao (Daryl Bonilla). At the same time, he is bullied and harassed for being a "haole" or foreigner.

The three lead characters were also inspired by Cunningham's real life high school friends, as seen in the ending credits. The film is dedicated to Donald Boy (Ronnie), Zulu (Zulu), while Keao was a composite of two friends combining the humor of one friend and the drug element of another into one character.

== Production ==
Under the working title of "Kama'aina", the movie was filmed with a modest budget from December 26, 1996, to February 5, 1997. Cunningham had a hand in most aspects of the film's production, including distributing it.

== Release and reshooting ==
The movie premiered at the Honolulu International Film Festival in November 1997.

According to Variety, while the acting by the lead Newton in the film needed work (his three co-stars were praised), it was visually stunning and had an excellent soundtrack.

In 2022, the cast reunited on a zoom interview developed by Daniela Stolfi of 808 Viral, after numerous clips of the movie went viral. Cunningham announced he was in the process of writing the script for Beyond Paradise 2, that would feature many of the original cast.

After a few screenings in L.A., Cunningham shot some additional footage, including scenes involving Mark's father and his friends in L.A. The film had a limited theatrical release in 1999. The DVD did not come out until 2003; it does not include the scenes that were added for the 1999 release. The DVD lacks extras and commentaries, but includes the theatrical trailer.

== Sequel ==
On June 20, 2026, Director David Cunningham officially announced that Beyond Paradise 2 had been written and was in development. The announcement was made during a special screening of Beyond Paradise at the Honolulu Museum of Art, where Cunningham also revealed plans to launch a crowdfunding campaign to finance the production. Cunningham is collaborating with returning cast members Daryl Bonilla, Lorenzo Callender, and Daniela Stolfi of 808 Viral on the development and promotion of the sequel.
