= Youth With A Mission =

Christian missions training organisation

Youth With A Mission (YWAM)
- Founded: 1960; 66 years ago
- Founder: Loren and Darlene Cunningham
- Type: Christian interdenominational missionary association
- Website: ywam.org

Youth With A Mission (typically shortened YWAM, generally pronounced /ˈwaɪwæm/) is an interdenominational Christian mission organization with a focus on missionary work and training for Christian missions.

Founded by American missionary Loren Cunningham and his wife Darlene Cunningham in 1960, YWAM's stated purpose is to "know God and to make Him known". The organization pioneered self-funded short-term missions conducted by young people. Today, while maintaining its original youth-oriented ethos, the group has expanded its membership for those of older ages as well. While the efficacy and safety of YWAM's short-term missions has been called into question, the organization trains upwards of 25,000 short-term missions volunteers annually, accepting participants from across all Christian denominations, including Catholicism via its Kerygma Ministry.

Despite initial criticism for its unconventional approach, YWAM grew rapidly, becoming non-denominational in 1964 and establishing short-term volunteer teams, vocational missions, and training schools. Key milestones included the creation of the School of Evangelism in Switzerland (1969), the foundation of the University of the Nations, and the launch of Mercy Ships in 1978. By the 2000s, YWAM had over 11,000 staff from more than 130 countries, with programs extending into disaster relief, youth ministries, evangelism at international sporting events, and global partnerships with Christian organizations.

YWAM operates a range of programs including evangelism through sports, music, and drama, extensive training through the University of the Nations, and humanitarian aid via Mercy Ministries, Homes of Hope, and ship-based outreaches. The organization emphasizes the “Seven Mountain Mandate,” aiming to influence society's key sectors, though this has drawn theological and political criticism. YWAM has faced controversies involving allegations of spiritual and financial abuse, physical mistreatment, sexual misconduct, and doctrinal concerns. Its missionaries have also faced dangers abroad, including shootings, imprisonments, and kidnappings. It organizes events such as The Send to mobilize Christians worldwide.

== History ==
Youth With A Mission was conceived by Loren Cunningham in 1956. As a 20-year-old student in an Assemblies of God College, he was traveling in the Bahamas when he had a vision of a movement that would send young people out into various nations to share the message of Jesus, and which would involve Christians of all Christian denominations. Despite his ordination by the Assemblies of God, Cunningham's untraditional ideas were met with considerable criticism as denominational leaders pointed out problems with his plan to send young, inexperienced youth from many denominations, overseas.

Cunningham married Darlene Scratch in 1963. By this time, the new mission had 20 volunteers stationed in various nations, and the Cunninghams were planning the mission's first "Summer of 69". Later in the year, YWAM teams were sent to the West Indies, Samoa, Hawaii, Mexico, and Central America. In 1964, the organization became non-denominational.

By 1966, there were ten full-time YWAM staff including the founders and hundreds of seasonal volunteers. That year, YWAM ministries also began in New Zealand and Tonga. In late 1966, the name Youth With A Mission was chosen, and the group embarked on their first project, a vocational mission trip to Liberia, building a road through the jungle to a leper colony.

In 1967, Loren Cunningham began work on the organization's first summer school, the School of Evangelism. It was held in Chateau-d'Oex (Hotel Rosat), Switzerland in 1969 with 21 students. A second school ran from the summer of 1969 through the summer of 1970 just outside Lausanne, Switzerland, in Chalet-A-Gobet. The students' lodging and classes took place in a newly renovated leased hotel. By the end of the year, YWAM purchased the hotel and made Lausanne its first permanent location.

The School of Evangelism was formed in 1974 in New Jersey as well as Lausanne. With a focus on biblical foundations and character development as well as missions, much of the material from this course is now taught in the present day Discipleship Training School (DTS). A format of three months of lectures followed by two or three months of outreach is still used in most Discipleship Training Schools (sometimes known as the Discipleship Training Course or "DTC") today.

By 1970, YWAM had a total of 40 full-time staff. In early 1972, a small team headed to Munich, Germany, to begin preparations for an outreach during the 1972 Summer Olympics; YWAM stationed 1,000 people at Munich for the outreach during the Games, and would later go on to conduct other Olympic outreach programmes at later Games.

The University of the Nations online magazine has stated that Cunningham met scientist and professor Howard V. Malmstadt at a conference in 1974. Malmstadt and Cunningham started giving educational seminars together, and Cunningham asked Malmstadt to help expand the training arm of the mission. In 1977, YWAM purchased the Pacific Empress Hotel in Kona, Hawaii, and began renovations to turn it into the campus for the Pacific and Asia Christian University, the forerunner of University of the Nations.

By 1978, YWAM's Mercy Ships ministry was launched with the commissioning of the ship Anastasis (the Greek word for 'resurrection'). In 1984, the m/v Good Samaritan was added, in 1990 the m/v Pacific Ruby, then in 1994 the m/v Caribbean Mercy and finally in 2001 the m/v Pacific Link. Mercy Ships was pioneered by YWAM, but in 2003 was released as a separate organization. A New Zealand-based YWAM ship ministry, formerly a part of Mercy Ships called Marine Reach, which owned and operated the m/v Pacific Link continued to remain within the YWAM family and, over time, a number of ship equipped ministries sprouted up as part of the YWAM Ships network.

By the end of the 1980s, YWAM changed the name of its university to University of the Nations (U of N). The concept of a YWAM university that would encompass training programs in hundreds of YWAM locations was developed by Cunningham and Malmstadt. When communist regimes in Eastern Europe began to fall in the early 1990s, YWAM began outreaches to countries there, including Albania. In the 1990s, YWAM became a strong promoter of the 10/40 Window concept of evangelization and associated spiritual mapping prayer campaigns, which focused on praying on-site in specific locations to battle demons or territorial spirits.

By 2000, YWAM had over 11,000 staff from over 130 countries and had become almost 50 percent non-Western. Reflecting this diversity, in 1999, New Zealander Frank Naea, who has Samoan and Māori parentage, was chosen to become YWAM's first non-white president in 2000, replacing Jim Stier, who was to continue as international director of evangelism and frontier missions and national director for Brazil. In 2000, YWAM developed a new role of Executive chairman, which Jim Stier stepped into, and made the presidency a three-year rotating position. However, at a meeting in 2011, the organization's elders did away with the titles director, chairman, and president, in reference to all leadership roles except at the local level. By 2006, YWAM had joined the International Orality Network (ION), a multi-agency outreach effort to "the world's non-literate masses", employing verbal and dramatic means to introduce the Gospel to non-literate populations. In 2008, a number of mission organizations and church mission departments, including YWAM, started the Call To All movement, dedicated to completing the Great Commission in the modern day.

== Programs ==
=== Evangelism ===
Sports camps, drama presentations, musical events, volunteering, and other creative and performing arts are among the avenues through which volunteers and staff share their Christian faith.

=== International sporting event outreaches ===
Youth With A Mission has been active in evangelism at the World Olympic Games since 1972.

- 1972 Summer Olympics, Munich: It is believed 1,000 volunteers were part of the outreach effort, which included 50 Dutch volunteers under Romkje Fountain (who later founded YWAM Holland)
- 1976 Summer Olympics, Montreal: The outreach included street evangelism.
- The 1980 Summer Olympics in Moscow were heavily boycotted and afforded little opportunity for evangelism because of Communist precepts. YWAM is presumed not to have participated.
- 1984 Summer Olympics, Los Angeles: YWAM notes they performed street theater during these games.
- 1992 Summer Olympics, Barcelona: YWAM conducted open-air church services and performed gospel drama, live music and dance in the streets.
- 1996 Summer Olympics, Atlanta: 4,500 YWAM members were active behind the scenes. About 1,000 volunteers were official greeters at the Olympic Village and 1,000 more helped with Olympic security and translating.
- 1998 Winter Olympics, Nagano: Southern Baptist International Mission Board missionaries cooperated with YWAM at the Nagano Winter Olympic Games Outreach. According to the YWAM website, the central event was a prayer march from Zenkō-ji, an historic Buddhist temple, to the Olympic Plaza.
- 2000 Summer Olympics, Sydney: YWAM member Kara Miller Stewart participated in an Olympic dance events. YWAM worked closely with United Bible Societies to distribute Towards the Goal, a sports focused New Testament.
- 2002 Winter Olympics, Salt Lake City: YWAM was hosted by the Salvation Army.
- 2004 Summer Olympics, Athens: YWAM member musician Benny Prasad was invited to perform during these games. YWAM also organized arts and music events. A YWAM member was arrested for "suspicious activity" but was later released. Greece is the only European Union (EU) country to ban proselytism in its constitution.
- 2006 Winter Olympics, Turin: This was reportedly the 16th YWAM Olympic related event. YWAM used entertainment events such as music, street drama, community festivals and snow boarding clinics for creative interaction.
- 2012 Summer Olympics, London: A season of outreach was held during and after the Summer Olympic Games in London, 2012.
- 2016 Summer Olympics, Rio de Janeiro, Brazil: An outreach is planned for this event.

=== Training ===
The purpose of YWAM training programs is stated to be to help develop students' relationship with God and others, to help them find God's purpose for their lives, and to empower them to live Christ-like lives whatever their vocation may be. An important concept in YWAM teaching is the notion of societal "spheres of influence", via the Seven Mountain Mandate such as education, government, arts and entertainment, media and communication, business and commerce, family, and church. YWAM aims to train and equip Christians to become influential within these spheres. One of the university's leaders is Andy Byrd, who would later become one of the co-founders of The Send movement.

The various training schools of YWAM are organized under the structure of the unaccredited University of the Nations. The University of Nations offers modular courses, which in the USA are accredited via bi-lateral arrangements with certain other higher education institutions, rather than by accrediting agencies. In some nations, such as Australia, certain YWAM courses are recognized by accrediting agencies. Most schools in the University of Nations system have a three-month lecture phase which is then followed by a two- to three-month field assignment priced at around $9,000. It has been reported by former members that after the initial Discipleship Training School, they are recruited into further courses, programs, seminars or into long term staffing positions. All staff positions are unpaid and require $400–$600 a month in self-funded fees for room and board. Notably, the price of tuition is comparable to that of most accredited universities who are able to pay staff and faculty.

=== Mercy Ministries ===
YWAM works to help meet the practical and physical needs of the global community through its many relief and development initiatives, collectively known as Mercy Ministries International. These various YWAM ministries are spread throughout most of the locations that YWAM missionaries live and work, and range in scope from serving the poor through local feeding programs to international disaster relief teams that work in places of great need, such as the 2004 tsunami and the 2010 Haiti earthquake.

==== Ship-based ministries ====
YWAM ship-equipped ministries, the maritime arm of YWAM's Mercy Ministries, uses ships to bring physical and spiritual healing to those in need. YWAM ships have provided vital surgeries, dental care, medical supplies, food, seeds, construction materials, development projects, training, and the organisation's spiritual message.

Mercy Ships was the original ship-based relief ministry of YWAM, and the new ship-equipped ministries grew from the foundations laid by the Mercy Ships vision and expansive ministry. Mercy Ships is now operationally separated from YWAM. New Zealand based YWAM ship ministry, formerly a part of Mercy Ships called Marine Reach, which owned and operated the m/v Pacific Link continued to remain within YWAM family and is now operated by YWAM Ships Australia.

==== Disaster relief ====
Various YWAM ministries took part in relief efforts in Louisiana and surrounding states after Hurricane Katrina and Rita.

Youth With A Mission was also involved in disaster relief and grief counseling after the 2004 tsunami. tsunami relief by YWAM staff took place in India, Thailand, and Indonesia in both the immediate aftermath of the tsunami and is reported to still continue in some areas.

Flooding in Pakistan in 2007 in the Sindh province prompted a response by twenty Muslim, Christian, and Hindu volunteers led by YWAM Pakistan. They were assisted by an appeal made through YWAM London's disaster relief|relief office. Various YWAM entities in Pakistan were able to distribute food for a month to 3,000 of the 150,000 homeless survivors there.

Hurricane Katrina flooded all eleven of YWAM New Orleans' buildings. Personnel were evacuated to YWAM bases in Baton Rouge and Tyler, Texas, where volunteers in their MercyWorks relief arm prepared to take food, baby items and water to victims once access was granted to relief workers by the National Guard. Earlier that year, YWAM lodgings in Phuket, Thailand were destroyed by the tsunami of 26 December 2004.

==== Disease prevention and treatment ====
In Uganda, YWAM is working with villagers to provide relief for HIV/AIDS. They have established orphanages and are ensuring children are educated. British singer, Lemar visited the project in Soroti in 2007.

In 2007, ARMS announced a new ministry focus – an international campaign against malaria called Buzz Off. The campaign is aimed at empowering smaller NGOs and ministries working in malaria endemic nations to tackle the problem of malaria at the local level. In from 2009 to 2010 Buzz Off fed resources into Burmese internally displaced people (IDP) camps providing long-lasting insecticidal mosquito nets into IDP areas through already established health networks. Some funding organizations in Australia are getting behind the work that Buzz Off is doing with the IDPs.

==== Other mercy ministry initiatives ====
YWAM San Diego is involved in building homes for families in Mexico through its Homes of Hope ministry. According to Sean Lambert, president of YWAM San Diego/Baja, teams participating with his base have built 2,084 homes for needy families since 1991. Teams purchase the housing materials and, optionally, furniture. These teams then travel to Tijuana or Ensenada, Mexico to build the house with YWAM staff overseeing the project. In recent years the work has expanded throughout the Caribbean into the Dominican Republic, Haiti, Jamaica, and Panama. According to their website, Homes of Hope has built a total of 4,300 homes in 16 different nations.

=== Youth ministries ===
Despite its historical and value emphasis on young people, YWAM involves people of all ages. However, there is still a core emphasis on youth ministry. While YWAM has many programs focusing on youth ministry, within the larger organization it has developed three transnational ministries for youth: Mission Adventures (MA), King's Kids International (KKI) and Youth Street. YWAM holds an annual spring event offering free dentistry to children in Lindale, TX. The ministry is first come, first served; while thousands are given free treatment, thousands more are turned away, sometimes coming from many states away. In 1973, Pastor David E. Ross founded YWAM Korea, and launched campus ministries where Bible meditation sessions, prayer meetings and worship services are held on campuses in that nation. Currently, in South Korea, about 120 universities have YWAM campus ministries with 150 assistant administrators and eight university discipleship training schools.

=== Film projects ===
YWAM Missionary Lee Isaac Chung's film Munyurangabo (Liberation Day) earned Un Certain Regard at the 2007 Cannes Film Festival. Chung cast two street kids whom he found through YWAM's soccer-outreach program as the stars of a film that dealt with the moral and emotional repercussions of the Rwandan genocide.

== Associations and working relationships ==
Youth With A Mission is a global mission with international partnerships. Former chairman Lynn Green recently reported that YWAM representatives sometimes sit "on boards of other commissions" and organizations.

YWAM also works closely with various missions and churches, as well as independent missionaries across the globe. Through these connections, YWAM has sometimes grown by taking over local independent ministries. One example of this is the story of its affiliate in Korea, Jesus Evangelism Team, which joined YWAM in the early 1980s.

A notable working relationship is the OneStory Project which is a partnership between YWAM, Campus Crusade for Christ, the International Mission Board of the Southern Baptist Convention, Trans World Radio, and Wycliffe Bible Translators as well as other Great Commission-focused organizations, churches and individuals. United Bible Societies has also worked closely with YWAM as a missions partner. YWAM joined with the Evangelical Alliance and John C. Maxwell to design the training program for the Global Pastors Network's Million Leaders Mandate. YWAM and Christian Direction work together to pray for Muslims during Ramadan. YWAM Pittsburgh has been involved in ecumenical local efforts to revive Epiphany School through teaching young people "Christian principles" and exposing them to dance and the arts.

=== Partnerships ===
YWAM partners with:

- Christian Aid
- Campus Crusade for Christ
- Trans World Radio
- Wycliffe Bible Translators
- World Vision
- Food for the Hungry
- International House of Prayer
- New Apostolic Reformation
- Modern Day Missions
- The Send

=== Memberships ===
YWAM is a member of:

- the International Orality Network
- Call2All, a 200-organization initiative of the Global Pastors Network to lead a billion souls to Christ
- OneStory Project

=== Endorsements ===
- Church of God Assistant Director Douglas Leroy has noted the cooperation between COG and YWAM, among others, and endorses cooperation with mission groups "who have expertise in certain areas, without compromising our doctrinal or policy integrity."

== Controversies ==
The organization has faced numerous controversies over its doctrine and the behavior of its members, including complaints from former members of spiritual abuse, financial abuse, manipulation, and cultic indoctrination.

=== 2016 sexual assault in Cambodia on outreach ===
A missionary, Mr. Choi, was sent out by YWAM to Cambodia where he was then arrested for engaging in inappropriate relations with a young woman. The young woman stated that she was assaulted. On November 29, Mr. Choi was suspended and banned from his mission and fundraising activities in Korea. Prior to this incident, Mr. Choi had been operating a school called, "New Vision School," which teaches primarily young children, kindergarten to the elementary age range. Mr. Choi had an extensive 30 years of experience in ministry.

=== 2017 Hawaii embezzlement charges ===
In January 2018, Pablo Rivera, the chief financial officer for University of the Nations at YWAM-Kona, pled guilty to wire fraud. Rivera embezzled nearly 3.1 million dollars, amounting to $50,000 per month. According to the YWAM school leadership, in order to compensate for the fraud, increased charges were applied to volunteers and students. According to the Department of Justice press release, Rivera used fraudulent invoices from an outside contractor to supplement his lavish lifestyle; this included plastic surgery, failed stock market investments and a gold mine in Sierra Leone.

=== 2019 Jarryd Hayne controversy ===
Jarryd Hayne was charged with two counts of aggravated sexual assault inflicting bodily harm in relation to the alleged rape of a woman in Australia. The court trial took place starting in September 2020. While on bail, until he was convicted, the former NRL Player of the Year and Dally M medal recipient was scheduled to attend a Discipleship Training School (DTS) at the YWAM Australia Perth location under the Discipleship Training Director, Caleb Brownhill. It is uncertain whether he attended the outreach phase of the school, which was contingent upon a second bail variation.

=== Homes of Hope ===
The YWAM program Homes of Hope was founded in 1990 to provide housing in developing regions. According to statements made to CNN, Homes of Hope works with families to improve housing conditions, constructing homes on property owned by client families. "Their homes are piecemeal, built out of scrap parts — some missing a roof and lacking electricity. These families want better homes, but simply can’t afford them. One nonprofit organization is trying to help." People magazine reported that the program has built over 5,320 homes in 21 countries with the help of more than 105,000 volunteers.

=== Treatment of YWAM volunteers ===
There have been numerous accounts detailing mistreatment of students and staff by leadership during their time in YWAM. The website of the International Cultic Studies Association hosts an article which describes in some detail an experience of spiritual abuse on a DTS course in Hawaii. In this incident the author and two other women left "in fear of serious damage to their mental health". A girl accused YWAM of enabling spiritual abuse, which happens at every single base and another female individual was told to always follow her leaders, even if she was aware that they were wrong.

The Apologetics Index also lists a number of personal accounts of spiritual abuse within the organization. The website's founder claims he himself was a victim of such abuse at the hands of a former YWAM leader, Floyd McClung. Talking about McClung, the author writes: "While I have forgiven the spiritual abuse and accepted his reluctant apologies ... the abuse has had far-reaching consequences, the scars of which I still bear." He also quotes Harold Busséll, author of By Hook or by Crook: How Cults Lure Christians, "While living in Europe, my wife and I were involved with an evangelical youth mission based in Switzerland. We were with the group only six weeks, but it was almost seven years before I had overcome the psychological damage caused by their cult-like control and spiritualization … Questioning a leader was considered an act of rebellion against God and His chain of command." The book is based on the authors experience in YWAM.

The Christian Research Institute also say they have received complaints about YWAM. In 1990, cult "consultant" Rick Ross published an evaluation of Youth With A Mission which cited both positive and negative aspects of YWAM. After the 2007 YWAM shootings, Ross told the Fox News Network that he continued to receive occasional "serious complaints" about Youth With A Mission, but he believed it is "not a cult". Some of the political involvements of its founders and members have also been examined by the media.

=== Theological and doctrinal concerns ===
Evangelical theologians Alan Gomes and E. Calvin Beisner argued certain doctrines taught to young missionaries at some YWAM locations from the 1970s until the 1990s to be unorthodox from a Protestant point of view. They referred to this set of doctrines as "Moral Government Theology", which combined doctrines concerning the nature and attributes of God such as open theism, the nature of man such as Pelagianism linked to a moral explanation of the atonement. Adherents of this theology such as Gordon Olson, Harry Conn and Winkie Pratney taught classes based on this teaching to young missionaries during this time period.

=== Forcing contact with uncontacted peoples ===
In 1995, two missionaries, working with the Brazilian branch of YWAM, JOCUM (Jovens com uma Missão) searched unsuccessfully for uncontacted Hi Merimã Indians. They were caught and expelled by FUNAI. Forcing contact could prove fatal to uncontacted peoples who are very vulnerable to common disease to which they have little resistance. The missionaries' diaries were obtained by Survival International who campaign for Indigenous people's rights.

=== Faked film ===
David Loren Cunningham, son of the group's founders, produced a film, Hakani: A Survivor's Story, which contains a depiction of infanticide among Amazonian tribes of Brazil. Survival International, which campaigns for Indigenous people's rights, said that the film was faked and incited violence against Indigenous people. Members of the Suruwaha people said that evangelical missionaries Márcia and Edson Suzuki told the tribe they were taking a little girl, Hakani, to get medical treatment, but never brought her back. The couple had in fact adopted the girl and falsely claimed that members of the tribe tried to kill Hakani by burying her alive because she was disabled. They then used this lie to raise money and gather support for legislation that would allow Indigenous children to be taken away from their parents by force.

== The Send ==
"The Send" is a global event series organized by YWAM and other ministries to promote Christian evangelism and missions, as reported by The Christian Post with YWAM leader, Andy Byrd serving as its director. On February 23, 2019, over 40,000 Christians gathered at a "The Send" event Camping World Stadium in Orlando, Florida, with thousands more joining via livestream, as reported by Fox News. On February 8, 2020, "The Send Brazil" attracted 140,000 attendees across three stadiums in Brasilia and São Paulo, with millions joining online, according to the Christian Post. Brazilian President Jair Bolsonaro attended.

== Political affiliations ==
Youth With A Mission has no official political affiliations. The YWAM.org website states: "Individual YWAM staff and students come from a wide variety of political backgrounds and affiliations."

=== Accusations of political activity ===
In 1989, Sara Diamond's book Spiritual Warfare mentioned a meeting in the United States between various Christian leaders (including YWAM Founder Loren Cunningham) and Efraín Ríos Montt. Ríos Montt consequently led a coup and counterinsurgency against Marxist guerrillas and his brief tenure as chief executive was one of the bloodiest periods in the long-running Guatemalan Civil War leading to accusations of war crimes and genocide perpetrated by the Guatemalan Army under his leadership. The practice of using missionary groups as cover is not unheard of and prompted the National Association of Evangelicals to release a statement regarding governmental use of missionary and aid workers: "We insist that the CIA close any loophole that allows for intelligence gathering collaboration with clergy, missionaries, and aid workers. We insist that the CIA clarify and publish its policy for the protection of United States citizens serving in ministry abroad." Diamond also suggested that YWAM "sought to gain influence within the Republican party."

In 2009, it was reported that C Street Center was purchased by YWAM in 1980. The property is used by influential and controversial group The Fellowship for hosting meetings, and as boarding facilities for members of the US Congress.

=== Doctrines on redeeming culture ===
In 1975, YWAM's founder Loren Cunningham, along with Bill Bright of Campus Crusade spoke of the importance of influencing seven main segments or spheres of society and culture (Family, Celebration, Religion, Government, Education, Science, Media). One of these segments included "fighting a spiritual battle to redeem the area of government". While the group maintains that its teachings aimed only to promote moral service for Christian citizens, others interpreted the segment as an effort to influence secular governance with evangelical Christian ideals.

Matt Slick of Christian Apologetics and Research Ministry concludes, "The Seven Mountain Mandate is a hyper-focus on Christian dominion theology that does not seem to have the centrality of Christ’s atoning sacrifice as a central theme. In all of my research in it so far, making disciples of unbelievers is not the central issue. Instead, it’s taking dominion."

The Seven Mountain Mandate prophecy was purportedly received as direct revelation from God, and delivered separately to Loren Cunningham, Bill Bright, and Francis Schaeffer ordering them to invade and rule "seven mountains" (sometimes referred to as spheres) of society. It is an ideologically refined version of the Dominion or Kingdom Now theology which Loren Cunningham openly taught and subscribed to, and is considered an unbiblical teaching by mainstream Protestantism. Despite being devised in 1975, it was not until 2000 during a meeting between Cunningham and Lance Wallnau that plans were set in place to fulfill the mandate. The movement came to further prominence after the 2013 publication of Wallnau's and controversial Bethel Church Pastor Bill Johnson's Invading Babylon: The 7 Mountain Mandate. The mandate is also a foundation of the New Apostolic Reformation, a controversial new religious movement which seeks to establish a fifth branch within Christendom.

A scholarly journal article in the Evangelical Review of Theology and Politics shows that the "Seven Spheres" are nearly identical to the ideological state apparatuses developed by the French Marxist philosopher Louis Althusser, on the basis of the theories of Karl Marx, Antonio Gramsci, and others. They both outline the key objects of societal influence to be religion, family, education, media, government, business (trade unions), and arts and entertainment, with Althusser's work being published several years prior to the supposed revelation received by Cunningham, Bright and Schaeffer.

== Violence against YWAM workers ==
=== Murder of Tiffany Johnson and Philip Crouse ===
On December 9, 2007, Matthew Murray, an expelled student from Youth With A Mission (YWAM), shot four staff members at the missionary training center near Denver, killing two. Tiffany Johnson and Philip Crouse were killed, while Dan Griebenow and Charlie Blanch were wounded, all of whom were staff members at YWAM's Denver center. Additionally, two New Life Church members were later killed and three were wounded before Murray was killed.

Per CNN, Murray was dismissed from the program in 2002 due to concerns about his mental health and strange behavior, including talking to voices only he could hear. In the years following his expulsion, Murray expressed resentment towards YWAM, sending hate mail to the mission, according to the Rocky Mountain News. On the day of the shooting, he attacked both the YWAM training center in Arvada and the New Life Church in Colorado Springs, where he was ultimately killed by a security officer. News reports following the shooting noted Murray's obsession with guns.

=== Dan Bauman Imprisonment in Iran ===
Dan Baumann, a missionary with Youth With A Mission (YWAM), was accused of espionage and imprisoned in Iran for nine weeks. While attempting to leave the country after a two-week visit, he and his friend were detained, beaten, and placed in isolation. Baumann endured severe interrogations and two death sentences, but described having had spiritual encounters which strengthened his resolve. After his release, Baumann continued his missionary work, traveling extensively to share his experiences as well as publishing a book about his experience.

=== Jeff Woodke Kidnapping in Niger ===
In October 2016, Jeff Woodke, a missionary with Youth With A Mission (YWAM), was kidnapped from his home in Niger by al-Qaeda-linked terrorists. During his captivity, which lasted over six years, Woodke was subjected to severe mistreatment and transferred between various terrorist groups. Despite the harsh conditions, including being chained to a tree in isolation, Woodke expressed that focusing on forgiveness served as his coping mechanism. He was released in March 2023, a result of collaborative international efforts, including those by the Biden administration, without any ransom or concessions. Post-release, Woodke and his wife, Els, are working on recovery, as he adjusts to life after such a prolonged and traumatic ordeal.

=== Murder of Mike and Janice Shelling ===
Mike Shelling started a Youth with a Mission base in Baguio during 1972. 12 years later, a robbery occurred at their house in a short-term property in Baguio where Ross Tooley, who was also affiliated with the organisation, had visited them a month prior. The couple were fatally stabbed but their children, although missing for some hours, survived unharmed.

== Notes and references ==
=== Sources ===
Gomes, Alan W. (1986). Lead Us Not Into Deception (PDF) (self published). La Mirada, CA: Alan Gomes.
