= Laurenti Mohochi Educational Foundation =

Kusoma International - Laurenti Mohochi Educational Foundation is a nonprofit organization created to enable access to quality education for children of impoverished and marginalized communities (particularly in the former Kuria District of Kenya). It is named after the father of Sangai Mohochi, faculty member with the Stanford University Swahili Department.

== Vision ==
The vision of Kusoma International - Laurenti Mohochi Educational Foundation is that all underserved children - regardless of gender - will, through education, have a positive impact on their community and the world.

== Mission ==
The mission of Kusoma International - Laurenti Mohochi Educational Foundation is to empower impoverished and marginalized communities (particularly in the district of Kuria, Kenya) by enabling their children, regardless of gender, access to quality education, in order to develop their full capabilities and equip them well to fight poverty, ignorance and disease in their communities and the world.

== Goals ==
The goals of Kusoma International - Laurenti Mohochi Educational foundation include the following:

1. To raise funds to implement the mission of the foundation.
2. To build model schools that provide affordable and quality education that gives children in marginalized communities (e.g. Kuria) a fighting chance in the stiff competition for space in Kenya’s institutions of higher education.
3. To offer scholarships that would enable bright young boys and girls from poor families to acquire an education, hence giving them an opportunity to partake of a basic human right, and uplift themselves as well as their families from abject poverty.
4. To offer the youth in poor communities (e.g. Kuria District) an opportunity to participate in community service through an outreach program that also offers guidance, career, and health education in light of the HIV/AIDS prevalence in the region.
