= Samson Mwita Marwa =

Kenyan teacher and politician (1932–2022)

Samson Mwita Marwa MP

Member of Parliament for Kuria
- In office 1969–1974
- Preceded by: Benjamin Chacha Maisori-Itumbo
- Succeeded by: Benjamin Chacha Maisori-Itumbo

Personal details
- Born: 1932 Bukuria, Kenya
- Died: 2022 (aged 89–90)
- Party: Kenya African National Union
- Children: At least 8
- Education: Kisii Teacher Training College

Samson Mwita Marwa (1932–2022), also known as Mwita Nyagakende, was a Kenyan teacher and politician who served in the National Assembly of Kenya from 1969 until 1974 as a member of the Kenya African National Union.

== Biography ==
Samson Mwita Marwa was born in 1932 in the Bukuria District, then part of the British Kenya Colony. He was educated at the intermediate school in Itibo, and later attended the teachers' college in Kisii. Marwa worked as a teacher from 1957 until 1963.

Marwa's political career began in 1961, when he co-founded the Bukuria Political Union, serving as its inaugural chairman. In 1963, Marwa was elected to the Nyanza Regional Assembly, representing the Kuria District as a member of the Kenya African National Union. While in the regional assembly, Marwa served as a member of the Regional Commerce and Industry Committee and the Local Government and Administrative Committee. He also served as director of the Kuria Transport and Traders Union. In 1965, the Nyanza Regional Assembly appointed him to the South Nyanza Liquor Licensing Court.

Marwa was elected to the National Assembly of Kenya following the 1969 Kenyan general election. Marwa defeated incumbent Benjamin Chacha Maisori-Itumbo in the Kuria constituency, receiving 3,073 votes, while Maisori-Itumbo received 1,930 votes. However, Maisori-Itumbo defeated Marwa in a rematch in the 1974 Kenyan general election, receiving 3,814 votes compared to Marwa's 2,361. During his tenure in parliament, Marwa campaigned for the opening of an agricultural training center in Kuria, but was rebuffed by Maina Wanjigi, the assistant minister of agriculture, who considered Kuria to be too remote. After leaving parliament, Marwa remained locally involved, stating in 2001 that the deforestation rate in Meru County was exceeding the reforestation rate.

Marwa was a polygamist, and had at least eight children, including prominent journalist Chaacha Mwita. Marwa died in 2022 at the age of 89 or 90.
