= Dennis G. Peters =

American chemist (1937–2020)

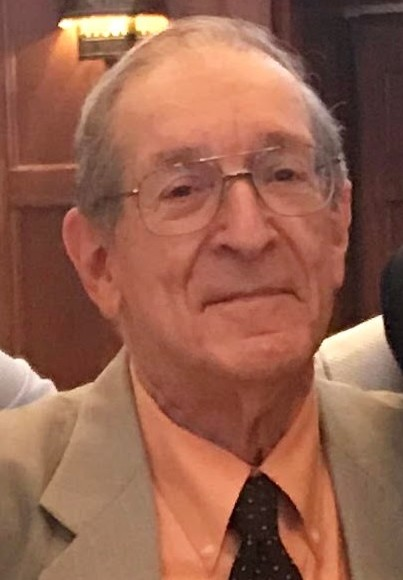
- Peters in April 2018
- Born: April 17, 1937; Los Angeles, California, US
- Died: April 13, 2020 (aged 82); Bloomington, Indiana, US
- Education: California Institute of Technology (B.S.); Harvard University (Ph.D.)
- Awards: 2020 Roland F. Hirsch Award
- Scientific career
- Fields: analytical chemistry; electrochemistry
- Institutions: Indiana University
- Thesis: Chronopotentiometric studies with platinum and gold electrodes (1962)
- Doctoral advisor: James J. Lingane
- Website: http://www.indiana.edu/~echem/index.php

Dennis Gail Peters (April 17, 1937 – April 13, 2020) was an American analytical chemist who specialized in electrochemistry and was named the Herman T. Briscoe Professor at Indiana University in 1975. Peters led his own research group at Indiana University in Bloomington, Indiana until his death in 2020. Peters' research focused on the electrochemical behavior of halogenated organic compounds, more recently moving to focus on transition metal catalysts in regards to the oxidation and reduction of organic species. He authored or co-authored over 210 publications and 5 analytical chemistry textbooks.

== Early life and education ==
Dennis Peters was born on April 17, 1937, in Los Angeles, California. He completed his Bachelor of Science in chemistry from the California Institute of Technology in 1958 and graduated cum laude before completing his PhD in analytical chemistry at Harvard University under James J. Lingane. After completing his PhD in 1962, Peters went to Indiana University in Bloomington, Indiana.

== Career ==
Peters served as the chemistry department's graduate student advisor from 1969 to 1971 where he recruited the department's largest incoming class. His research has focused on the mechanistic and synthetic properties of the oxidation and reduction of halogenated organic compounds and electrocatalysis in organic synthesis. Peters was still actively teaching up to the time he suffered a fall during spring break 2020 and was taken to a hospital.

== Death ==
Peters died from hospital-acquired COVID-19 on April 13, 2020, four days before his 83rd birthday. He contracted the virus while in a Bloomington hospital recovering from a fall.

Peters' name was included in the May 2020 New York Times tribute U.S. Deaths Near 100,000, An Incalculable Loss to the 100,000 Americans who lost their lives as a direct result of the pandemic. A reporter for the Indiana Daily Student wrote that "Peters had a roaring voice that filled lecture halls".

== Awards and honors ==
- 1990, American Chemical Society Division of Analytical Chemistry J. Calvin Giddings Award for Excellence in Teaching
- 2002, Electrochemical Society Henry B. Linford Award for Distinguished Teaching
- 2006, W. George Pinnell Award for Outstanding Service, Indiana University Bloomington
- 2007, Elected Fellow of the Electrochemical Society
- 2012, Electrochemical Society Division of Organic and Biological Electrochemistry, Manuel M. Baizer Award
- 2012, Elected Fellow of the American Association for the Advancement of Science
- 2017, Elected Fellow of the American Chemical Society
- 2020, American Chemical Society Division of Analytical Chemistry, Roland F. Hirsch Award for Distinguished Service

== Publications ==
=== Books ===
- Fischer, Robert B.; Peters, Dennis G. (1968). Quantitative Chemical Analysis, Third Edition (3rd ed.). W.B. Saunders. ISBN 978-0721636962.
- Fischer, Robert B.; Peters, Dennis G. (1968). A Brief Introduction to Quantitative Chemical Analysis. W.B. Saunders. ISBN 978-0721637006.
- Fischer, Robert B.; Peters, Dennis G. (1971). "Chemical equilibrium (Fischer, Robert B.; Peters, Dennis G.)". Journal of Chemical Education. 48 (7). W.B. Saunders: A461. doi:10.1021/ed048pA461.1. ISBN 9780721637051.
- Peters, Dennis G.; Hayes, John M.; Hieftje, Gary M. (1974). Chemical Separations and Measurements. W.B. Saunders. ISBN 978-0721672038.
- Peters, Dennis G. (1976). A Brief Introduction to Modern Chemical Analysis. W.B. Saunders. ISBN 978-0721672021.
