= Wilfred Machage =

Kenyan politician (1956–2022)

Member of the Kenyan Senate
- In office 28 March 2013 – 2017
- Constituency: Migori County

Member of the Kenyan Parliament
- In office 2003–2013
- Constituency: Kuria

Personal details
- Born: 10 August 1956 Kenya
- Died: 19 February 2022 (aged 65) Abuja, Nigeria
- Party: Jubilee
- Relations: Sospeter Machage Twin Brother
- Education: University of Nairobi
- Profession: Medical Doctor
- Cabinet: East African Community

Wilfred Gisuka Machage (10 August 1956 – 19 February 2022) was a Kenyan politician.

== Biography ==
Machage was first elected as Member of Parliament to represent the Kuria Constituency in 2002. He served in several government ministries as an assistant minister and was at one time appointed a cabinet minister for East African Community Affairs, Bank accounts held at Kenya Commercial Bank, where he was also an ex-officio member of the East African Legislative Assembly. In 2007, he was the Democratic Party candidate and was elected to represent the Kuria Constituency in the December 2007 Kenya parliamentary election. He served as Assistant Minister of Home Affairs' Office of Vice President, Office of the President, Health, and Roads. Machage was elected as the first senator of Migori county serving from 2012 to 2017. He was a businessman with interests in different sectors globally. He was appointed Ambassador by H.E. Uhuru Kenyatta on 27 January 2018. Machage was the Kenyan high commissioner to Nigeria and accredited to 12 other countries in central and west Africa. He died in Abuja on 19 February 2022, at the age of 65.
