= Nyabasi =

- Location within Kenya
- Coordinates: 1.3°S 34.58°E
- Country: Kenya
- Province: Nyanza Province
- Time zone: UTC+3 (EAT)

Nyabasi is a settlement in Kenya's Nyanza Province.
