= Sospeter Machage =

Kenyan diplomat

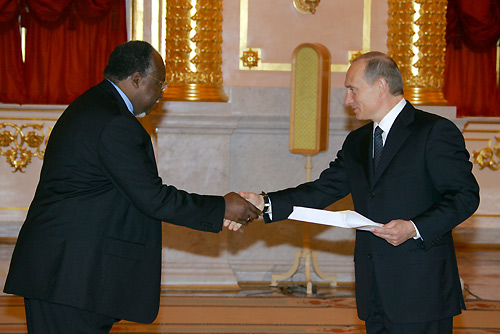
Sospeter Machage presents his credentials to Russian president Vladimir Putin on 8 November 2005.

Sospeter Magita Machage is a Kenyan diplomat who served as the ambassador of Kenya to Russia. He is also concurrently accredited to Ukraine, Republic of Belarus and Republic of Kazakhstan until 2010. He was appointed ambassador on 20 April 2005.

Machage served as public servant in different capacities for over 26 years. He served as the registrar, Kenyatta National Hospital from 1983 to 1984 and as medical officer of health Kitui District from 1984 to 1986. He was the provincial medical officer for health Easter Province from 1986 to 1987.

While in the private sector he served as the chief of staff and deputy director, Kendu Mission Hospital from 1987 to 1989. He was the medical officer in-charge Isibania Maternity and Nursing Home from 1989 to 1996. He served as a member of DDC, Medical Board Kuria District and Medical Board Transmara District. He also served as the medical officer in-charge St. Joseph's Mission Hospital (Kilgoris) from 1996 to 1999. He was medical advisor Catholic diocese of Ngong and medical director Transmara Medicare hospital.

Prior to his appointment he served as director, Ministry of Water and Natural Resources Management and Development and also chairman Development, and Environment Committee of Lake Victoria Service Board.

He graduated with doctorate degree in medicine – physician (MD) and general surgery from Kharkov State University and Crimea State Medical Institute (USSR) in 1983. In 2005, he joined the Peoples' Friendship University of Russia, where he was awarded a First Class Honors master's degree in international relations in 2009. He is currently pursuing PhD degree in international relations at the same university.

In 2007 he became professor and academician of the Academy of Problems of Security, Defence and Order (Russia).
