= David L. Cunningham =

American film director

- Born: February 24, 1971 (age 55); United States
- Occupations: Film director, documentarian

David L. Cunningham (born February 24, 1971) is an American documentarian and filmmaker. Besides his documentary credits in more than 40 countries, Cunningham has also directed several feature films including To End All Wars (2001) and the TV miniseries The Path to 9/11 (2006). Cunningham is represented by the United Talent Agency.

== Background and early work ==
As a child, Cunningham traveled around the world visiting orphanages, refugee camps, and many other isolated locations with his parents in their work with NGOs with the specific purpose of introducing people to Jesus. His parents, Loren and Darlene Cunningham, ordained ministers in the Pentecostal Assemblies of God denomination, are the founders of Youth With A Mission (YWAM) and the University of the Nations, an international, interdenominational Christian organization with campuses in over 100 countries with a special emphasis on education for the developing nations. These childhood experiences would greatly influence Cunningham's world view as a filmmaker.

Cunningham studied film and graduated from both the University of Southern California and University of the Nations (Hawaii, Amsterdam, and Santiago, Chile campuses).

Cunningham traveled with his father and took the first American crew to the remote Pitcairn Islands to shoot his documentary Pitcairn: Mutineers in Paradise. His earlier films took him to Egypt, Australia, and Hollywood, California. After filming parts of documentaries in over 40 countries, Cunningham made his feature film debut with Beyond Paradise. The film was a critical and commercial hit in the Pacific Region playing for three months in theatres in Hawaii.

In March 2000, Youth With A Mission students donated $14,000 in seed money toward his $14 million independent film To End All Wars (p 176) Shot in Hawaii, Thailand, and Scotland, the film tells the true story of WWII allied prisoners in a POW camp in Thailand who secretly form a “jungle university” in the camp morgue. Starring Kiefer Sutherland and Robert Carlyle, it performed notably well at film festivals including Telluride Film Festival, Toronto International Film Festival, Heartland Film Festival, Hawaii International Film Festival, and Mill Valley Film Festival). The film was later picked up for distribution by Goldcrest and 20th Century Fox.

Since that time, Cunningham has made a number of movies, including the telefilm The Path to 9/11. He shot the film After... under Moscow's Red Square in the secret tunnels built by Joseph Stalin.

Cunningham is directing and producing The Wind & the Reckoning, a fictionalized account of the Koolau Rebellion in Hawaii.

Cunningham is a member of the Travelers' Century Club, whose members can document visits to over 100 countries, and of the Directors Guild of America.

== The Path to 9/11 ==
Cunningham directed the ABC miniseries The Path to 9/11, which dramatized terrorist activities and U.S. government responses from the 1993 World Trade Center bombing through the events of 9/11. The film was controversial for its misrepresentation of events and people as well as last minute editing before the broadcast. Despite ABC spending $40 million on the project, The Path to 9/11 was beat in the ratings by an NFL game. The Path to 9/11 was nominated for 7 Emmys.

The Path to 9/11 was criticized by the Clintons for its inaccuracy in the handling of terrorist Osama bin Laden. The docu-drama was praised by conservative writer Davis Hanson as being "a well-crafted dramatic interpretation", and condemned by critics for scenes which portrayed events they claim never occurred, and supported a story line which could lead viewers to incorrect conclusions.

Official promotions of the film made varying claims about its factual basis: Fox TV on Sept 6, 2006, quoted the producers as saying the show was based "solely and completely on the 9/11 Commission report." However, On ABC's Path to 9/11 blog, Cunningham emphasized: "This is a movie or more specifically a docudrama. Meaning, it is a narrative movie based on facts and dramatized with actors."

Max Blumenthal reported in The Nation that Cunningham's Path to 9/11 had been heavily promoted by right wing activist David Horowitz and the conservative Liberty Film Festival and that ABC CEO David Iger had initiated a last-minute investigation and edit of the film. The New York Times reported that Mr. Platt [the producer of Path to 9/11 and Hope Hartman, a spokeswoman for ABC, said "the political and religious affiliations of the two men (Cunningham and Nowrasteh, the writer) had nothing to do with and did not influence the mini-series in any way." Nowrasteh defended Cunningham in an OpinionJournal.com column, arguing that criticism of the Cunningham's association with his father's Christian mission was akin to McCarthyism, in which "the merest hint of a connection to communism sufficed to inspire dark accusations."

To date, ABC has not released the mini-series to DVD. In 2007, Oliver Stone said while he's "not vouching for its accuracy," he thinks it is "a dangerous precedent, to allow a movie to be buried". A 2008 documentary by John Ziegler and producer David Bossie of Citizens United premiered a documentary co-produced, written and directed by Ziegler entitled Blocking The Path to 9/11. Jeffrey Ressner of Politico, wrote Blocking 'The Path to 9/11 mirrored The Path to 9/11 because it "raises even more questions and adds its own set of disconnected dots to this broadcasting dilemma".

== The Film Institute ==
The Film Institute (TFI), a "non-profit association geared toward educating filmmakers from the developing world, linking like-minded filmmakers, and focusing resources and talent for social change", was established by Cunningham and several University of the Nations alumni in 2004. Though ABC asserted that the network itself was the source of funding for The Path to 9/11, TFI became embroiled in the controversy when several internet bloggers claimed it funded or influenced the movie.

According to TFI member Mark Harris' speech at a Latin American Youth With A Mission conference: "One goal of TFI is to fast-track U of N School of Digital Film interns, placing them within the film industry, so that they can begin to tell the stories that need to be told and help make a difference through film". Harris also stated that he was a volunteer coordinating TFI's interns at the time. He rebutted the assertion that TFI initiated or funded The Path to 9/11.

== Hakani ==
In 2008, Cunningham directed Hakani: A Survivor's Story telling the story of an 8-year-old boy's rescue of his little sister ("Hakani") who, because of birth defects, was to be put to death by their tribe in the Amazon. The film was shot with members from 8 Amazonian tribes. In Brazil, the film has played a part in a controversial indigenous peoples' rights campaign.

In 2008, the Brazilian government officials said "the missionaries are exaggerating and exploiting the issue to justify their attempts to convert Indians to Christianity". In 2009, Survival International released a statement that the film is "faked, that the earth covering the children's faces is actually chocolate cake, and that the film's claim that infanticide among Brazilian Indians is widespread is false." Survival International has pointed out that the Hakani film is being used by Youth with a Mission to facilitate their ministries in the area.

== Filmography ==
- The Pitcairn Story: Mutineers in Paradise (1991)
- Target World (1992)
- Passport to the World (1993)
- Pacific Mercy Ships (1995)
- Walkabout Australia (1996) (V)
- Baja 1000 (1996)
- Beyond Paradise (1998)
- The Dream Center: Hope for the Inner City (1999)
- To End All Wars (2001)
- Little House on the Prairie (2004) (miniseries)
- After... (2006)
- The Path to 9/11 (2006) (TV)
- The Seeker: The Dark Is Rising (2007)
- Hakani: A Survivor's Story (2008)
- Running for Grace (2018)
- The Wind & the Reckoning (2022)
