= Daryl Bonilla =

American actor and comedian

Personal information
- Born: February 16, 1975 (age 51) Honolulu, Hawaii, U.S.

Professional wrestling career
- Ring name(s): Daryl Bonilla; DDB
- Billed height: 5 ft 10 in (178 cm)
- Debut: 2000
- Retired: 2018

Daryl Bonilla (born February 16, 1975, in Honolulu, Hawaii) is an American actor, comedian, and former professional wrestler and founder of the Hawaii-based professional wrestling company Action Zone Wrestling (AZW) (2005-2018), where he also served as booker and an announcer for the company.

== Career ==
=== Comedy ===
Bonilla is currently a stand-up comedian performing regularly in Hawaii. He has headlined several shows in Honolulu. He has also opened for Ron Funches, Felipe Esparza, Geechy Guy, Andy Bumatai, Gary Owen, Demetri Martin and Tom Segura. He released his first comedy album entitled "What Year You Grad?" in the fall of 2017 and it is available on iTunes, and spotify. He won Hawai'i comedian of the year in 2015, 2016 and 2017.

=== Professional wrestling ===
Bonilla was also involved in professional wrestling having entered the world of professional wrestling in 1997 when he joined World League Wrestling—Hawaii (run by former wrestler Lars Anderson) as the TV host of their weekly show. Bonilla also became a manager, using the name DDB or "Dangerous" Daryl Bonilla. He left World League Wrestling in 1999 to join the upstart promotion Super Wrestling Force (SWF). That promotion closed only a few months later and was restarted in January 2000 as Third Wave eXplosion (TWX). That promotion closed in the summer of 2000.

Along with local wrestler Lopaka, Bonilla decided to help upstart promoter Parrish Ho officially launch his promotion NWA Hawaii. So along with "The Rocker" Don Lee and "Hotstuff" Kris Kavanaugh, they "invaded" World League Wrestling in June 2000. It was at this time that Bonilla made his in-ring debut as a wrestler. Bonilla worked as the booker and Lopaka as the head trainer. After a falling out, Bonilla left NWA Hawaii in June 2001. He briefly returned in 2002 as a commentator.

In January 2003, Linda Bade created Hawaii Championship Wrestling (HCW) and asked Bonilla to join. Bonilla teamed with Ultimate Fighter Caruso as his manager and tag team partner. In 2004, HCW bookers decided to break up the duo to put Caruso back with his former partner. Around that time, Bonilla left due to acting commitments as well as a lack of interest in HCW.

In 2005 Bonilla founded Action Zone Wrestling (AZW), which made its debut on June 25, 2005, in Waianae, Hawaii (his hometown) and has attracted talent from mainland US (A.J. Styles, James Gibson, Delirious, Larry Sweeney, Matt Cross, Jimmy Jacobs, Teddy Hart, Christopher Daniels and Super Hentai) and Japan. Bonilla also competed against UFC fighter Jason "Mayhem" Miller at the event titled "Anything Goes" (an event where the fans pick the matches) in October 2005 in a "Mixed Martial Arts Mayhem" match where he lost via submission due to armbar.

AZW has featured several wrestlers from Dragon Gate and has had a working relationship with the organization since 2007 as Dragon Gate wrestlers CIMA, Naruki Doi, Susumu Yokosuka, Dragon Kid, BxB Hulk, Masato Yoshino have competed in AZW. On September 8, 2008, Bonilla participated in Dragon Gate's debut show in Hawaii at the Waikiki Shell teaming with Akua in losing effort against Nebulous & Kaniala, Bobby Bolt & Rocko Shinoda and eventual winners Nijuu Ninkaku & SABAKI. He wrestled for the company until the end of 2008. He won the AZW Tag Team Titles twice (with The Rage and again with Akua). He lost an opportunity at the AZW Heavyweight Title to then champion Kaniala on September 22 of that year.

Bonilla returned to the ring on June 29, 2009, teaming with Kenryu Takadoki to take on the Polynesian Power Trip (Ativalu & Kaimana) for the AZW Tag Team Championship. During the match DDB got into an altercation with Kenjiro Katahira (a former wrestler and part owner of defunct HCW), which led to Takadoki fending for himself and eventually losing.

In March 2012 Bonilla along with AZW stars Kaimana, "Mr. Athletic" Jeff Cobb, Bobby Bolt & Mark Anarchy ventured out to Hayward, California to take on the stars on All Pro Wrestling (APW) in the "Pacific Challenge" best of three series.

Currently, Bonilla works more as an announcer for the weekly AZW show and live events, while only wrestling periodically. On November 17, 2018, Bonilla held the final AZW live event at Waianae, Hawaii (where the very first AZW show was held on June 25, 2005) as he officially retired and closed AZW after an impressive 13-year run.

=== Acting ===
Bonilla began his acting career right out of high school, performing on stage in several local productions.

In 1996 Bonilla was cast as Keao in the indie film Beyond Paradise. Immediately after the film was wrapped, Bonilla started doing local commercials. A 2000 commercial for Bank of Hawaii, in which Bonilla coined the phrase "That's My Bank!", became so popular in Hawaii that the bank brought Bonilla back in 2002. They even created a bobblehead of him as part of a promotion. The campaign ended December 2006. His other film credits include To End All Wars, The Sand Island Drive In Anthem, and All for Melissa. His TV credits include roles in the short lived series The Byrds of Paradise and the short lived remake of Fantasy Island. He has also appeared in commercials (both TV and radio) for Bud Light, Taco Bell, Oceanic Cable, and McDonald's. He appeared in an advert about workplace safety during the COVID-19 pandemic.

He appeared on two episodes Hawaii Five-0 remake airing on CBS in 2010 and 2017 respectively. In 2011 he appeared in the films 4 Wedding Planners and The Short List both of which premiered at the Hawaii International Film Festival. In 2012 he was in the Hawaii independent film Parts of the Same Circle. He appeared in a supporting role in the feature "Growing Up Local" which aired in select theatres starting in August 2023 and is now streaming on Amazon Prime.

== Championships and accomplishments ==
- Action Zone Wrestling
  - AZW Tag Team Championship (2 times) – with The Rage (1) and Akua (1)
