= University of the Nations =

Worldwide Christian university

- Motto: To Know God and to Make Him Known
- Type: Private
- Established: 1978
- President: Markus Steffen
- Provost: Thomas A Bloomer
- Location: Global, 600 campuses in 142 countries
- Affiliations: YWAM
- Website: www.uofn.edu

The University of the Nations (U of N) is an unaccredited Christian university. The University of the Nations operates under the umbrella organization of the Youth With A Mission (YWAM) network.

== History ==
The institution was founded in 1978 as Pacific & Asia Christian University (PACU) by Howard Malmstadt and Loren Cunningham, the founder of Youth with a Mission, in Kailua-Kona, Hawaii. As other locations were established around the world, PACU was renamed the University of the Nations in 1989.

== Accreditation ==
University of the Nations is not accredited by any recognized accreditation body. As such, its degrees and credits may not be acceptable to employers or other institutions, and use of degrees from schools without accreditation from a nationally recognized accrediting agency may be illegal in some states unless the school is approved by the state licensing agency.

University of the Nations asserts that other institutions have accepted and continue to accept transfer credits, including Houghton College, and the South African Theological Seminary.

Australia's higher education and training system lists University of the Nations' affiliated Institute for the Nations and Youth With A Mission programs in five locations as registered training organisations authorized to provide certificates and diplomas in several specified fields.

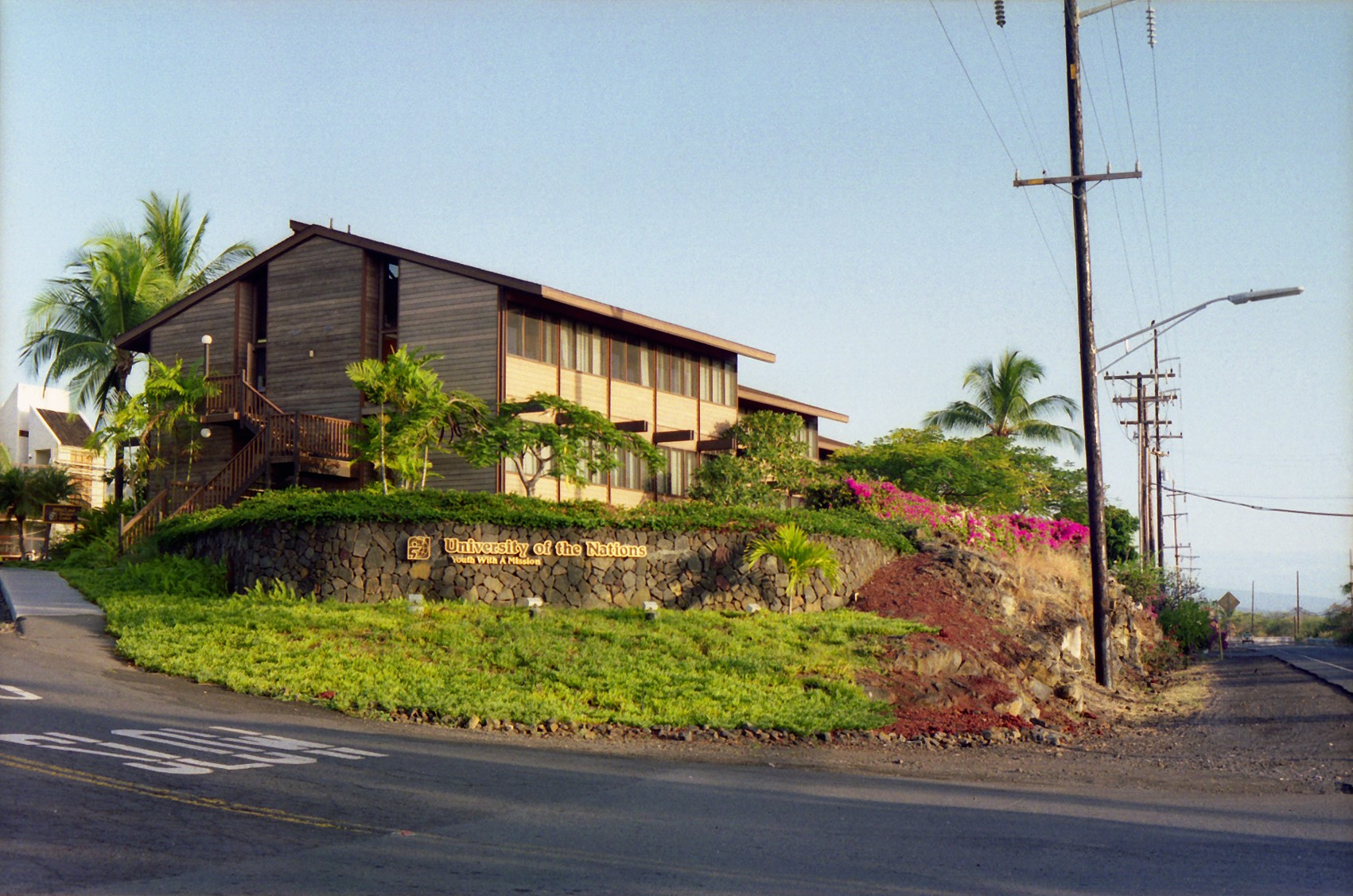
Campus entrance from the roadside

== Notable people ==
=== Alumni ===
- Kenneth Bae, author, missionary, and activist
- Mina Chang, former Deputy Assistant Secretary of the United States Department of State's Bureau of Conflict and Stabilization
- David L. Cunningham, son of university founder and filmmaker

=== Visiting faculty ===
- Forrest Mims, Electronics author and amateur atmospheric scientist
- Darrow Miller co-founder of the Disciple Nations Alliance, author and past vice president of Food For the Hungry International
- David Newberry, senior public health advisor, CARE- Primary Health Care Unit, member of the Centers for Disease Control and Prevention's Global Smallpox Eradication Team – Ghana & Nigeria, faculty at Johns Hopkins University, research associate in the Department of International Health Private Voluntary Organization Child Survival Support Program

== Controversies ==
In January 2018, Pablo Rivera, the chief financial officer for University of the Nations in Kona, pled guilty to wire fraud. Rivera embezzled nearly 3.1 million dollars, amounting to $50,000 per month. Before the fraud was exposed, the school's financial situation had become critical and increased charges were applied to volunteers and students.

In October 2020, University of the Nations in Kona was associated with the largest single day increase of COVID-19 outbreak on the Island of Hawaiʻi up to that date.

== See also ==
- List of unaccredited institutions of higher learning
