= Nuru International =

Non-profit organization in the USA

Nuru is a United States 501(c)3 created to help marginalized communities in rural areas of Kenya, Ethiopia, Nigeria, Burkina Faso, Benin, and Ghana. The ultimate aim of the program is to help local leaders end extreme poverty in their communities. Nuru is a Kiswahili word that means "light."

== History ==
Nuru International (now known as Nuru) was founded by Jake Harriman, who attended the U.S. Naval Academy and served for over seven years in the U.S. Marine Corps as a Platoon Commander. Harriman's experiences in combat compelled him to believe that extreme poverty was a contributing factor to global terrorism. Harriman left his career in the Marine Corps and enrolled at Stanford University's Graduate School of Business. This move was motivated by a desire to start an organization that would fight terrorism by ending extreme poverty. His company, Nuru International, began operations in 2008.

== Development Model ==
Nuru is a global collective that enables inclusive and sustainable prosperity by identifying communities at the stability tipping point, strengthening rural livelihoods and market systems, and fostering stabilizing connections that repair social fabric and pave a pathway to peace. Nuru has impacted over 450,000 people across 7 countries through 411 climate-smart agribusinesses that have equipped their members to increase their incomes and yields for lasting resilience. Nuru partners with third-party evaluators like the Ray Marshall Center at the University of Texas for evaluation of its in initiatives.

The Nuru Model is a locally-led, market-based approach to rural poverty alleviation. Nuru focuses on smallholder farmer and pastoralist entrepreneurs in areas highly vulnerable to food insecurity, instability, and climate change. Nuru customizes and tailors its livelihood and agribusiness strategies to increase food production and economic potential, ensuring lasting impact for generations.

== Awards, Recognition, and Accreditations ==
Better Business Bureau Accredited Charity

4-Star Charity by Charity Navigator

Candid Platinum Seal of Transparency

Zayed Sustainability Prize Finalist (2018, 2023)

Nuru Nigeria: National Award for the Highest MSME Training and Empowerment in Northeast Nigeria, presented by the Nigerian Association of Small and Medium Enterprises (2025)

Anthem Award Winner 2023 - Nuru Kenya Managing Director Pauline Wambeti

West Africa Acumen Fellow (2023) Nuru Nigeria Managing Director Amy Gaman

2022 Classy Award for Social Innovation

Best Nonprofit to Work for (2018, 2019, 2024, 2025)

Great Place To Work (2018, 2019)

Humentum Operational Excellence Awards received by several staff (2015-2019)

Adamawa State Humanitarian Ambassador of the year (2019): Nuru Nigeria Managing Director Amy Gaman

Excellence in Leadership and Humanitarian Services by Nigeria Achievers Awards (2019): Nuru Nigeria Managing Director Amy Gaman

Acumen and IKEA Social Entrepreneurship East Africa Accelerator Program: Nuru Kenya COO Tom Kibet (2020)

Acumen and IKEA Social Entrepreneurship East Africa Accelerator Program, Nuru Ethiopia Cooperative and Agribusiness Manager Biruk Abayneh (2021)

ONE Campaign Nigeria Champion (2020): Nuru Nigeria Managing Director Amy Gaman

East Africa Acumen Fellow (2018): Nuru Kenya Managing Director Pauline Wambeti

Climate Smart Agriculture Project of the Year Shortlist: Nuru Kenya (2018)
