= Howard Malmstadt =

American chemist (1922–2003)

Howard Vincent Malmstadt
- Born: February 17, 1922
- Died: July 7, 2003 (aged 81); Hawaii
- Citizenship: United States
- Education: University of Wisconsin–Madison (BS, MS, PhD)
- Known for: Electronic Instrumentation
- Scientific career
- Fields: chemistry
- Workplaces: University of Illinois at Urbana-Champaign, University of the Nations
- Thesis: High Frequency Titrations (1950)
- Doctoral advisor: Walter J. Blaedel
- Doctoral students: Gary M. Hieftje

Howard Vincent Malmstadt, Ph.D., (February 17, 1922, in Marinette, Wisconsin – July 7, 2003, in Hawaii), Emeritus Professor of Chemistry at the University of Illinois at Urbana-Champaign and co-founder of the University of the Nations, widely considered the father of modern electronic and computerized instrumentation in chemistry.

== Early life ==
Malmstadt was born on 17 February 1922 in Marinette, Wisconsin. He graduated from the University of Wisconsin–Madison in 1943 with a B.S. degree doing undergraduate research in organic chemistry. After graduation, he became an ensign in the US Navy, attending naval electronics and radar schools at Princeton University, MIT, Bell Labs, San Diego Fleet School, and Pearl Harbor. He became supervisor for the Department of Electronics Fundamentals at the Naval Radar School on Treasure Island, California before being released from the US Navy in 1946 with the rank of lieutenant.

In 1948 he received an M.S. degree and a Ph.D. in chemistry in 1950 (both from the University of Wisconsin–Madison). His thesis was titled "High Frequency Titrations."

He joined the University of Illinois as faculty in 1951 becoming a professor in 1962. Malmstadt's major areas of research were in precision null-point potentiometry, emission and absorption spectrochemical methods, automatic titrations, and automation of analytical methods. His book, Electronics for Scientists (co-written with Christie G. Enke), was seminal in introducing thousands of scientists to electronic methods of scientific data collection, leading to the nickname of "High Voltage Malmstadt".

Malmstadt had a patent design for a titration apparatus. This was manufactured from 1954 by Sargent and sold under his name. Malmstadt wrote ten internationally used textbooks and more than 150 scientific articles.

== Ministry ==
In 1978, Malmstadt retired from the faculty at the University of Illinois, to co-found the Pacific and Asia Christian University, which was renamed the University of the Nations in 1989; he served as International Provost and later International Chancellor.

Malmstadt is also known for students that went on to highly successful academic research careers, including Stanley R. Crouch (Michigan State University), M. Bonner Denton (Arizona), Willard W. Harrison (University of Florida), Gary M. Hieftje (Indiana University), Gary Horlick (Alberta), and James D. Winefordner (University of Florida).

In 2000 Malmstadt coauthored "Courageous Leaders Transforming Their World". In 2007, John Feaver wrote a biography of Malmstadt.

== Publications ==
- Howard V. Malmstadt, Christie G. Enke and Stanley R. Crouch, Electronics and Instrumentation for Scientists (Jan 1981), Benjamin-Cummings Pub Co; 1st Ed. ISBN 978-0805369175
- Howard V. Malmstadt, Christie G. Enke, Stanley R. Crouch, Microcomputers and Electronic Instrumentation: Making the Right Connections, Publisher: Amer Chemical Society (April 1994), ISBN 978-0841228610
