= Kuria District =

Former administrative district in Kenya

Coordinates: 0°30′S 34°30′E

Kuria District was an administrative district in the Nyanza Province of Kenya. Its capital town is Kehancha (sometimes spelled as Kihancha). The district has a population of 256,086 (2009 census) and an area of 581/km^{2}. It is inhabited by a minority group of people fondly known as Kuria people, also referred to as Abakuria (Mkuria/Wakuria) in Swahili. They are scattered across the Kenya-Tanzania border and are neighbors to the Kisii, Luo, and Maasai people.

Following the Referendum of 2010 and the promulgation of the Constitution of Kenya, Kuria District became part of Migori County which is under the leadership of Governor Ochilo G. M. Ayacko. and his deputy, Joseph Gimunta Mahiri.

Kuria District was split into two in December 2007, Kuria West District with Kehancha as the district capital and Kuria East District with Kegonga as the district capital.

Kuria West covers three administrative divisions namely Kehancha, Mabera and Masaba Divisions while Kuria East spans the two administrative divisions namely Kegonga and Ntimaru.

There are two constituencies in the former District, Kuria West and Kuria East. At the 2009 Kenya Population and housing census, Kuria West had a population of 162,857. As of 2023 it was headed by Mathias Robi Nyamabe, who was re-elected to parliament for a third time, and Kuria East until 2022 was headed by Kitayama Marwa Kemero Maisori. Kuria East had a population of 93,229 at the 2009 census.

Both Mathias and Kitayama won their seats under the United Democratic Alliance party ticket (UDA). Kuria District is divided into five administrative divisions:

Administrative divisions
Division	Population*	Urban pop.*	Headquarters
Kegonga	57,044	27,098	Kegonga
Kehancha	62,260	29,267	Ikerege
Mabera	44,782	7,213	Suba Kuria
Masaba	38,550	9,342	Masaba
Ntimaru	53,450	18,513	Ntimaru
Total	256,086	91,433	-
*2009 census.

== Organizations ==
- Laurenti Mohochi Educational Foundation
- Nuru International
- Action Aid
- Soteni International

== Notable residents ==
- Samson Mwita Marwa, Member of Parliament
