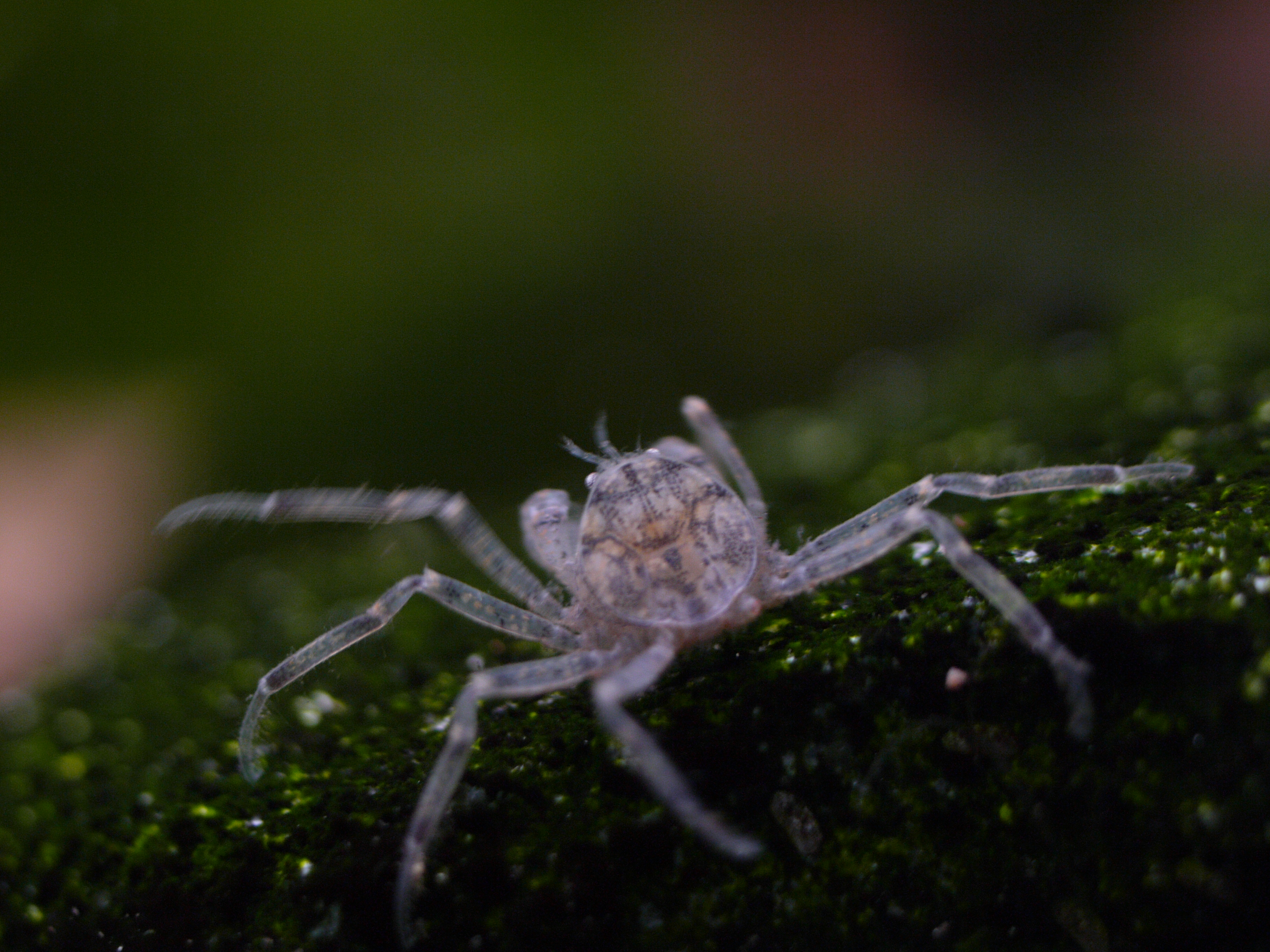

Scientific classification
- Kingdom: Animalia
- Phylum: Arthropoda
- Class: Malacostraca
- Order: Decapoda
- Suborder: Pleocyemata
- Infraorder: Brachyura
- Family: Hymenosomatidae
- Genus: Limnopilos
- Species: L. naiyanetri

Binomial name
- Limnopilos naiyanetri Chuang & Ng, 1991

Synonyms
- Hymenicoides naiyanetri (Ng, 1995)

= Limnopilos naiyanetri =

Species of crab

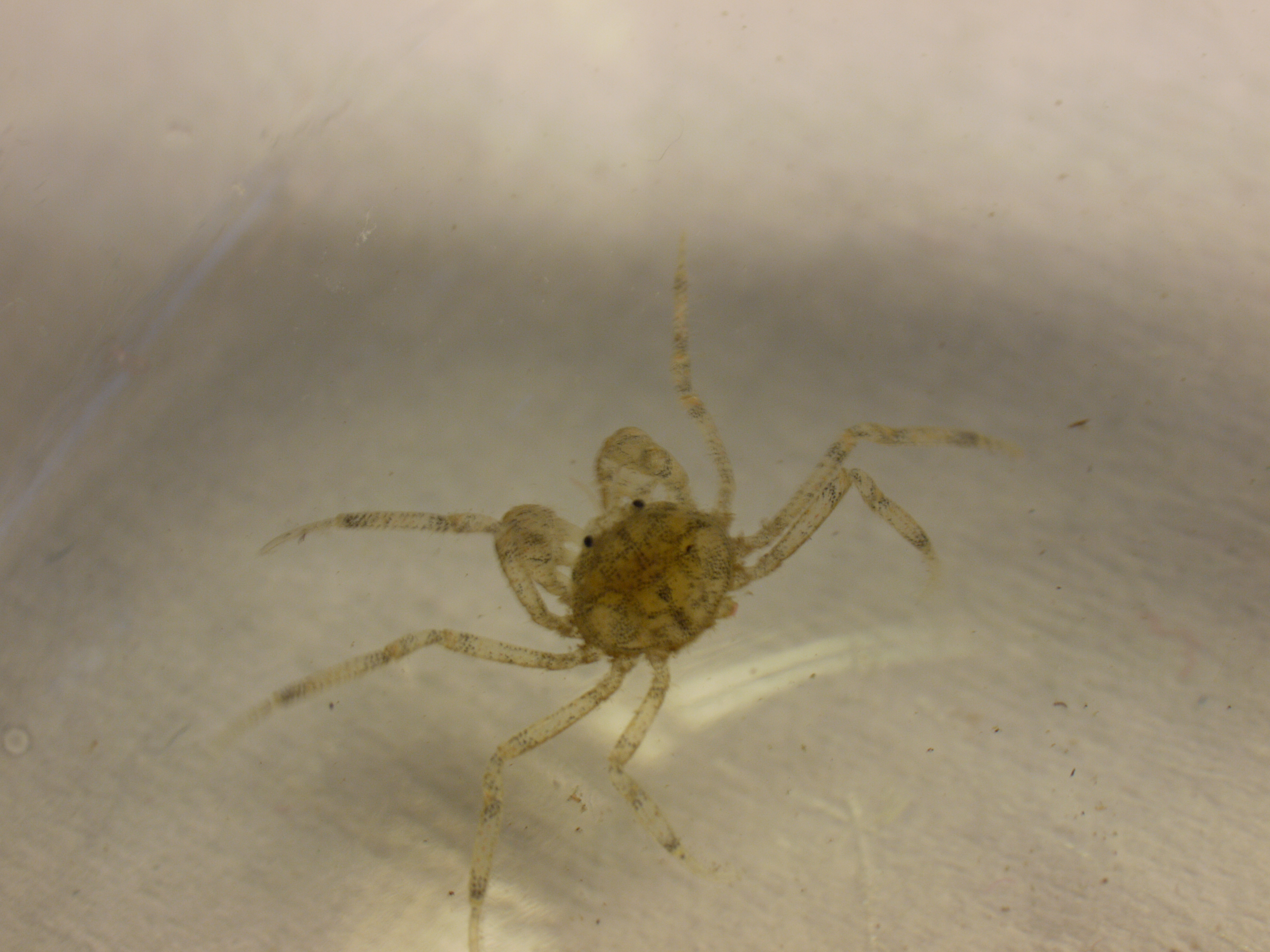
An individual of this species photographed in captivity.

Limnopilos naiyanetri, commonly referred to as the Thai micro crab, is a freshwater hymenosomatid crab endemic to Thailand. Its presence has only been confirmed in the Tha Chin River. The species was described in 1991 and represents the type species of Limnopilos. The Thai micro crab was first introduced to the aquarium hobby in 2008 when it was imported to Germany by the tropical fish importer Aquarium Glaser GmbH, and has slowly grown in popularity with aquarium hobbyists. It remains a relatively rare species on the market and detailed information on the husbandry of this species is scarce.

== Description ==
This species is quite small, the carapace reaching only 1 cm in width at maturity. The leg span may reach lengths of 2.5 cm. Individuals of this species are semi-translucent and range from grey to light brown. It has a circular, flat carapace with contiguous gastro-cardiac grooves and margin. A defining feature of this species is a setose or pilose carapace and chelipeds. These soft hairs collect detritus, which may provide food or serve as camouflage for the animal. Like other hymenosomatids, Limnopilos naiyanetri has a weak or absent rostrum. There are many characteristics which distinguish it from other hymenosomatid crabs, however: its telson is not distinctly trilobate, the eyes are not concealed from dorsal view by the anterior carapace, and male first pleopods have a simple structure. In both male and female individuals, all abdominal segments are free and unfused.

Many aspects of this species' ecology and natural history are still poorly understood, and there have been no documented instances of reproduction in captivity. The crabs release free-moving larvae which are assumed to develop in freshwater, but this is unconfirmed.

== Distribution and habitat ==
Limnopilos naiyanetri is endemic to Thailand. The first identified individuals were collected from a section of the Tha Chin River in the Nakhom Pathom province, where they were found on the roots of water hyacinths. The species is elusive and its presence has not been confirmed outside of this river basin. They are nocturnally active and forage for detritus on aquatic plants and mosses, although they may act as opportunistic carnivores.

In aquariums, this species should be kept between pH 6.5 and 7.3 with temperatures between 21°C (70°F) and 27°C (82 °F). These crabs are sensitive to water conditions and nutrient levels in the water should be closely monitored.

== Taxonomic history ==
Limnopilos naiyanetri was described in 1991 by Christina Chuang and Peter Ng, but shortly thereafter in 1995 Ng reclassified the species under the genus Hymenicoides, a closely related group of hymenosomatids. In 1996, Ng and Chuang commented that the characteristics which made them decide the crab represented a new genus than Hymenicoides originally were the lack of a protuberance on the outer surface of the male cheliped and structural differences of the telson, but after reconsideration these seemed to be interspecific rather than intergeneric differences. However, Danièle Guinot and Bertrand Richer de Forges studied specimens in 1997 and commented that the crabs may in fact represent a genus separate from Hymenicoides. The genus Limnopilos and the species Limnopilos naiyanetri were confirmed in 2007, along with two new species of Limnopilos, by Tohru Naruse and Peter Ng.
