= Hymenosoma lurio =

Scientific classification
- Kingdom: Animalia
- Phylum: Arthropoda
- Clade: Pancrustacea
- Class: Malacostraca
- Order: Decapoda
- Suborder: Pleocyemata
- Infraorder: Brachyura
- Family: Hymenosomatidae
- Genus: Hymenosoma
- Species: H. lurio

Binomial name
- Hymenosoma lurio Poore, Jaime & Teske, 2025

Species of crab

Hymenosoma lurio, the Lúrio crown crab, is a species of crab in the family Hymenosomatidae. It has so far only been reported from the estuary of the Lúrio River in northern Mozambique, after which it is named.

This species is morphologically most similar to H. crosnieri Naruse & Guinot, 2023 from Madagascar. Genetic data further indicate a close relationship with H. projectum Dawson & Griffiths, 2012, a species found in estuaries of north-eastern South Africa.
