= Osmose (Cambodia) =

Cambodian conservation organization

Osmose is a conservation organization in Cambodia.

They are active against the invasive water hyacinth and support conservation of waterfowl.
