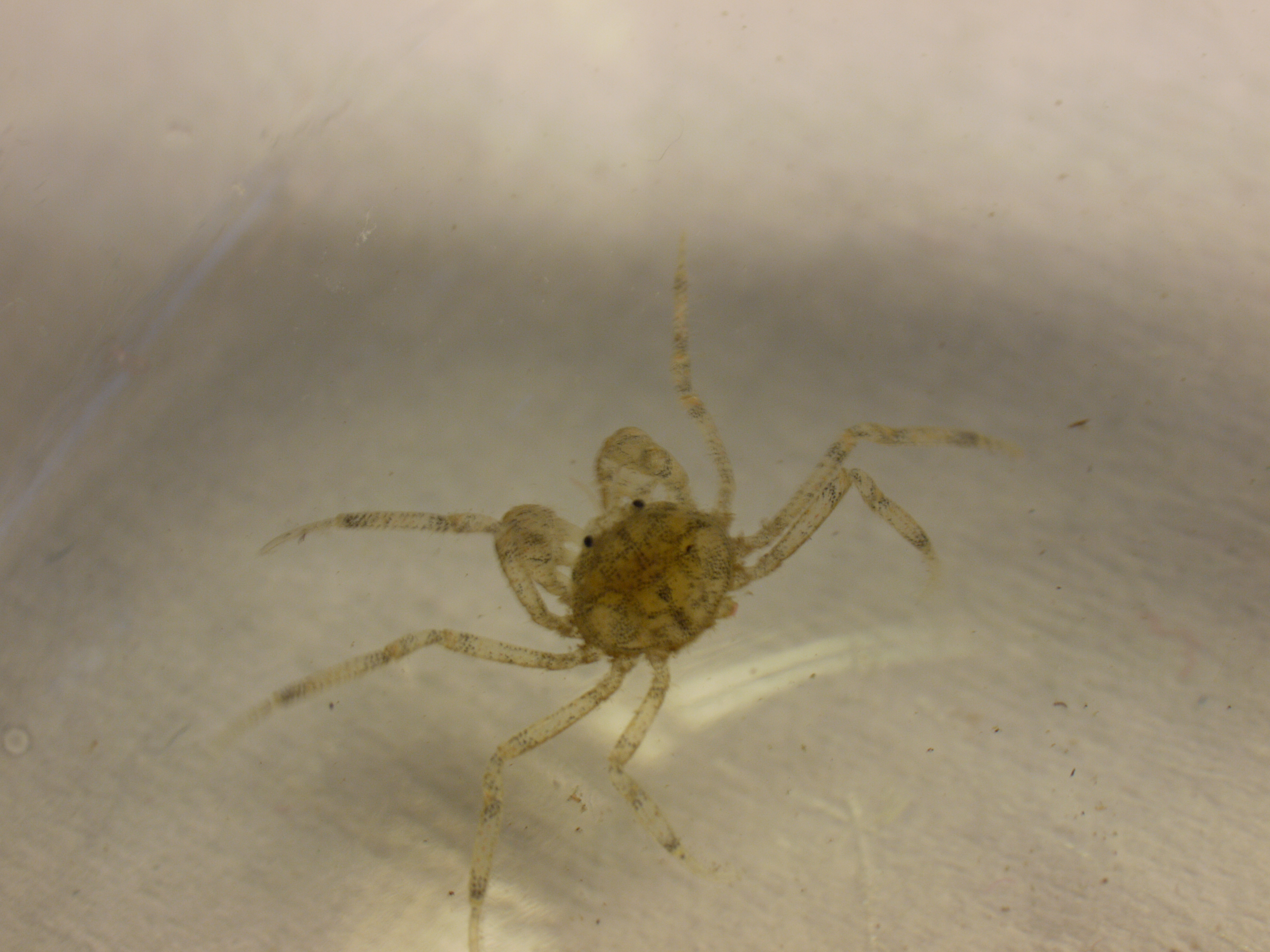
- Limnopilos naiyanetri, the type species of Limnopilos

Scientific classification
- Domain: Eukaryota
- Kingdom: Animalia
- Phylum: Arthropoda
- Class: Malacostraca
- Order: Decapoda
- Suborder: Pleocyemata
- Infraorder: Brachyura
- Family: Hymenosomatidae
- Subfamily: Hymenosomatinae
- Genus: Limnopilos; Chuang & Ng, 1991

Type species
- Limnopilos naiyanetri

= Limnopilos =

Genus of Southeast Asian crabs

Limnopilos is a genus of small hymenosomatid crabs endemic to Southeast Asia. The genus was described by Christina Chuang and Peter Ng in 1991, who identified the new species Limnopilos naiyanetri and distinguished it from the closely related genus Hymenicoides. Its true taxonomic classification was debated for several years, but in 2007 the discovery of a new species of crab in this genus solidified the distinction between Limnopilos and Hymenicoides. Many aspects of the genus Limnopilos are still poorly understood. Their ecology and natural history have not been studied in detail, and their reproductive cycle remains mysterious.

L. naiyanetri is the type species of this genus. The genus name Limnopilos refers to the fact that animals of this genus inhabit freshwater and are hairy.

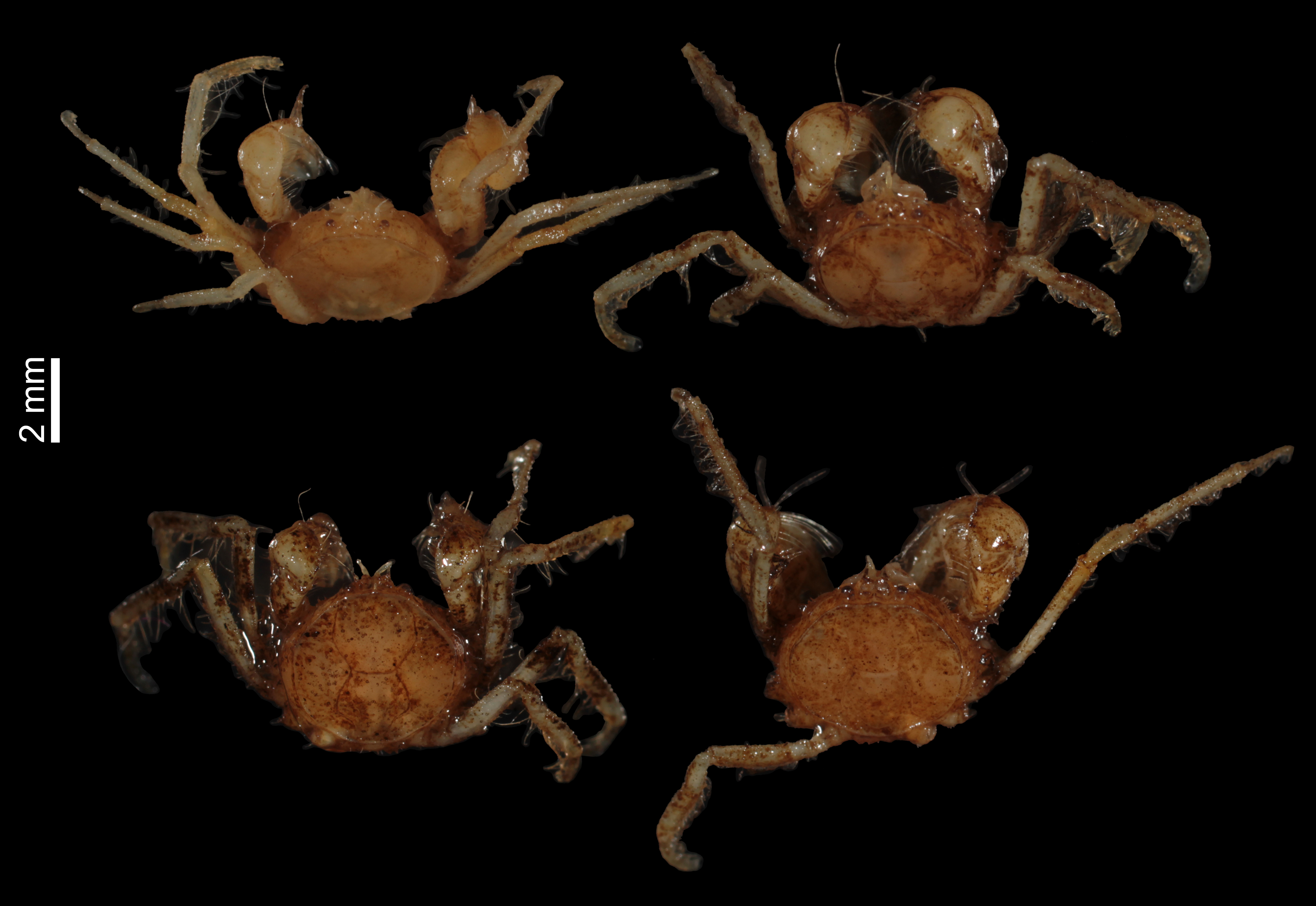
A dorsal view of Limnopilos sumatranus.

== Description ==
Species of this genus are quite small, the carapace reaching only 1 cm in width at maturity. The leg span may reach lengths of 2.5 cm. The carapace is circular and pilose and the dorsal surface is concave. There are distinct gastro-cardiac grooves and margin. The male chelae are stout, partially covered by dense setae, and lacking a tubercle. The rostrum is absent or weak. The eyes, antennae, and antennules are visible from above. Both male and female abdomen-pleotelson are six-segmented. The male pleotelson is slightly trilobed. Female abdomen-pleotelson segments are distinctly demarcated. In L. sumatranus, there is a boundary between the first and second segments, or between the second and third segments in L. naiyanetri. Long, biramous pleopods are found on the second to fifth segments, developed from distal outer end of the inner surface of each segment. Crabs of the genus Limnopilos can be distinguished from other hymenosomatid crabs by the following features: their telson is not distinctly trilobate, the eyes are not concealed from dorsal view by the anterior carapace, and male first pleopods have a simple structure. In both male and female individuals, all abdominal segments are free and unfused.

== Distribution and habitat ==
The three described species of Limnopilos are endemic to Southeast Asia. Limnopilos naiyanetri is found in Thailand. The first identified individuals were collected from a section of the Tha Chin River in the Nakhon Pathom province, where they were found on the roots of water hyacinths. The species is elusive and its presence has not been confirmed outside of this river basin. L. sumatranus was discovered in the Batang Hari River in Sumatra. L. microrhyncus is endemic to Malaysia and is found in the Kinabatangan River.

== Taxonomic history ==
The genus Limnopilos was described in 1991 following the discovery of Limnopilos naiyanetri in Thailand. This genus and species were described by Christina Chuang and Peter Ng, but shortly thereafter in 1995 Ng reclassified the species as Hymenicoides naiyanetri. In this same publication, Ng described a new, closely related species collected from the Kinabatangan River in Malaysia: Hymenicoides microrhyncus. In 1996, Ng and Chuang commented that the characteristics which made them decide the crab represented a new genus than Hymenicoides originally were the lack of a protuberance on the outer surface of the male cheliped and structural differences of the telson, but after reconsideration these seemed to be interspecific rather than intergeneric differences. However, Danièle Guinot and Bertrand Richer de Forges studied specimens in 1997 and commented that the crabs may in fact represent a genus separate from Hymenicoides. The genus Limnopilos and the species Limnopilos naiyanetri were confirmed in 2007, along with two new species of Limnopilos, by Tohru Naruse and Peter Ng. Specimens collected in the Batang Hari River in Sumatra were described by Naruse and Ng as L. sumatranus, and Hymenicoides microrhyncus and H. naiyanetri were reclassified to the genus Limnopilos.

== Species ==
There are three species:

- Limnopilos microrhyncus (Ng, 1995)
- Limnopilos miromekong Ng & Chhuoy, 2023
- Limnopilos naiyanetri Chuang & Ng, 1991
- Limnopilos sumatranus Naruse & Ng, 2007
