= Neochetina eichhorniae =

Scientific classification
- Kingdom: Animalia
- Phylum: Arthropoda
- Class: Insecta
- Order: Coleoptera
- Suborder: Polyphaga
- Infraorder: Cucujiformia
- Family: Brachyceridae
- Genus: Neochetina
- Species: N. eichorniae

Binomial name
- Neochetina eichorniae Warner, 1970

Species of beetle

The mottled water hyacinth weevil, Neochetina eichhorniae, is a beetle that has been introduced as a biological pest control herbivore agent to waterways and lakes in countries worldwide to control the spread of the invasive noxious weed species Eichhornia crassipes, the water hyacinth, an aquatic plant native to the Amazon basin.

== Description ==
Neochetina eichhorniae is native to Argentina and neighboring areas of South America. It is primarily a brownish-gray with characteristic brown mottling. It measures approximately 3.5 mm in length, excluding the head and antennae.

The weevil's life cycle is approximately three to four months, depending on environmental factors.

== Biological plant pest control ==
Neochetina eichhorniae was first introduced, as an herbivore agent for the biological control of water hyacinths, to Florida in the United States in 1972. Due to its successful reduction and control of the plant in the Everglades and other natural water systems there, it has subsequently been introduced in more U.S. states and other countries, such as in east African Lake Victoria as a powerful biological control agent.

Water hyacinth is a highly invasive species and has a tendency to cover and choke major waterways and lake surfaces, which can have numerous detrimental ecological, biological diversity, fisheries, hydroelectric, transportation, and economic results.

The adults produce characteristic feeding scars on the leaves and petioles. In the larval stage, the insect tunnels into the petioles and the crown of the plant. This feeding results in biotic stress, reduced flowers and seeds, and less vigorous growth.
