= Water hyacinth in Lake Victoria =

Invasive plant species in Africa

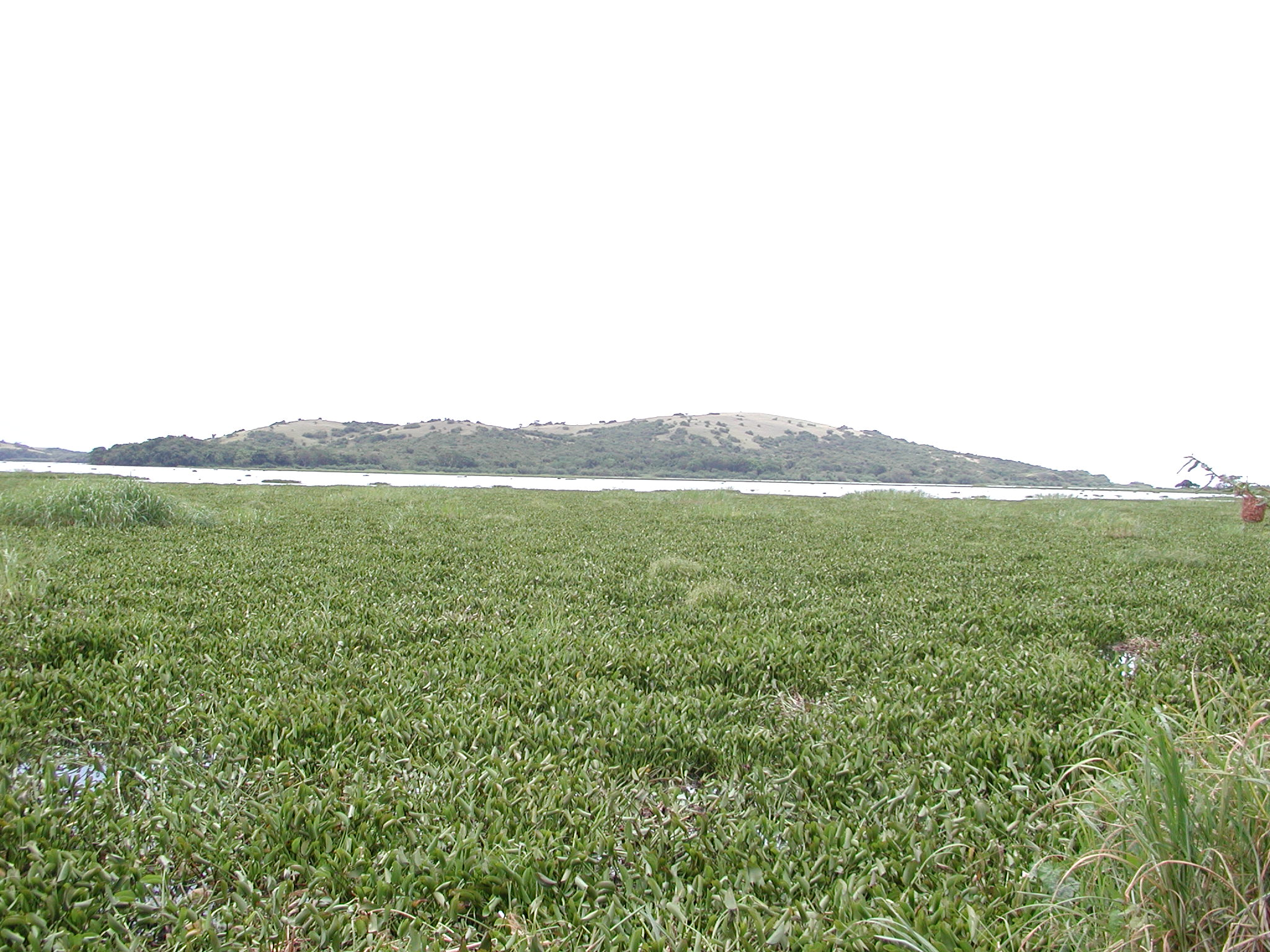
Hyacinth-choked lakeshore in 2001 at Ndere Island, Lake Victoria, Kenya

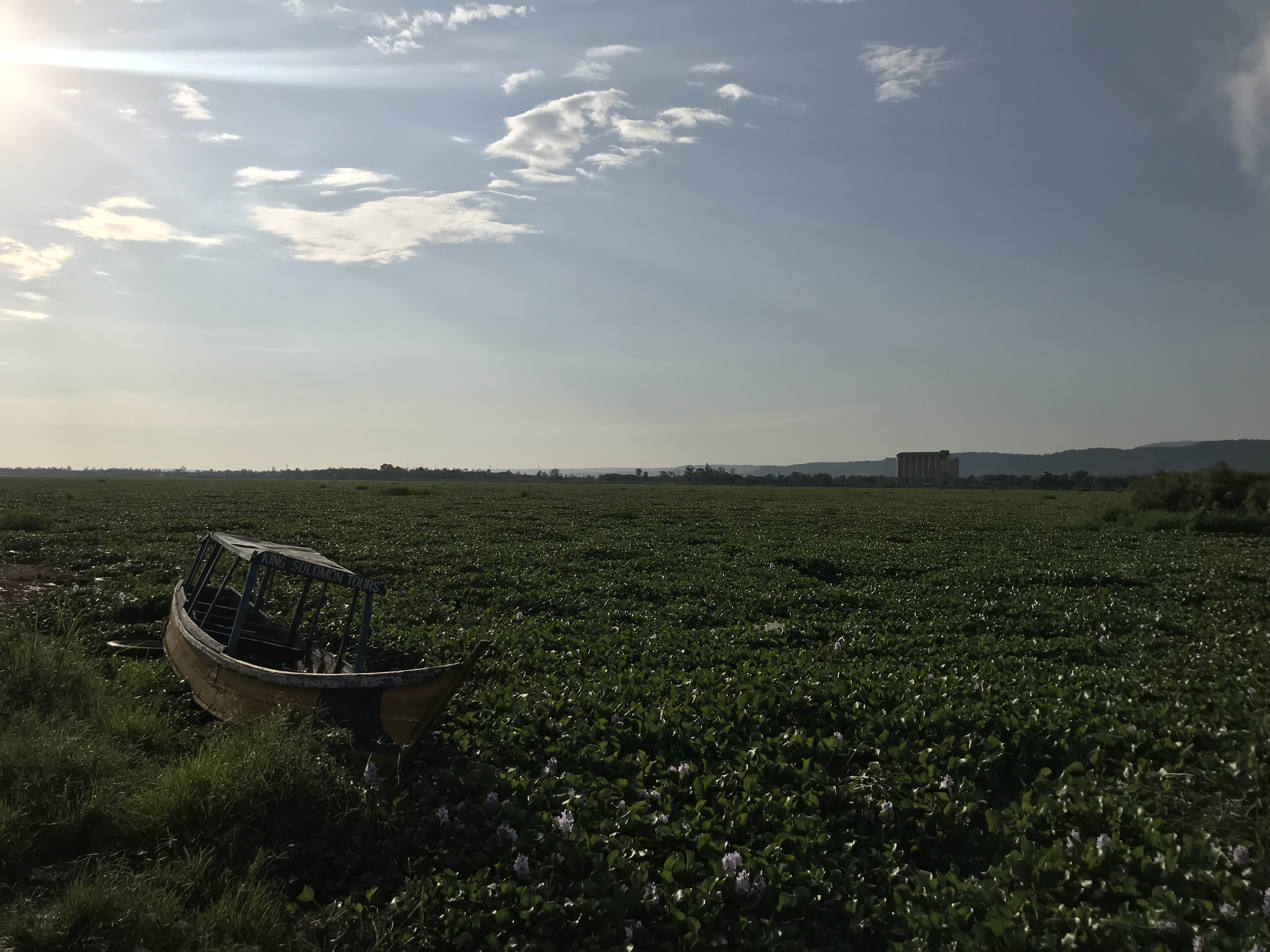
Boat trapped by hyacinth (2017)

Water hyacinth is a major invasive plant species in Lake Victoria. While native to the continent of South America, human activity introduced the plant to Lake Victoria around the 1980s. It negatively affects the local ecosystem and people. The presence of water hyacinth in Lake Victoria is associated with lower amounts of dissolved oxygen in water and increased water acidity. It is also correlated to a higher risk of malaria, schistosomiasis, and cholera. Economically, the weed has damaged the fishing industry through reducing catchability of fish, and of boat transportation. Biological control agents have been used to control the growth of water hyacinth, and satellite monitoring is used to track its spread.

== History ==
The exact time and place of introduction of water hyacinth into Africa has been a topic of debate. As its flowers are reputed for their beauty, it may have been brought over as an ornamental for garden ponds by Belgian colonists in Rwanda and Burundi. Water hyacinth is currently theorised to have physically entered Lake Victoria from Rwanda via the Kagera River, most likely in the 1980s. The hyacinth has since spread prolifically, due to a lack of natural predators, an abundance of space, and agreeable temperature conditions. Abundant nutrients are also present in the lake, exacerbated by increasing levels of heavy metal pollution.

The population of water hyacinths increased rapidly between 1992 and 1998. Their population was greatly reduced by 2001, but has since resurged to a lesser degree. Management techniques include insect controls and manual beach cleanup efforts. Water hyacinth infestations are rarely exterminated in full; instead, they must be continually managed to prevent excessive regrowth.

== Development ==
Water hyacinth negatively affects the people living around Lake Victoria. Its proliferation has halted fishing by reducing catchability. While this has impeded overfishing, it has also resulted in economic losses. The presence of water hyacinth has increased disease presence, as it creates breeding areas for mosquitoes and other insects. This has led to a higher risk of skin rash, cough, malaria, encephalitis, gastro-intestinal disorders, and bilharzia/schistosomiasis. Water hyacinth also interferes with water treatment, irrigation, and water supply. It can smother aquatic life by deoxygenating the water, and it reduces nutrients for young fish in sheltered bays. It has blocked supply intakes for the hydroelectric plant, interrupting electrical power for entire cities. The weed also interrupts local subsistence fishing, blocking access to the beaches.

There are also indications that water hyacinths can provide benefits to the Lake Victoria Region. Water hyacinths have been planted in an attempt to purify eutrophicated water. Once established, the plants can be harvested and used for biogas production, fertilizer, and other things. In 2018, two biogas digesters were installed in the village of Dunga in Kenya, with many more slated to be installed in Kenya. Water hyacinth can also be tested for other uses, like sea cucumber that is being used to make some medicine from its chitin and chitosan.

== Impacts ==
=== Ecology ===
The ecological balance of Lake Victoria is disrupted majorly by the spread water hyacinth, as it degrades water quality through physical and chemical means. Its dense growth forms mats across the lake surface, which stops sunlight from penetrating the water, as well as the mixing of water by wind. Low sunlight availability reduces phytoplankton productivity, which, combined with reduced water mixing causes a decrease in dissolved oxygen. The presence of water hyacinth increases water temperature, which is significant as warmer water also holds less dissolved oxygen, and increases the solubility of toxic compounds that may be present in the lake such as zinc. It also increases acidity of water, which can further dissolve toxic compounds as well as altering water chemistry. These conditions cause suffering to organisms in the lake, particularly hypoxia and food shortage to planktivorous fish. Water hyacinth presence also affects aquatic insects. Changes in food web dynamics alter higher trophic levels leading to cascades in biodiversity loss. Water hyacinth may also smother spawning areas, such as those used by the native tilapia.

=== Human health ===
The accumulation of water under the weed mats is a breeding hotspot for Anopheles mosquitoes, which are the main carriers of malaria in the Lake Victoria area. Water hyacinth is correlated with an increase in snail abundance, which is a host to Schistosoma mansoni. The free swimming fluke causes human schistosome infection, known as schistosomiasis. Water hyacinth is also associated with a high presence of cholera. Experiments show that cholera was found in higher concentrations on hyacinths than surrounding water, which may increase the survivability and transmissibility of the pathogen. Bathing in and drinking water from Lake Victoria can lead to cholera infection. Additionally, the mats make it difficult to access water points, which may encourage locals to use polluted accessible water. Thus, the risk of diseases such as cholera, is increased.

=== Socio-economic effects ===
The fishing industry, which is a source of income for millions of people, has gone through a drastic decrease in its economic benefits. The weed literally mats together and wrecks fishing nets as well as boat engines. As a result, there has been a great decrease in 'catchability' fish at the old beaches such as those in the Winam Gulf. Besides that, the weed blocks ferry navigation and local transportation routes thus making trade more difficult and high-priced for the local communities.

== Management and control ==
=== Biological and integrated control ===
The major strategy for sustainable management in the Lake Victoria basin has been the use of biological control agents. It started in the late 1990s, when Neochetina weevils were introduced to the leaves of the plant. As a result, there was a great "boom and bust" of the weed population, however, studies indicate that natural climatic events such as El Niño and nutrient enrichment (eutrophication) of the lake from the adjacent land are the main factors that determine the speed of the weed's comeback. Integrated pest management approaches now recommend that these biological agents be used together with mechanical harvesting and better land-use practices to control the nutrients that are responsible for the growth. It is estimated that management of the weed in Lake Victoria has an annual cost of $100 million.

=== Satellite monitoring and utilization ===
Given the enormous size of the lake, the scientists have no alternative but to employ highly sophisticated instruments in order to trace the weed's dissemination. The use of the Sentinel-1 polarimetric radar data has made it possible for them to pinpoint the weed location with a 98% accuracy level since 2024. The managers also got the whole picture without a doubt as the cloud cover was extremely thick. "State of the Basin" regional policy is mainly covering the monitoring issue as one of its components in order to protect 45 million people who live in the area. The latest "usage" strategies are turning the weed into biogas, organic fertilizer, and hand-made paper products. Such a "strategy from a scourge to a market" increases the local people's readiness to join in the lake cleaning activities and at the same time, their daily needs are locally and sustainably met.
