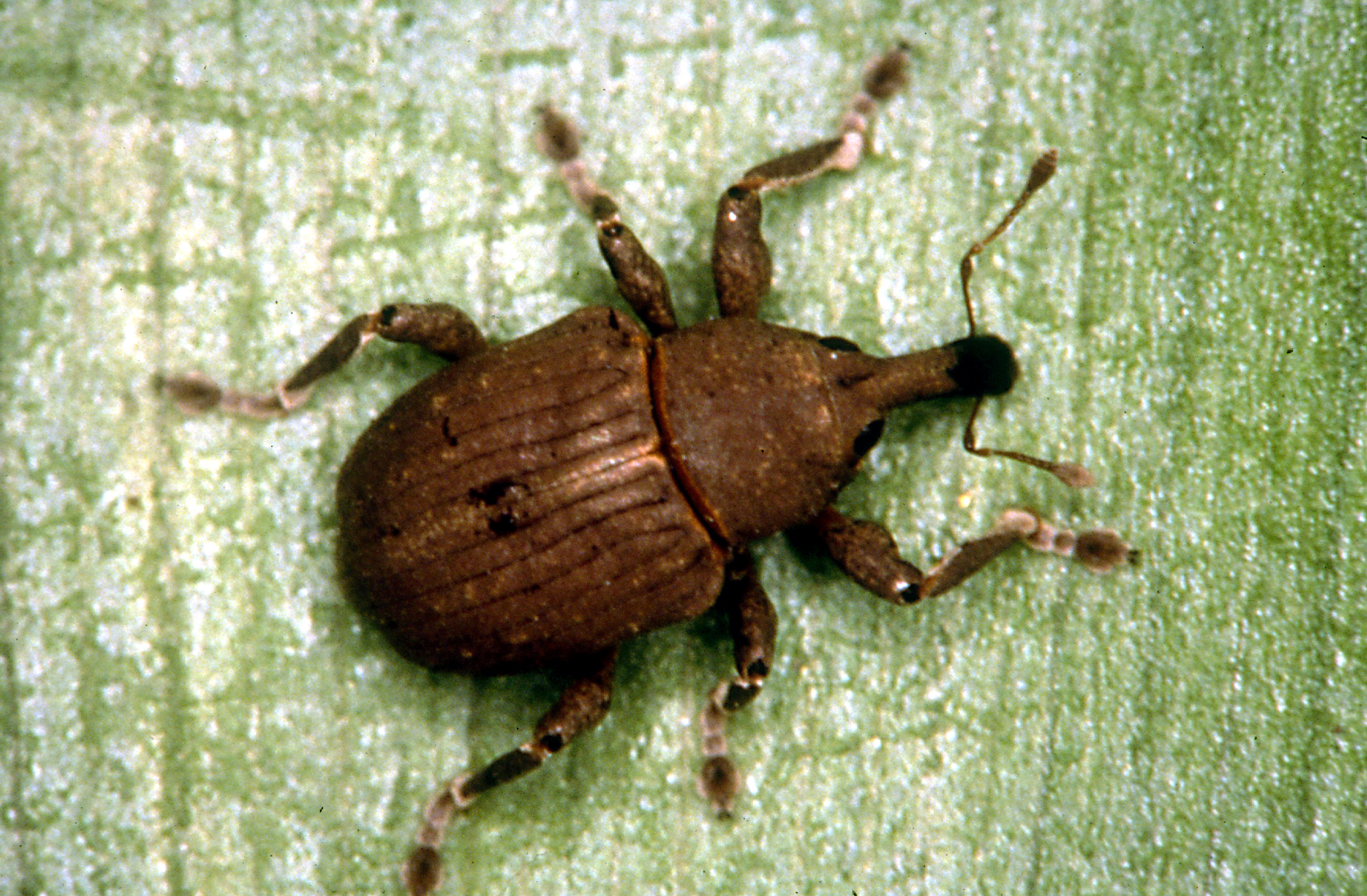

Scientific classification
- Domain: Eukaryota
- Kingdom: Animalia
- Phylum: Arthropoda
- Class: Insecta
- Order: Coleoptera
- Suborder: Polyphaga
- Infraorder: Cucujiformia
- Family: Brachyceridae
- Tribe: Erirhinini
- Genus: Neochetina
- Species: N. bruchi

Binomial name
- Neochetina bruchi Hustache, 1926

= Neochetina bruchi =

Species of beetle

Neochetina bruchi, the chevroned water hyacinth weevil, is a species of marsh weevil in the beetle family Brachyceridae found in South America. It has been introduced into North America as biocontrol of the invasive plant Eichhornia crassipes (water hyacinth).
