= Achenyo Idachaba =

Nigerian entrepreneur

- Born: c. 1968; United States of America
- Occupation: Entrepreneur
- Known for: Founder, MitiMeth

Achenyo Idachaba (born c. 1968) is an American-born entrepreneur based in Nigeria.

== Early life ==
Idachaba was born in America to Nigerian parents. She spent her early years in America before moving back to Nigeria with them. She worked as a computer scientist and business analyst before moving to Ibadan, Nigeria, in 2009 to set up an environmental consultancy.

== Career ==
She realised that water hyacinth (Pontederia crassipes), which was considered an invasive weed, could be harvested, as takes place in Asia. In collaboration with local craftspeople she designed products that could be woven from dried specimens. In 2011, she founded the company Mitimeth. She developed products such as a waste basket and a table tidy made from plants known as invasive. By 2013 she had won a grant from the government and employed seven staff. The weeds are harvested, dried and then made into rope which can then be made into final products.

In 2014 Idachaba won the Cartier Women's Initiative regional award for sub-Saharan Africa.
