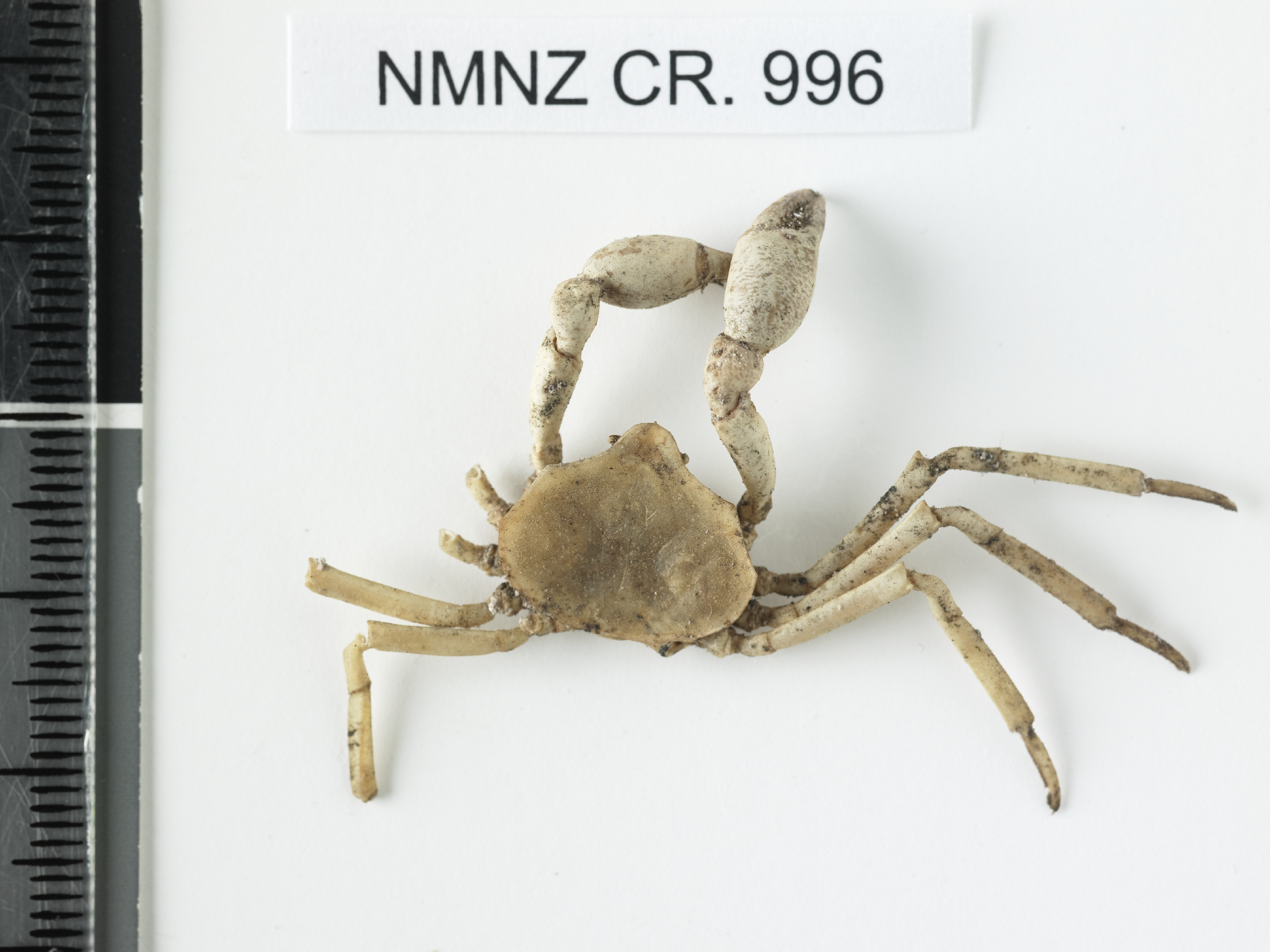

Scientific classification
- Kingdom: Animalia
- Phylum: Arthropoda
- Class: Malacostraca
- Order: Decapoda
- Suborder: Pleocyemata
- Infraorder: Brachyura
- Family: Hymenosomatidae
- Genus: Elamena; H. Milne-Edwards, 1837

= Elamena =

Genus of crabs

Elamena is a genus of crab, containing the following species:

- Elamena abrolhensis Gordon, 1940
- Elamena castanea Naruse, Mendoza & Ng, 2008
- Elamena cimex Kemp, 1915
- Elamena cristatipes Gravely, 1927
- Elamena globosa Chuang & Ng, 1991
- Elamena gordonae Monod, 1956
- Elamena gracilis Borradaile, 1903
- Elamena longidactylis Yang & Sun, 1998
- Elamena longirostris Filhol, 1885
- Elamena magnum Ng & Chuang, 1996
- Elamena mathoei (Desmarest, 1823)
- Elamena mendosa Chuang & Ng, 1991
- Elamena mexicana (H. Milne Edwards, 1853)
- Elamena momona Melrose, 1975
- Elamena panglao Naruse, Mendoza & Ng, 2009
- Elamena producta Kirk, 1879
- Elamena quoyi (H. Milne Edwards, 1853)
- Elamena rostrata Ng, Chen & Fang, 2000
- Elamena samalensis Husana, Kase & Mendoza, 2013
- Elamena simplidenta Ng & Chuang, 1996
- Elamena sindensis Alcock, 1900
- Elamena sundaica Ng & Chuang, 1996
- Elamena truncata (Stimpson, 1858)
- Elamena umerata Lucas, 1980
- Elamena vesca Ng & Richer de Forges, 1996
- Elamena xavieri Kemp, 1917
