= Alem Tena =

Town in Oromia Region, Ethiopia

Bote
- Town
- Nickname: Alem Tena
- Location within Ethiopia
- Coordinates: 08°18′N 38°57′E
- Country: Ethiopia
- Region: Oromia
- Zone: East Shewa
- Woreda: Bora
- Elevation: 1,611 m (5,285 ft)

Population (2005)
  - Total: 13,529
- Time zone: UTC+3 (EAT)
- Climate: Aw

Alem Tena is a town in central Ethiopia. It is the administrative center of Bora Woreda in the Misraq Shewa Zone of the Oromia Region. It has a latitude and longitude of 8.30°N 38.95°E with an elevation of 1,611 meters.

== Overview ==
Near Alem Tena is Lake Ellen, thought to be the site the invasive species Eichhornia crassipes (or water hyacinth) was introduced.

Based on figures from the Central Statistical Agency of Ethiopia published in 2005, Alem Tena has an estimated total population of 13,529 consisting of 6,605 men and 6,924 women.
