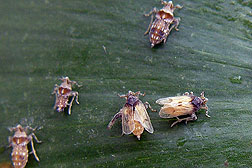

Scientific classification
- Kingdom: Animalia
- Phylum: Arthropoda
- Clade: Pancrustacea
- Class: Insecta
- Order: Hemiptera
- Suborder: Auchenorrhyncha
- Infraorder: Fulgoromorpha
- Family: Delphacidae
- Genus: Megamelus
- Species: M. scutellaris

Binomial name
- Megamelus scutellaris Berg, 1883

= Megamelus scutellaris =

Insect species

Megamelus scutellaris, the water hyacinth planthopper, is a true bug native to South America. It is used as a biological control agent to manage and reduce the spread of the water hyacinth (Pontederia crassipes, formerly Eichhornia crassipes), an invasive aquatic plant native to South America that has invaded many freshwater systems globally.

== Description ==
Megamelus scutellaris has a widespread distribution in South America. Populations have been recorded in Argentina, Brazil, Peru and Uruguay, and it is likely that the insect mirrors much of the distribution of its host plant, water hyacinth. It is primarily pale yellow to light brown in color with darker markings on the head and thorax. It measures approximately 3-4 mm in length, with a distinct, helmet-like scutellum covering most of its abdomen.

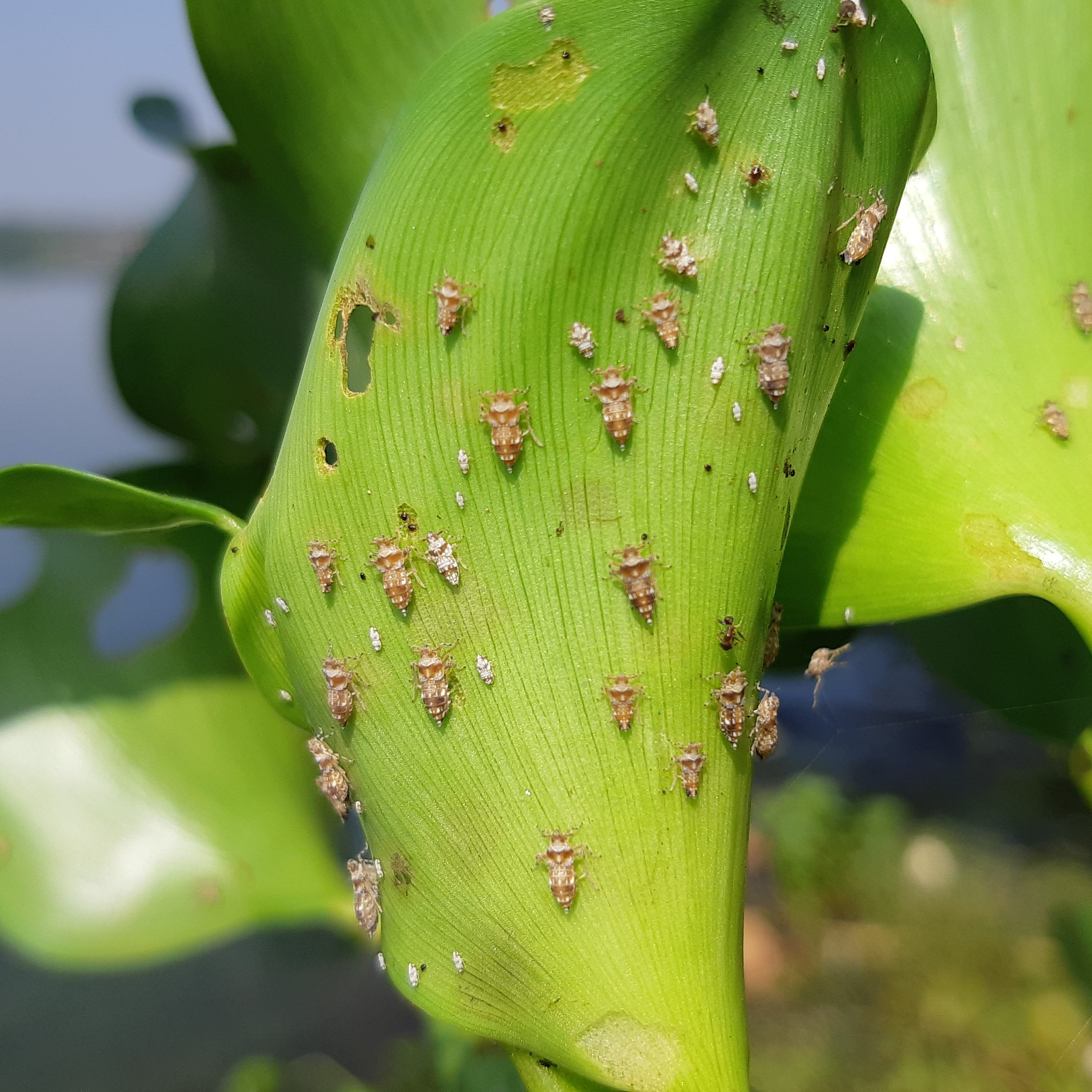
Wingless Megamelus scutellaris adults and nymphs on a water hyacinth leaf, Hartbeespoort Dam, South Africa.

The insect's life cycle consists of egg, nymph, and adult stages. They are wing dimorphic, whereby the adults can be either wingless (brachypterous) or winged (macropterous).

== Biological control of water hyacinth ==
Megamelus scutellaris is host-specific to water hyacinth, and has been introduced as a herbivore agent for the biological control of the noxious weed, causing damage to the plants and inhibiting their growth and reproduction. It was first introduced to Florida in 2010, where it subsequently established. It has been observed to thrive in cooler regions of the native water hyacinth range, which led to its introduction in 2013 to more temperate regions in South Africa as an effective biological control agent.

Both adult and nymph M. scutellaris feed on the water hyacinth plants. Adult females lay their eggs on the leaves and petioles of water hyacinth plants, and upon hatching, the nymphs feed on the plant tissues, progressing through five instar stages before reaching adulthood. This feeding results in biotic stress and increases the plant's susceptibility to disease. Under extensive feeding pressure, the plants may eventually succumb, causing them to sink and consequently leading to a decline in the water hyacinth population.
