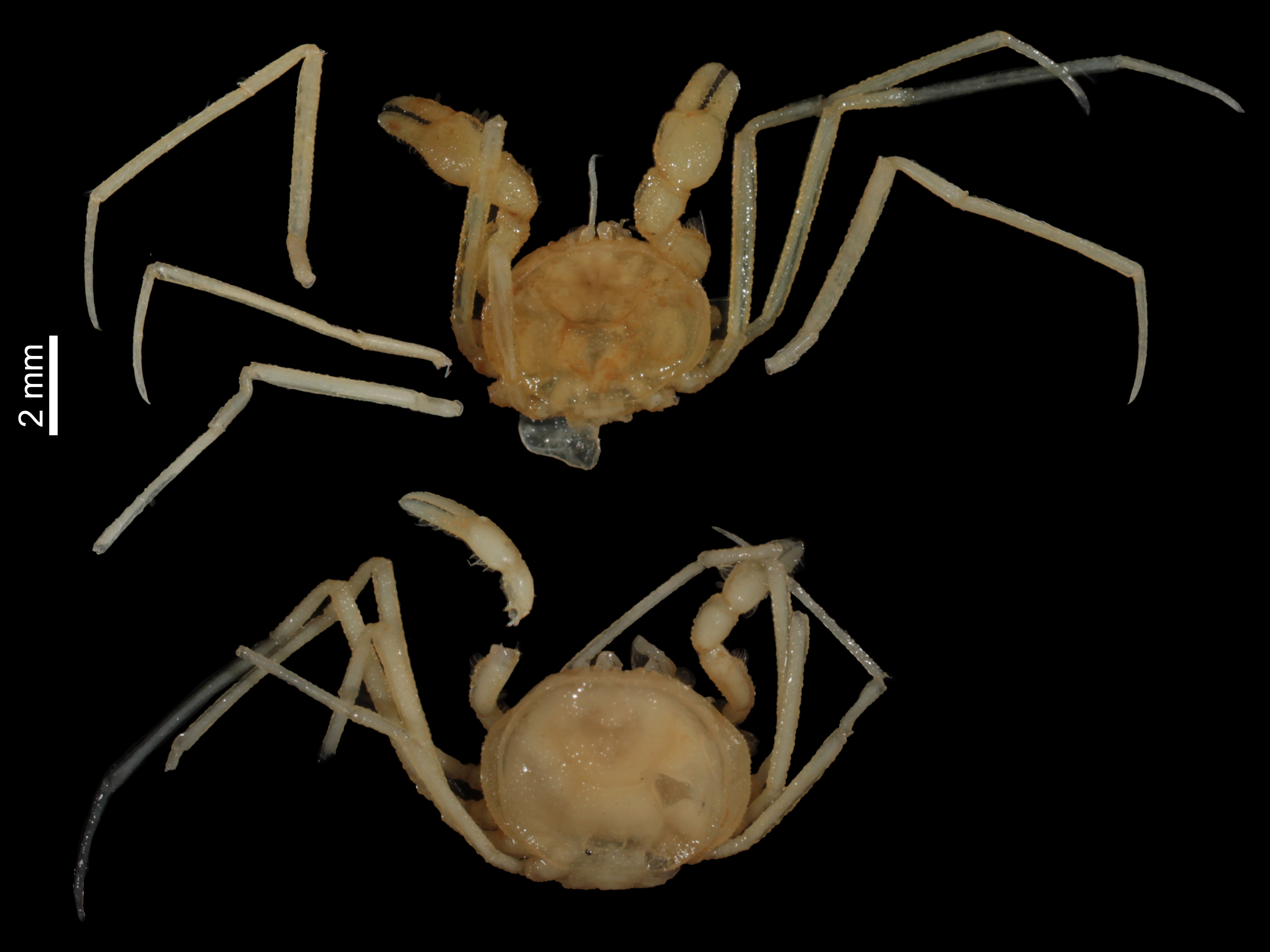

Scientific classification
- Domain: Eukaryota
- Kingdom: Animalia
- Phylum: Arthropoda
- Class: Malacostraca
- Order: Decapoda
- Suborder: Pleocyemata
- Infraorder: Brachyura
- Family: Hymenosomatidae
- Genus: Cancrocaeca; Ng, 1991
- Species: C. xenomorpha

Binomial name
- Cancrocaeca xenomorpha Ng, 1991

= Cancrocaeca =

Cancrocaeca xenomorpha

Genus of crabs

Cancrocaeca xenomorpha is a species of troglobitic (cave-dwelling) freshwater crab from Sulawesi, the only species in the monotypic genus Cancrocaeca. It has been described as the world's "most highly cave-adapted species of crab".

== Description ==
Cancrocaeca xenomorpha is a small crab with long legs. It has no eyes or even vestiges of eyestalks, and has only vague depressions where the orbits of the eyes might be expected; this is the greatest degree of ocular degeneration of any crab. The carapace is rounded in outline, without any rostrum, and is slightly wider than it is long. The five pairs of legs are very long, at up to 3.7 times the width of the carapace in length.

Females are slightly larger than males, at up to 6.2 mm × 5.6 mm (0.24 in × 0.22 in) across the carapace, compared to 4.7 mm × 4.1 mm (0.19 in × 0.16 in) for males. Females also appear to be a darker colour, but only because of the presence of mud particles on the carapace; both sexes are naturally unpigmented.

== Distribution ==
Cancrocaeca is known only from fresh water in three karstic caves in Maros Regency, Sulawesi (Indonesia). At the time of its discovery, no troglobitic members of the family Hymenosomatidae were known, although Danièle Guinot had predicted in 1988 that the family was a likely candidate to produce troglobites. Since that time, further troglobitic species have been discovered in the same family; although they resemble Cancrocaeca superficially, this is thought to result from convergent evolution, and it is thought likely that Cancrocaeca arose recently from marine ancestors.

== Biology ==
The biology of Cancrocaeca is almost entirely unknown. The original collections were often found in association with pieces of driftwood washed into the caves from outside, and were found in water at about 25.8 °C (78.4 °F). The eggs are around 0.6 millimetres (0.024 in) in diameter, requiring gonopores that are 15%–25% as wide as the sternum. Because its eggs are large, it is thought that the larval development may be abbreviated, and that the species may even show direct development, hatching from the eggs as juvenile crabs, rather than as larvae.

== Taxonomic history ==
Cancrocaeca was discovered in a cave in southern Sulawesi in 1989, as part of an expedition by the Association Pyrénéenne de Spéléologie ("Pyrenean Speleological Association"); the expedition collected a number of crabs and sent them to Peter K. L. Ng of the National University of Singapore for identification. Among a large number of Parathelphusa specimens, he discovered a single male of Cancrocaeca. A subsequent expedition in 1990 provided further specimens, including females. The species was described, in a new genus, in a 1991 publication in the Raffles Bulletin of Zoology. The genus name Cancrocaeca is said to be derived from cancer, the Latin for "crab", and caecus, Latin for "blind". The specific epithet xenomorpha is said to be derived from Greek xenos for "strange" and Greek morphos for "morphology", because of the crab's unusual features. In ancient Greek, morphos is not attested, while morphē (μορφή) means "shape" or "form".
