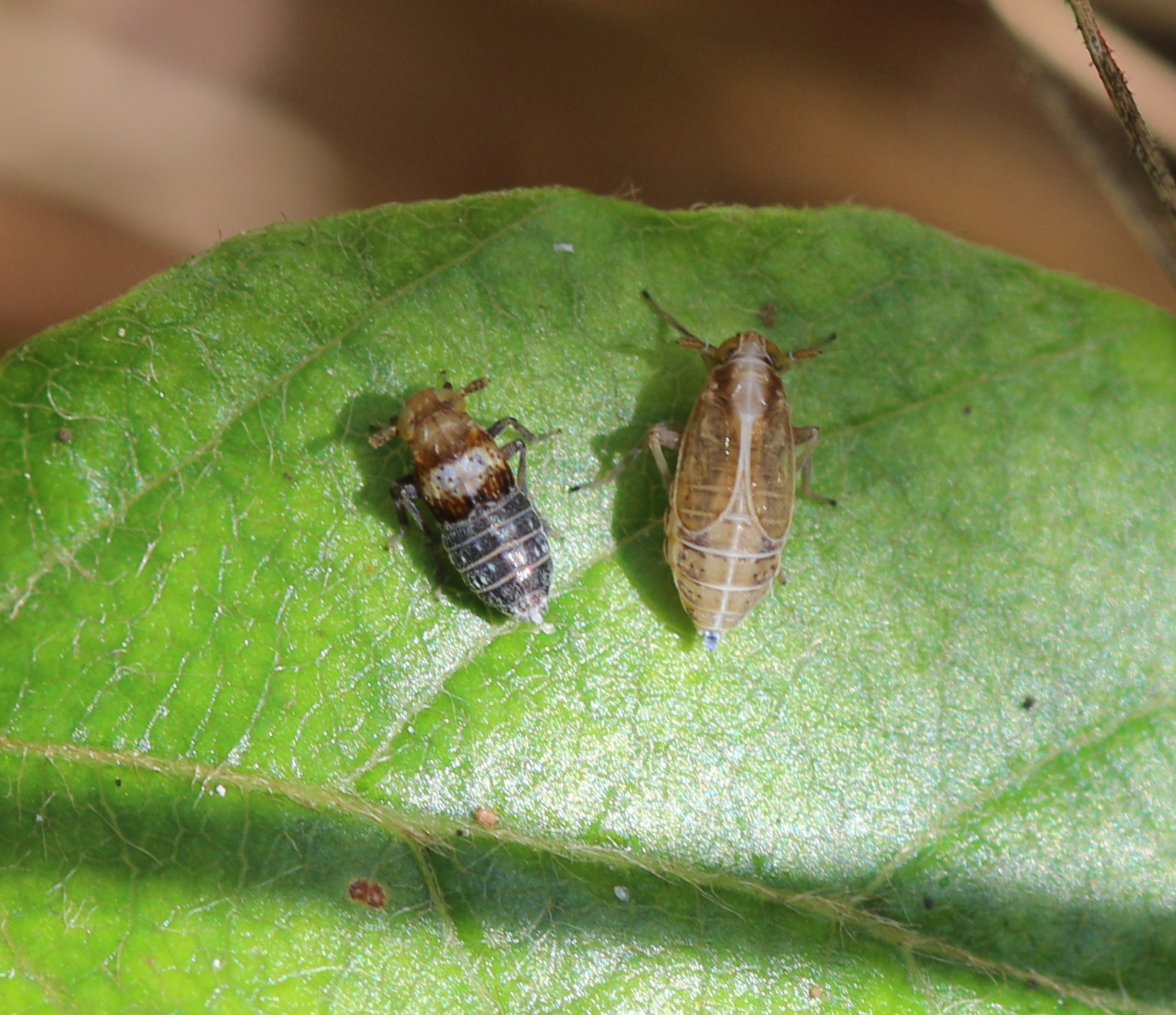
- Megamelus notula

Scientific classification
- Domain: Eukaryota
- Kingdom: Animalia
- Phylum: Arthropoda
- Class: Insecta
- Order: Hemiptera
- Suborder: Auchenorrhyncha
- Infraorder: Fulgoromorpha
- Family: Delphacidae
- Tribe: Delphacini
- Genus: Megamelus; Fieber, 1866

= Megamelus =

Genus of true bugs

Megamelus is a genus of delphacid planthoppers in the family Delphacidae. There are at least 30 described species in Megamelus.

== Species ==
These 37 species belong to the genus Megamelus:

- Megamelus aestus Metcalf, 1923^{i c g}
- Megamelus bellicus Remes Lenicov and Sosa in Sosa, Remes Lenicov and Mariani, 2007^{i c g}
- Megamelus bifidus Beamer, 1955^{i c g}
- Megamelus bifurcatus Crawford, 1914^{i c g}
- Megamelus coronus Beamer, 1955^{i c g}
- Megamelus davisi Van Duzee, 1897^{i c g b}
- Megamelus discrepans Haupt, 1930^{i c g}
- Megamelus distinctus Metcalf, 1923^{i c g b}
- Megamelus electrae Muir, 1926^{i c g}
- Megamelus falcatus Beamer, 1955^{i c g}
- Megamelus flavus Crawford, 1914^{i c g}
- Megamelus gracilis Beamer, 1955^{i c g b}
- Megamelus hamatus Beamer, 1955^{i c g}
- Megamelus inflatus Metcalf, 1923^{i c g}
- Megamelus iphigeniae Muir, 1926^{i c g}
- Megamelus kahus (Kirkaldy, 1907)^{c g}
- Megamelus leimonias (Kirkaldy, 1907)^{i c g}
- Megamelus leptus Fieber, 1878^{i c g}
- Megamelus lobatus Beamer, 1955^{i c g}
- Megamelus longicornis (Dozier, 1922)^{i c g}
- Megamelus lunatus Beamer, 1955^{i c g b}
- Megamelus metzaria Crawford, 1914^{i c g b}
- Megamelus notula (Germar, 1830)^{i}
- Megamelus notulus (Germar, 1830)^{c g}
- Megamelus palaetus (Van Duzee, 1897)^{i c g b}
- Megamelus paludicola Lindberg, 1937^{c g}
- Megamelus piceus Van Duzee, 1894^{g}
- Megamelus quadrimaculatus (Signoret, 1865)^{c g}
- Megamelus recurvatus Beamer, 1955^{i c g}
- Megamelus scutellaris Berg, 1883^{i c g}
- Megamelus spartini Osborn, 1905^{c g}
- Megamelus sponsa Kirkaldy, 1907^{i c g}
- Megamelus timehri Muir, 1919^{i c g}
- Megamelus toddi Beamer, 1955^{i c g}
- Megamelus trifidus Beamer, 1955^{i c g}
- Megamelus ungulatus Beamer, 1955^{i c g}
- Megamelus venosus (Germar, 1830)^{c g}

Data sources: i = ITIS, c = Catalogue of Life, g = GBIF, b = Bugguide.net
