= Megamelus distinctus =

Scientific classification
- Domain: Eukaryota
- Kingdom: Animalia
- Phylum: Arthropoda
- Class: Insecta
- Order: Hemiptera
- Suborder: Auchenorrhyncha
- Infraorder: Fulgoromorpha
- Family: Delphacidae
- Genus: Megamelus
- Species: M. distinctus

Binomial name
- Megamelus distinctus Metcalf, 1923

Species of true bug

Megamelus distinctus is a species of delphacid planthopper in the family Delphacidae. It is found in North America.
