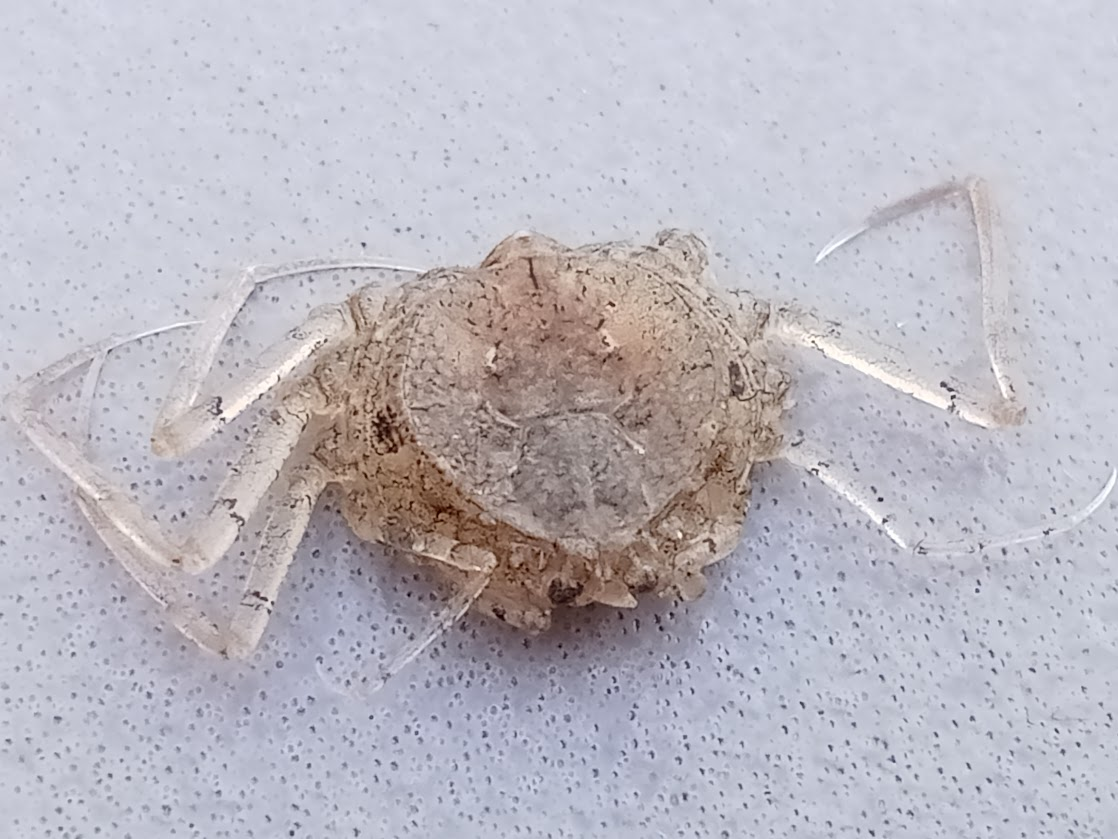
- Hymenosoma longicrure female from the Kwanyambalala Estuary, South Africa

Scientific classification
- Kingdom: Animalia
- Phylum: Arthropoda
- Class: Malacostraca
- Order: Decapoda
- Suborder: Pleocyemata
- Infraorder: Brachyura
- Family: Hymenosomatidae
- Genus: Hymenosoma; Desmarest, 1823

= Hymenosoma =

Genus of crabs

Hymenosoma (crown crabs) is a genus of crabs, containing the following species:

- Hymenosoma crosnieri Naruse & Guinot, 2023
- Hymenosoma depressum Hombron & Jacquinot, 1846
- Hymenosoma gaudichaudii Guérin, 1831
- Hymenosoma geometricum Stimpson, 1858
- Hymenosoma hodgkini Lucas, 1980
- Hymenosoma longicrure Dawson & Griffiths, 2012
- Hymenosoma lurio Poore, Jaime & Teske, 2025
- Hymenosoma orbiculare Desmarest, 1823
- Hymenosoma projectum Dawson & Griffiths, 2012
- Hymenosoma trilobatum Dawson & Griffiths, 2012

The majority of the species are found around southern Africa; the Australasian species H. depressum, H. gaudichaudii and H. hodgkini may be better placed in other genera.
