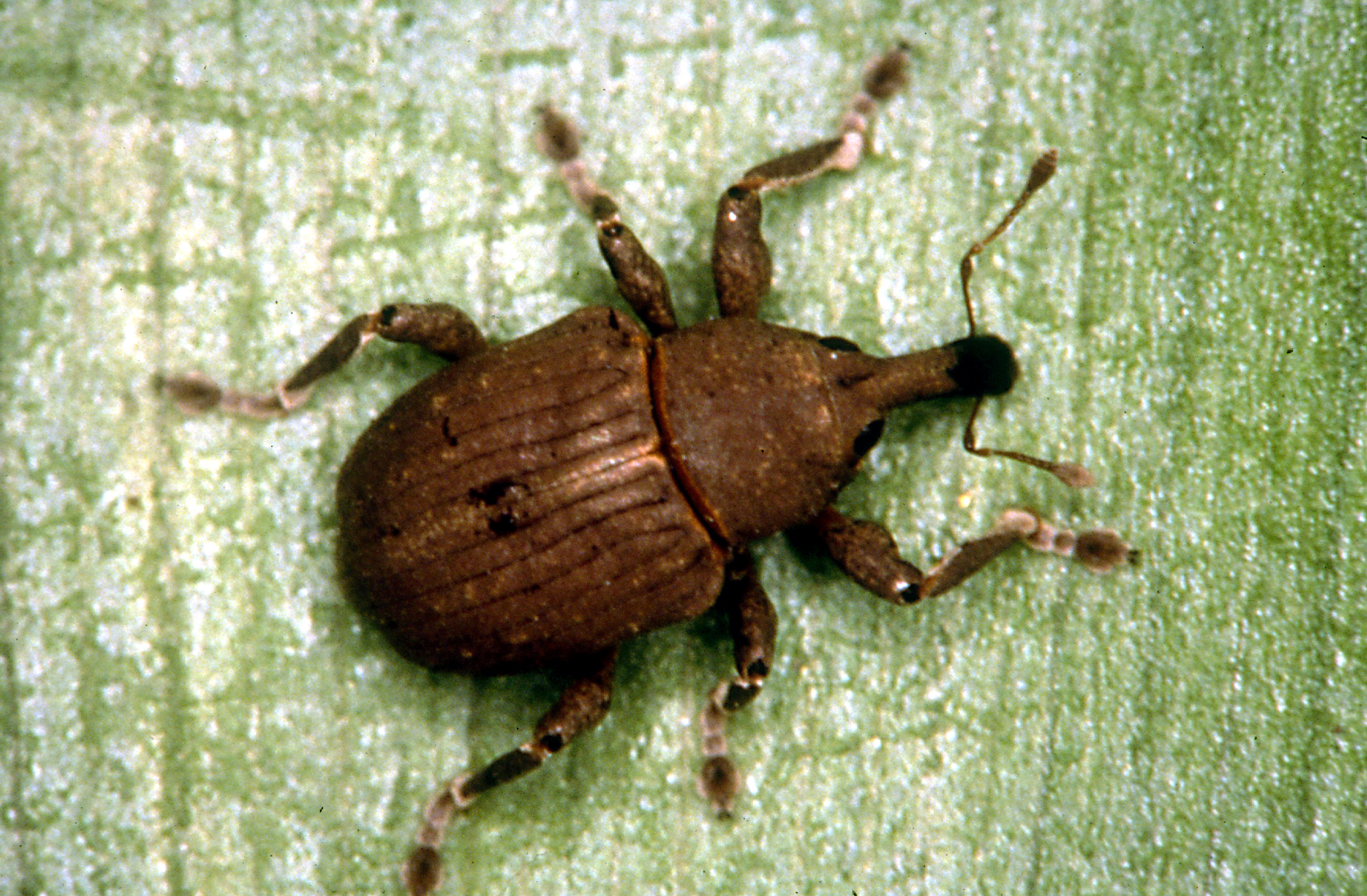
- Neochetina bruchi

Scientific classification
- Domain: Eukaryota
- Kingdom: Animalia
- Phylum: Arthropoda
- Class: Insecta
- Order: Coleoptera
- Suborder: Polyphaga
- Infraorder: Cucujiformia
- Family: Brachyceridae
- Subfamily: Brachycerinae
- Tribe: Erirhinini
- Genus: Neochetina; Hustache, 1926

Species
- N. eichhorniae N. bruchi

= Neochetina =

Genus of beetles

Neochetina is a genus of weevils known as water hyacinth weevil which are native to South America.

Neochetina feed almost exclusively on the highly vigorous water hyacinth (Eichhornia spp.). There are at least two species: N. eichhorniae or mottled water hyacinth weevil which gets its name from the plant it feeds on and N. bruchi or chevroned water hyacinth weevil which is characterized by a chevron–shaped marking on its back.

Both weevils have been introduced extensively in countries around the world to help control water hyacinth growth which threatens to choke numerous waterways and lakes worldwide.
