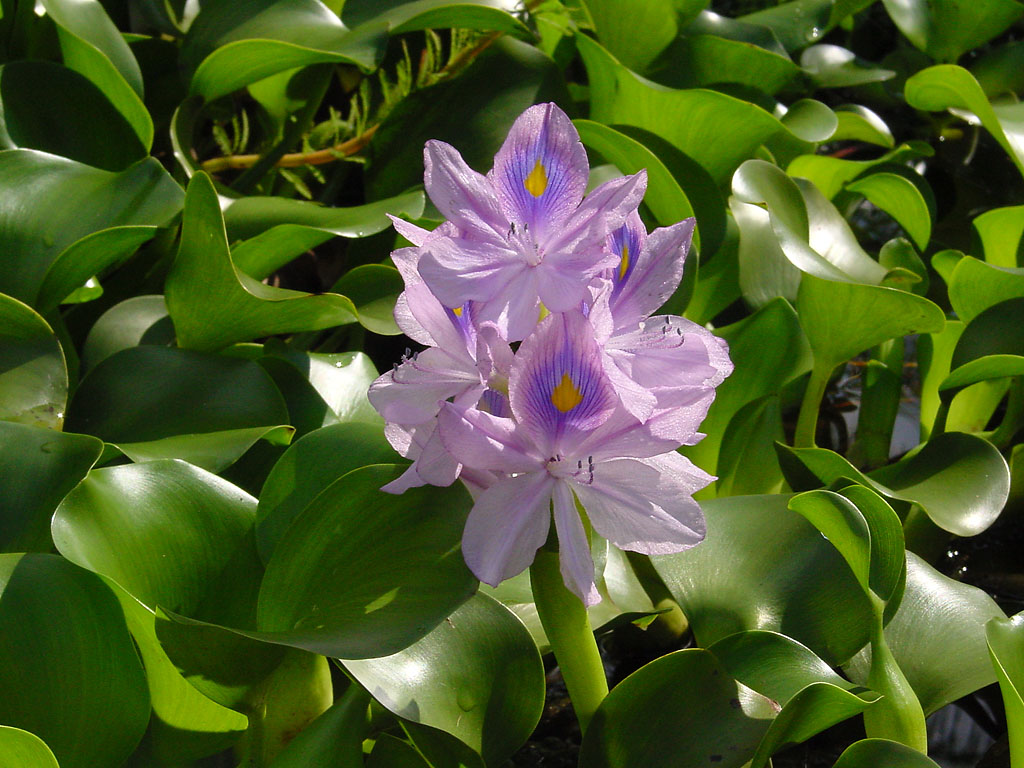

Conservation status
- Secure (NatureServe)

Scientific classification
- Kingdom: Plantae
- Clade: Tracheophytes
- Clade: Angiosperms
- Clade: Monocots
- Clade: Commelinids
- Order: Commelinales
- Family: Pontederiaceae
- Genus: Pontederia
- Species: P. crassipes

Binomial name
- Pontederia crassipes Mart.

Synonyms
- Eichhornia crassipes (Mart.) Solms; Eichhornia cordifolia Gand.; Eichhornia crassicaulis Schltdl.; Eichhornia speciosa Kunth; Heteranthera formosa Miq.; Piaropus crassipes (Mart.) Raf.; Piaropus mesomelas Raf.; Pontederia crassicaulis Schltdl.; Pontederia elongata Balf.

= Pontederia crassipes =

Common water hyacinth

Aquatic plant native to the Amazon basin

Pontederia crassipes (formerly Eichhornia crassipes), commonly known as common water hyacinth, is an aquatic plant native to South America, naturalized throughout the world, and often invasive outside its native range. It is the sole species of the subgenus Oshunae within the genus Pontederia. Anecdotally, it is known as the "terror of Bengal" due to its invasive growth tendencies.

== Description ==
Water hyacinth is a free-floating perennial aquatic plant (or hydrophyte) native to tropical and subtropical South America. With broad, thick, glossy, ovate leaves, water hyacinth may rise above the surface of the water as much as 1 m (3 ft) in height. The leaves are 10–20 cm (4–8 inches) across on a stem, which is floating by means of buoyant bulb-like nodules at its base above the water surface. They have long, spongy, bulbous stalks. The feathery, freely hanging roots are purple-black. An erect stalk supports a single spike of 8–15 conspicuously attractive flowers, mostly lavender to pink in colour with six petals. When not in bloom, water hyacinth may be mistaken for frogbit (Limnobium spongia) or Amazon frogbit (Limnobium laevigatum).

One of the fastest-growing plants known, water hyacinth reproduces primarily by way of runners or stolons, which eventually form daughter plants. Each plant additionally can produce thousands of seeds each year, and these seeds can remain viable for more than 28 years. Common water hyacinths are vigorous growers, and mats can double in size in one to two weeks. In terms of plant count rather than size, they are said to multiply by more than a hundredfold in number in a matter of 23 days.

In their native range, the flowers are pollinated by long-tongued bees. These plants can reproduce both sexually and clonally. The invasiveness of the hyacinth is related to its ability to clone itself, and large patches are likely to all be part of the same genetic form.

Water hyacinth has three flower morphs and is termed "tristylous". The flower morphs are named for the length of their pistils: long (L), medium (M), and short (S). Tristylous populations are, however, limited to the native lowland South American range of water hyacinth; in the introduced range, the M-morph prevails, with the L-morph occurring occasionally and the S-morph absent altogether. This geographical distribution of the floral morphs indicates that founder events have played a prominent role in the species' worldwide spread.

== Habitat and ecology ==
Its habitat ranges from tropical desert to subtropical or warm, temperate desert to rainforest zones. The temperature tolerance of the water hyacinth is:

- Its minimum growth temperature is 12 °C (54 °F)
- Its optimum growth temperature is 25–30 °C (77–86 °F)
- Its maximum growth temperature is 33–35 °C (91–95 °F)

Its pH tolerance is estimated at 5.0–7.5. Leaves are killed by frost and plants do not tolerate water temperatures more than 34 °C (93 °F). Water hyacinths do not grow where the average salinity is greater than 15% that of sea water (around 5 g salt per kg). In brackish water, its leaves show epinasty and chlorosis, and eventually die. Rafts of harvested water hyacinth have been floated to the sea, which kills it.

Azotobacter chroococcum, a species of nitrogen-fixing bacteria, is probably concentrated around the bases of the petioles, but the bacteria do not fix nitrogen unless the plant is suffering extreme nitrogen deficiency.

Fresh plants contain prickly crystals. This plant is reported to contain hydrogen cyanide, alkaloids, and triterpenoids, and may induce itching. Plants sprayed with 2,4-dichlorophenoxyacetic acid (2,4-D) may accumulate lethal doses of nitrates and other harmful elements in polluted environments.

== Invasive species ==
Water hyacinth grows and reproduces quickly, so it can cover large portions of ponds and lakes. It can easily coexist with other invasive plants and native plants in an area. Particularly vulnerable are bodies of water that have already been affected by human activities, such as artificial reservoirs or eutrophied lakes that receive large amounts of nutrients. It outcompetes native aquatic plants, both floating and submerged. In 2011, Wu Fuqin et al. tracked the results of Yunnan Dianchi Lake and also showed that water hyacinth could affect the photosynthesis of phytoplankton, submerged plants, and algae by water environment quality and inhibit their growth. The decay process depletes dissolved oxygen in the water, often killing fish.

Water hyacinth can absorb a large amount of harmful heavy metals and other substances. After death, it rots and sinks to the bottom of the water, causing secondary pollution to the water body, destroying the natural water quality, and may even affect the quality of residents' drinking water in severe cases. Water where water hyacinth grows heavily is often a breeding place for disease vectors (e.g. mosquitoes and snails) and harmful pathogens, posing a potential threat to the health of local residents. It is very critical to monitor areas quickly that are infested in order to efficiently reduce or control the growth of these species. Water hyacinth can also provide a food source for goldfish, keep water clean, and help with oxygenation. Invertebrate species harboring with water hyacinth are dispersed as phytochores.

The invasion of water hyacinth also has socioeconomic consequences. Since water hyacinth is composed of up to 95% water, its evapotranspiration rate is high. As such, small lakes that have been covered with the species can dry out and leave communities without adequate water or food supply. In some areas, dense mats of water hyacinth prevent the use of a waterway, leading to the loss of transportation (both human and cargo), as well as a loss of fishing possibilities. Large sums of money are allocated to the removal of water hyacinth from the water bodies as well as figuring out how to destroy the remains harvested. Harvesting water hyacinth mechanically requires considerable effort. A million tons of fresh biomass would require 75 trucks with a capacity of 40 m^{3}, per day, for 365 days to get rid of it. The water hyacinth would then be transferred to a dumping site and allowed to decompose, which releases CO_{2}, methane, and nitrogen oxides.

Water hyacinth has been widely introduced in North America, Europe, Asia, Australia, Africa, and New Zealand. In many areas, it has become an important and pernicious invasive species. In New Zealand, it is listed on the National Pest Plant Accord, which prevents it from being propagated, distributed, or sold. In large water areas such as Louisiana, the Kerala Backwaters in India, Tonlé Sap in Cambodia, and Lake Victoria, it has become a serious pest. The common water hyacinth has become an invasive plant species on Lake Victoria in Africa after it was introduced into the area in the 1980s.

A 1.22 Gb/8 chromosome reference genome was assembled to study nuclear and chloroplast genomes between 10 water hyacinth lines from 3 continents. Results indicate the spread of a limited genotype of water hyacinth from South America, where it has the highest genetic diversity. The paper proposes the spread potentially originating from ships travelling from Itajaí Port on the Brazilian East Coast. However, genetic studies on samples from Bangladesh and Indonesia demonstrate different genotypes, potentially implicating multiple introduction vectors.

Further, the genomic study also revealed the adaptation in four key pathways; plant-pathogen interaction, plant-hormone signal transduction, photosynthesis and abiotic stress tolerance, which provide water hyacinth to expand its niche and compete with other native flora.

=== United States ===
==== Introduction into the U.S. ====
Various accounts are given as to how the water hyacinth was introduced to the United States. (Note: Including indication that these were grown in nurseries and landscapes soon after the American Civil War (ended 1865).)

1884 Exposition

The claim that the water hyacinth was introduced to the U.S. in 1884 at the World's Fair in New Orleans, also known as the World Cotton Centennial, has been characterized as the "first authentic account", as well as "local legend".

Alleged Japanese involvement

At some point, a legend arose that the plants had been given away as a gift by a Japanese delegation at the fair. (Note: Claimed in Major James Brown (1941), Vietmeyer (1975), Wolverton & McDonald (1979), p. 2, Barrett (2004), p. 92, and Mooallem (2013) as delineated below.) This claim is absent in a pertinent article published in a military engineer's trade journal dating to 1940, (Note: Note that military engineers were tasked with the removal of water hyacinths in the South, as explained below.) but appears in a piece penned in 1941 by the director of the wildlife and fisheries division at the Louisiana Department of Conservation, where the author writes, "the Japanese government maintained a Japanese building" at the fair, and the "Japanese staff imported from Venezuela considerable numbers of water hyacinth, which were given away as souvenirs". (Note: Brown (1941) also wrongly claims the species to be "a native to Japan", p. 9. Brown appears in a photograph on p. 12.) The claim has been repeated by later writers, with various shifts in the details. Thus National Academy of Sciences fellow Noel D. Vietmeyer (1975) wrote that "Japanese entrepreneurs" introduced the plant into the U.S., and the plants had been "collected from the Orinoco River in Venezuela." This claim was echoed by a pair of NASA researchers (Wolverton & McDonald 1979), who asserted that the souvenir plants were carelessly dumped in various waterways. Canadian biologist Spencer C. H. Barrett (2004) meanwhile favored the theory they were first cultivated in garden ponds, after which they multiplied and escaped to the environs. The account gains different details as told by children's story-teller Carole Marsh (1992), who says "Japan gave away water hyacinth seeds" during the exposition, and another Southern raconteur, Gaspar J. "Buddy" Stall (1998), assured his readership that the Japanese gave each family a package of those seeds.

Other means of introduction

One paper has also inquired into the role which catalog sales of seeds and plants may have played in the dissemination of invasive plants. P. crassipes was found to have been offered in the 1884 issue of Bordentown, New Jersey–based Edmund D. Sturtevant's Catalogue of Rare Water Lilies and Other Choice Aquatic Plants, and Haage & Schmidt of Germany has offered the plant since 1864 (when the firm was founded). By 1895, it was offered by seed purveyors in the states of New Jersey, New York, California, and Florida. (Note: It might be also noted that when the World's Fair returned to the U.S. in 1993 and was held in Chicago (World's Columbian Exposition), Edmund D. Sturtevant was there displaying his water lilies.)

Harper's Weekly magazine (1895) printed an anecdotal account stating that a certain man from New Orleans collected and brought home water hyacinths from Colombia, around 1892, and the plant proliferated in a matter of 2 years.

==== Infestation and control in the Southeast ====
As the hyacinths multiply into mats, they may be detrimental to some species of fish, and choke waterways for boating and shipping. This effect was already observed in the state of Louisiana by the turn of the 20th century.

The plant was introduced in Florida in 1890, accumulating an estimated plant mass of 50 kg/m^{2} and clogging St. Johns River. In 1897 the government dispatched a task force of the United States Army Corps of Engineers to solve the water hyacinth problem plaguing Gulf states such as Florida and Louisiana. (Note: The term "board of engineer officer" is used, but the biography from one of its members, in the West Point graduate roll, shows he was from the Army Corps of Engineers.)

In the early 20th century, the U.S. War Department (i.e., the Army Corps of Engineers) tested various means of eradicating the plants, including jet-streaming steam and hot water, applying various strong acids or petroleum followed by incineration. (Note: The 1903 Experiment Report has "petroleum", whereas Klorer 1909, p. 443 writes "Beaumont fuel oil".) Spraying with saturated salt solution killed the plants but was considered prohibitively expensive. The engineers selected Harvesta brand herbicide, whose active ingredient was arsenic acid, as the optimal cost-effective tool for eradication. This herbicide was used until 1905, when it was substituted with a different, white arsenic–based compound. An engineer charged with the spraying did not think the poison to be a matter of concern, stating that the crew of the spraying boat would routinely catch fish from their working areas and consume them. However, spraying had little hope of completely eradicating the water hyacinth, due to the vastness of escaped colonies and the inaccessibility of some of the infested areas, and the engineer suggested that some biological means of control may be needed.

In 1910 the New Foods Society suggested to import and release hippopotamus from Africa into the rivers and bayous of Louisiana to eat the water hyacinth and solve another serious problem at the time, the American meat crisis. Known as the American Hippo Bill, H.R. 23621 was introduced by Louisiana Congressman Robert Broussard and debated by the Agricultural Committee of the U.S. House of Representatives. The chief collaborators in the New Foods Society and proponents of Broussard's bill were Major Frederick Russell Burnham, the celebrated American Scout, and Captain Fritz Duquesne, a South African Scout who later became a notorious spy for Germany. Presenting before the Agricultural Committee, Burnham made the point that none of the animals that Americans ate (chickens, pigs, cattle, sheep, or lambs) were native to the U.S. and had all been imported by European settlers centuries before, so Americans should not hesitate to introduce hippopotamus and other large animals into the American diet. Duquesne, who was born and raised in South Africa, further noted that European settlers on that continent commonly included hippopotamus, ostrich, antelope, and other African wildlife in their diets and suffered no ill effects. The American Hippo Bill fell one vote short of passage.

Water hyacinths have also been introduced into waters inhabited by manatees in Florida, for the purpose of bioremediation (cf. §Phytoremediation below) of the waters that have become contaminated and fallen victim to algal blooming. The manatees include the water hyacinth in their diet, but it may not be the food of first choice for them.

==== Legality of sale and shipment in the United States ====
In 1956, E. crassipes was banned for sale or shipment in the United States, subject to a fine and/or imprisonment. This law was repealed by H.R. 133 of the 116th Congress (2019–2021) on December 27, 2020.

=== Africa ===
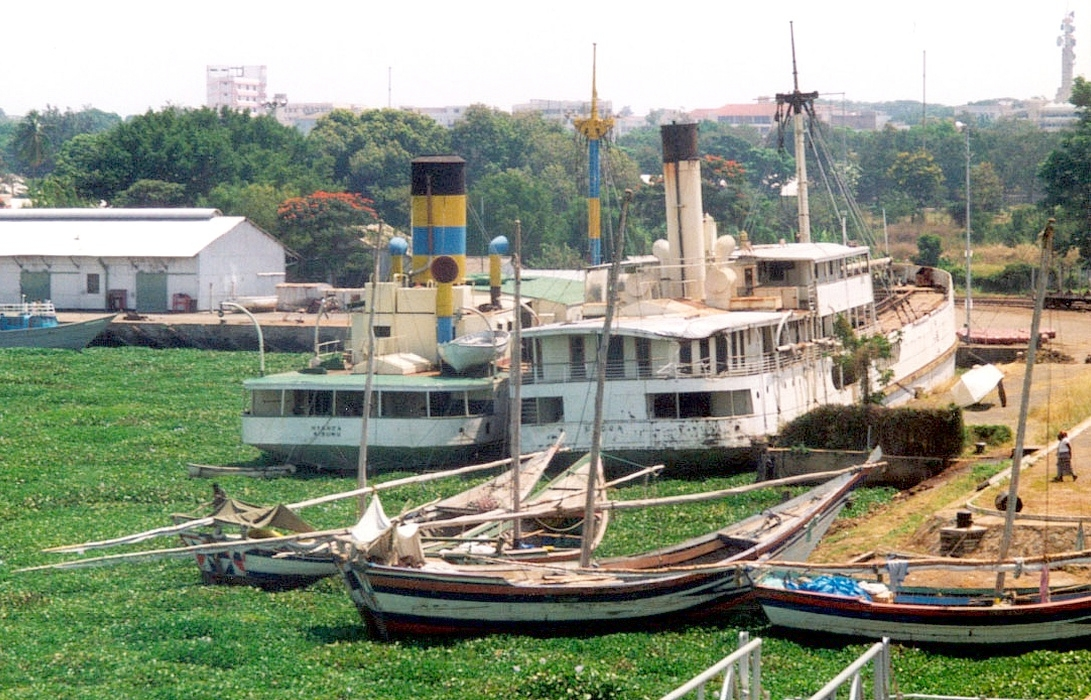
Water hyacinth at Kisumu Port

The water hyacinth may have been introduced into Egypt in the late 18th to early 19th century during Muhammad Ali of Egypt's era, but was not recognized as an invasive threat until 1879. The invasion into Egypt is dated between 1879 and 1892 by Brij Gopal.

The plant (Afrikaans: waterhiasint) arguably invaded South Africa in 1910, (Note: Dutoit. R., (1938). "Water hyacinth". Farming South Africa 13, 16–17, apud Ashton et al. (1979), p. 303) although earlier dates have been claimed. (Note: The 1884 dating given by R. L. Kluge (1978) (also C. H. Stirton (1983)) is refuted by Ashton et al. (1979), p. 303 as a mistake for the year it was introduced into the U. S., 1884 (year of the World's Fair in New Orleans, Louisiana). Kitunda (2017), pp. 107–108 cites Zimmermann, H. G. et al. (2007), that the plant was distributed at the 1904 St. Louis World's Fair, aka "Louisiana Purchase Exposition", and this was one possible route of transmission to South Africa in 1910.) (Note: The more ambitious by Kitunda (2017), p. xv dating to 1829 due to William Townsend Aiton of Kew Gardens does not pan out, since the pointed source, Curtis's Botanical Magazine (1829) merely states Aiton made the plant available then to Glasgow Botanic Gardens.) A waterbody extensively threatened by water hyacinth is the Hartebeespoort Dam near Brits in North West Province.

The plant was introduced by Belgian colonists to Rwanda to beautify their holdings. It then advanced by natural means to Lake Victoria, where it was first sighted in 1988. There, without any natural enemies, it has become an ecological plague, suffocating the lake, diminishing the fish reservoir, and hurting the local economies. It impedes access to Kisumu and other harbors.

The water hyacinth has also appeared in Ethiopia, where it was first reported in 1965 at the Koka Reservoir and in the Awash River, where the Ethiopian Electric Light and Power Authority has managed to bring it under moderate control at considerable cost of human labor. Other infestations in Ethiopia include many bodies of water in the Gambela Region, the Blue Nile from Lake Tana into Sudan, and Lake Ellen near Alem Tena. By 2018, it has become a serious problem on Lake Tana in Ethiopia.

The water hyacinth is also present on the Shire River in the Liwonde National Park in Malawi.

=== Asia ===
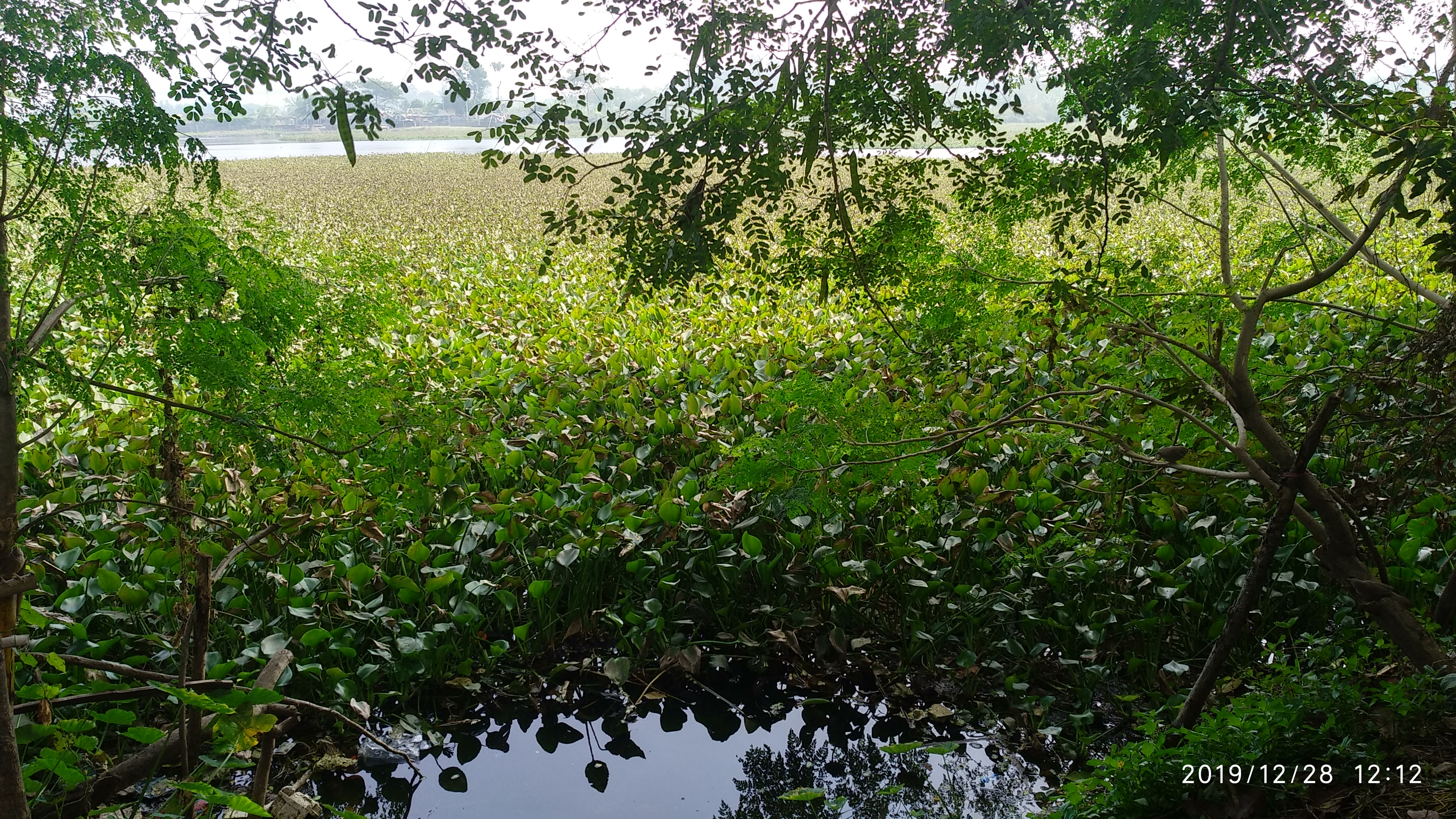
Haldia Municipality Pool, a public water reservoir is being choked by growing water hyacinth population as in December 2019.

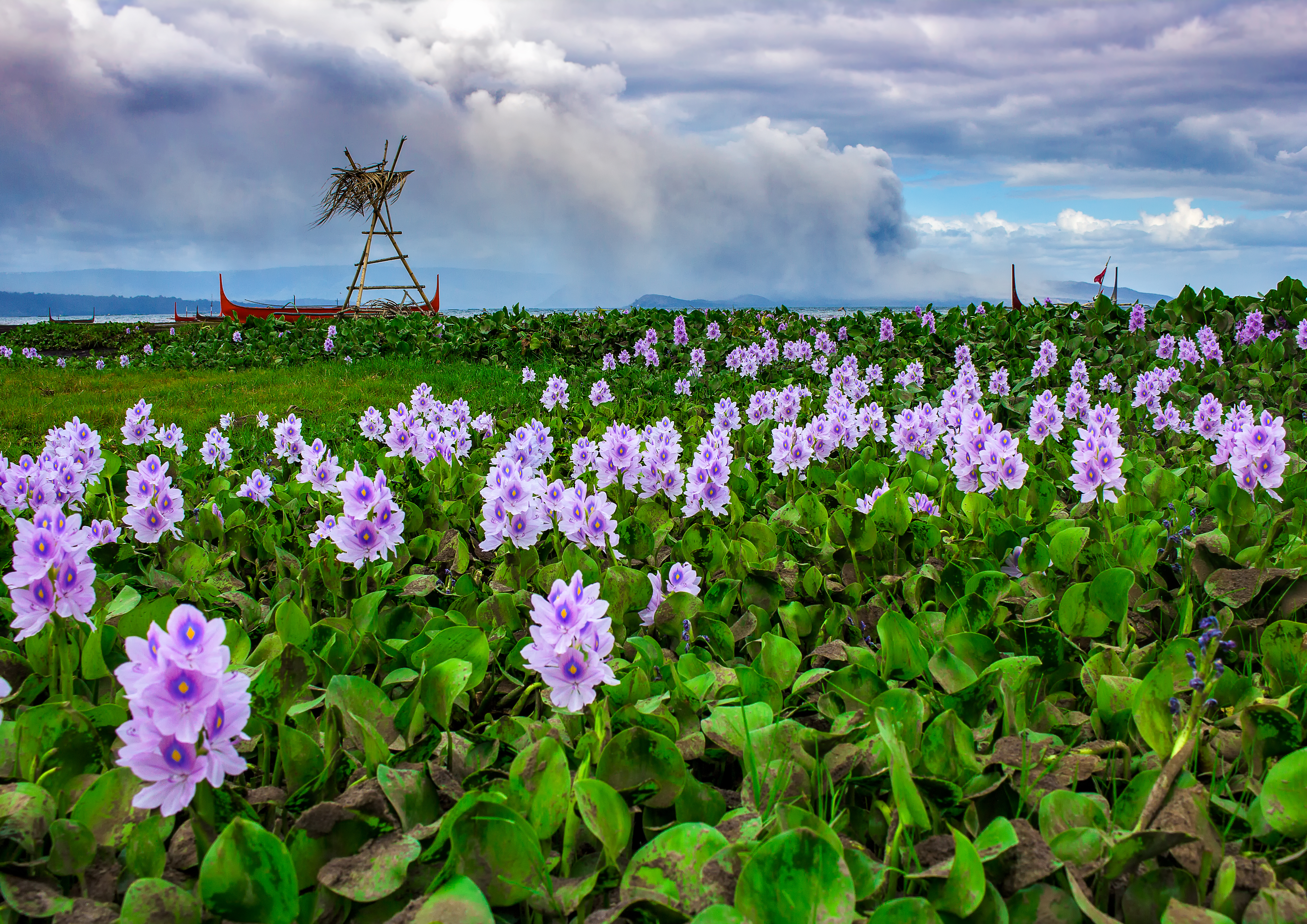
Ash-covered blooming water hyacinth along the lakeshore in San Nicolas, Batangas, Philippines due to the eruption of Taal Volcano in the distance.

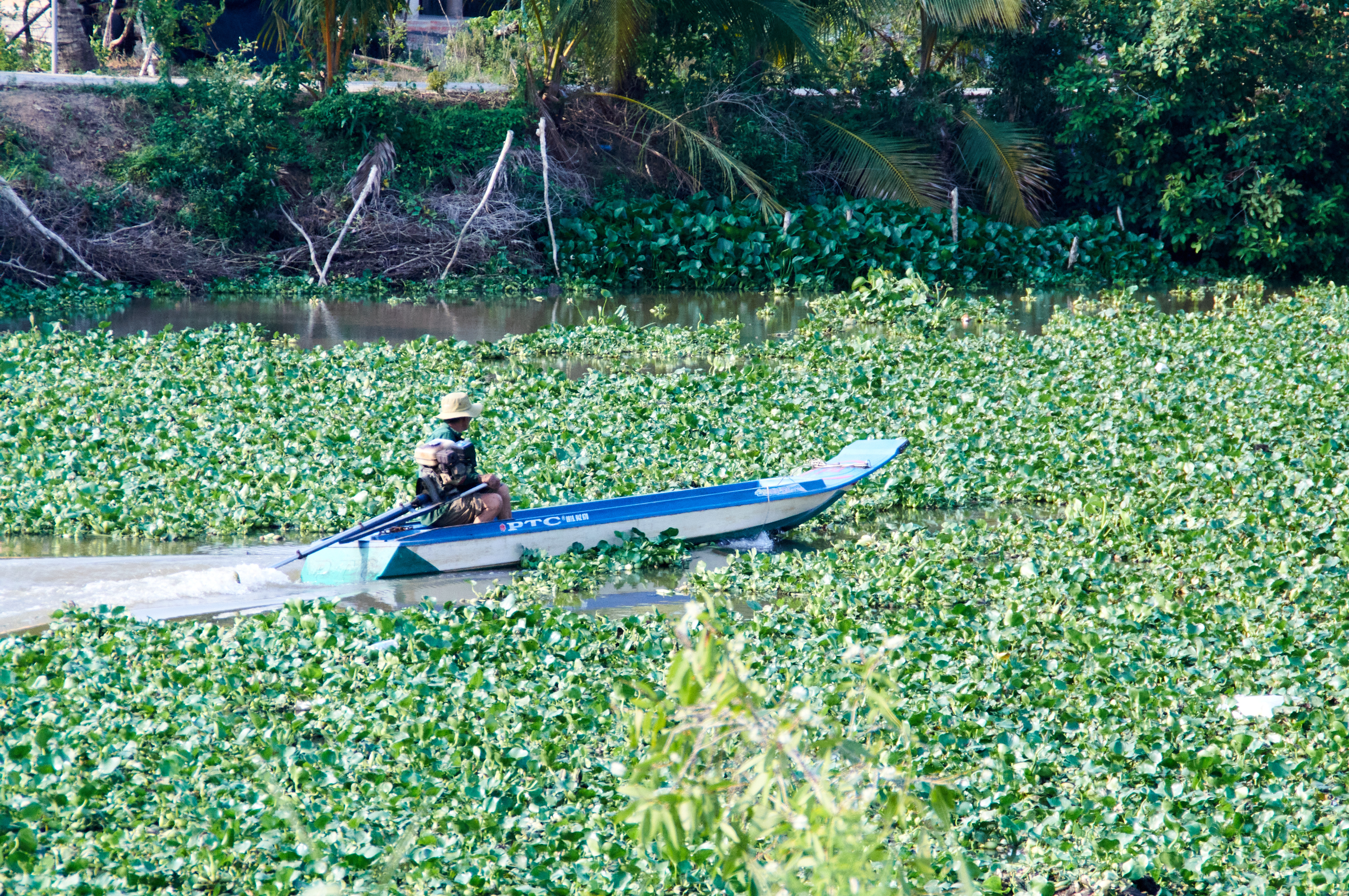
Water hyacinth on a canal in Tien Giang province, Vietnam.

The water hyacinth was introduced to Bengal, because of its ornamental flowers and shapes of leaves, but became an invasive weed, draining oxygen from the water bodies and resulting in devastation of fish stocks. The water hyacinth was referred to as the "(beautiful) blue devil" in Bengal and "Bengal terror" elsewhere in India; it was called "German weed" (Bengali: Germani pana) in Bangladesh out of belief the German Kaiser submarine mission was involved in introducing them at the outbreak of World War I. Concerted efforts were made to eradicate water hyacinths, which affected navigability in Bengal's rivers. The Bengal Water Hyacinth Act, 1936 prohibited the cultivation of the plants. By 1947, the problem was resolved, and navigability was restored to the rivers, although the plants still exist in wetlands. Water hyacinths were called "Japanese trouble" in Sri Lanka because there was a rumor that the British had planted them to entice Japanese aircraft to land on the insecure pads.

The plant entered Japan in 1884 for horticultural appreciation, according to conventional wisdom, but a researcher devoted to the study of the plant has discovered that ukiyo-e artist Utagawa Kunisada (or Utagawa Toyokuni III, d. 1865) produced a wood-block print featuring the water hyacinth, goldfish, and beautiful women, dated to 1855. The plant is floated on the water surface of filled (glassware) fishbowls or glazed earthenware waterlily pots (hibachi pots serving as substitute).

In the 1930s, water hyacinth was introduced into China as a feed, ornamental plant, and sewage-control plant, and it was widely planted in the south as an animal feed. Beginning in the 1980s, with the rapid development of China's inland industry, the eutrophication of inland waters has intensified. With the help of its efficient asexual reproduction and environmental adaptation mechanisms, water hyacinth began to spread widely in river basins. The hyacinths has blocked rivers and hindered water traffic. For example, many waterways in Zhejiang and other provinces have been blocked by the rapidly growing water hyacinth. In addition, a large number of water hyacinths floating in the water block sunlight from entering the water, and its decay consumes dissolved oxygen in the water, pollutes water quality, and can kill other aquatic plants. The outbreak of water hyacinth has seriously affected the biodiversity of the local ecosystem and threatened the production, life, and health of community residents.

=== Europe ===
In 2016, the European Union banned any sales of the water hyacinth in the EU. The species features on the list of invasive alien species of Union concern. This means that not only the sales but also importation, cultivation, or intentional release into the environment are forbidden in the whole of the European Union.

=== Oceania ===
In Papua New Guinea, water hyacinth blocks sunlight to other aquatic organisms, creates habitat for malaria-carrying mosquitoes, clogs waterways to the point that boats cannot get through, and reduces the quality of water for purposes such as cooking, washing, and drinking. People have lost income or even died due to being unable to travel to get food or medical care, or due to diseases from contaminated water or mosquitoes.

== Control ==
Control depends on the specific conditions of each affected location such as the extent of water hyacinth infestation, regional climate, and proximity to human and wildlife.

=== Chemical control ===
Chemical control is the least used of the three controls of water hyacinth, because of its long-term effects on the environment and human health. The use of herbicides requires strict approval from governmental protection agencies and skilled technicians to handle and spray the affected areas. The use of chemical herbicides is only used in case of severe infiltration of water hyacinth. However, the most successful use of herbicides is when it is used for smaller areas of infestation, because in larger areas, more mats of water hyacinths are likely to survive the herbicides and can fragment to further propagate a large area of water hyacinth mats. In addition, it is more cost-effective and less laborious than mechanical control, yet it can lead to environmental effects, as it can penetrate into the ground water system and can affect not only the hydrological cycle within an ecosystem, but also negatively affect the local water system and human health. Also of note, the use of herbicides is not strictly selective of water hyacinths; keystone species and vital organisms such as microalgae can perish from the toxins and can disrupt fragile food webs.

The chemical regulation of water hyacinths can be done using common herbicides such as 2,4-D, glyphosate, and diquat. The herbicides are sprayed on the water hyacinth leaves and leads to direct changes to the physiology of the plant. The use of the herbicide known as 2,4-D leads to the death of water hyacinth through inhibition of cell growth of new tissue and cellular apoptosis. Almost a two-week period may be needed before mats of water hyacinth are destroyed with 2, 4-D. Between 75,000 and 150,000 acres (30,000 and 61,000 ha) of water hyacinth and alligator weed are treated annually in Louisiana.

The herbicide known as diquat is a liquid bromide salt that can rapidly penetrate the leaves of the water hyacinth and lead to immediate inactivity of plant cells and cellular processes. The herbicide glyphosate has a lower toxicity than the other herbicides, so takes longer for the water hyacinth mats to be destroyed (about three weeks). The symptoms include steady wilting of the plants and a yellow discoloration of the plant leaves that eventually leads to plant decay.

=== Physical control ===
Physical control is performed by land-based machines, such as bucket cranes, draglines, or boom, or by water-based machinery such as aquatic weed harvesters, dredges, or vegetation shredder. Mechanical removal is seen as the best short-term solution to the proliferation of the plant.

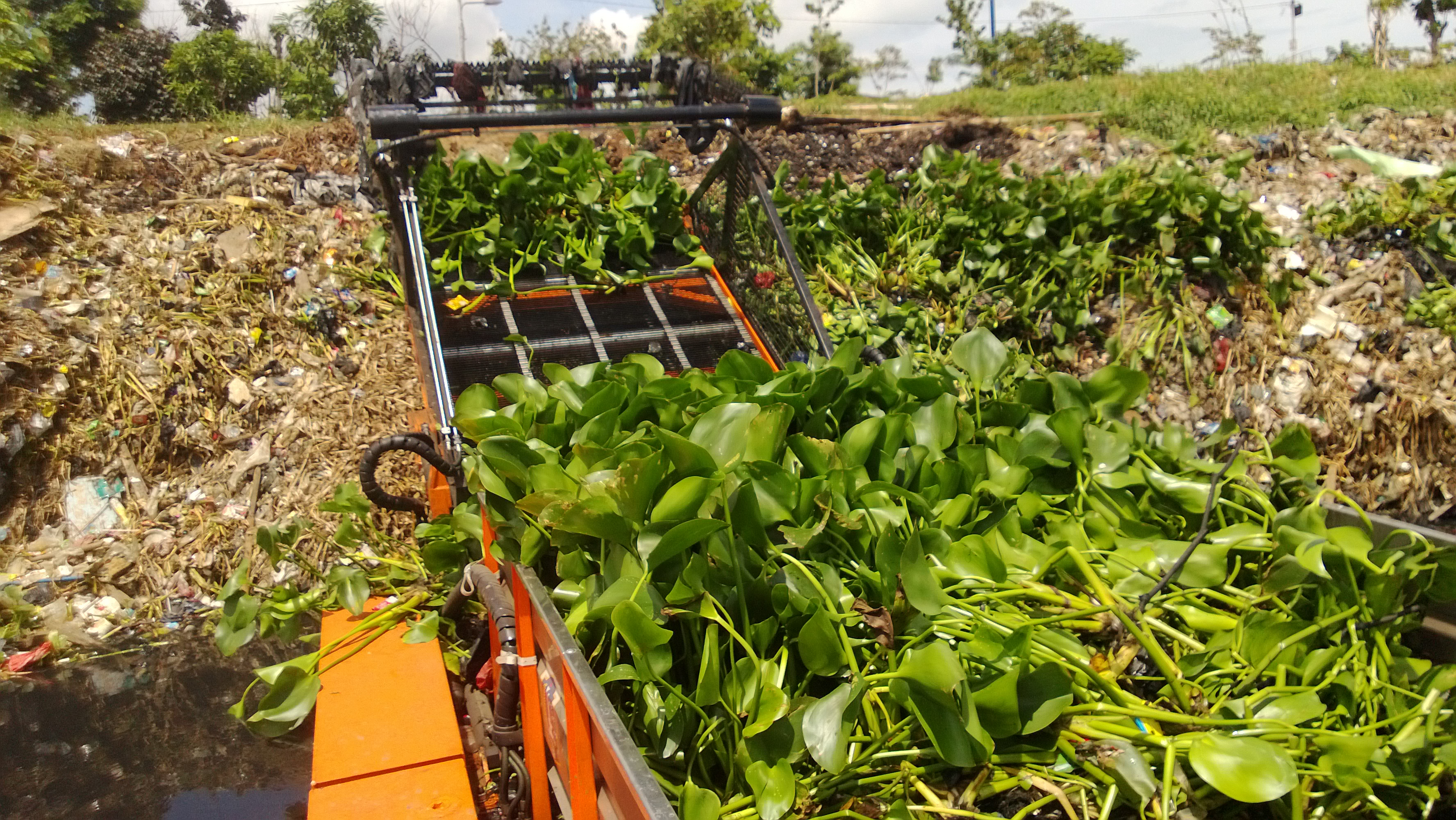
An aquatic weed harvester collects the water plant via conveyor belt on a hold and can unload the material at the shore.

The spinning cutters of plant-harvesting machinery leave fragments of water hyacinth behind that can reproduce asexually.

Harvested water hyacinth can pose a health risk to humans because of the plant's propensity for absorbing contaminants, and it is considered toxic to humans.

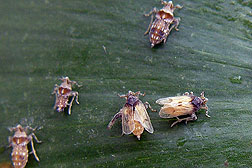
In 2010, the insect Megamelus scutellaris was released by the Agricultural Research Service as a biological control for water hyacinth.

=== Biological control ===
As chemical and mechanical removals are often too expensive, polluting, and ineffective, researchers have turned to biological control agents to deal with water hyacinth. The effort began in the 1970s, when USDA researchers released into the United States three species of weevils known to feed on water hyacinth, Neochetina bruchi, N. eichhorniae, and the water hyacinth borer Sameodes albiguttalis. The weevil species were introduced into the Gulf Coast states, such as Louisiana, Texas, and Florida, where thousands of acres were infested by water hyacinth. A decade later, a decrease was found in water hyacinth mats by as much as 33%, but because the lifecycle of the weevils is 90 days, the use of biological predation to efficiently suppress water hyacinth growth is limited. These organisms regulate water hyacinth by limiting its size, vegetative propagation, and seed production. They also carry microorganisms that can be pathological to the water hyacinth. These weevils eat stem tissue, which results in a loss of buoyancy for the plant, which will eventually sink. Although meeting with only partial success, the weevils have since been released in many other countries. However, the most effective control method remains the control of excessive nutrients and prevention of the spread of this species.

In May 2010, the USDA's Agricultural Research Service released Megamelus scutellaris as an additional biological control insect for the invasive water hyacinth species. M. scutellaris is a small planthopper insect native to Argentina. Researchers have been studying the effects of the biological control agent in extensive host-range studies since 2006 and concluded that the insect is highly host-specific and will not pose a threat to any other plant population other than the targeted water hyacinth. Researchers also hope that this biological control will be more resilient than existing biological controls and the herbicides that are already in place to combat the invasive water hyacinth. Another insect being considered as a biological control agent is the semiaquatic grasshopper Cornops aquaticum. This insect is specific to the water hyacinth and its family, and besides feeding on the plant, it introduces a secondary pathogenic infestation. This grasshopper has been introduced into South Africa in controlled trials.

The Rhodes University Centre for Biological Control is rearing M. scutellaris and the water hyacinth weevils N. eichhorniae and N. bruchi en masse for biological control at dams in South Africa, including the Hartbeespoort Dam. The moth Niphograpta albiguttalis (Warren) (Lepidoptera: Pyralidae) has been introduced to North America, Africa, and Australia. Larvae of this moth bore in the stems and flower buds of water hyacinth.

== Uses ==
=== Bioenergy ===
Due to its high growth rate, Pontederia crassipes is an excellent source of biomass. One hectare (2.5 acres) of standing crop produces more than 70,000 m^{3}/ha (1,000,000 ft^{3}/acre) of biogas (70% CH_{4}, 30% CO_{2}). According to Curtis and Duke, one kg (2.2 lb) of dry matter can yield 370 litres (13 ft^{3}) of biogas, giving a heating value of 22,000 kJ/m^{3} (590 Btu/ft^{3}) compared to pure methane (895 Btu/ft^{3})

Wolverton and McDonald report approximately 0.2 m^{3}/kg (3 ft^{3}/lb) methane, (Note: i.e., 200 liters out of the "350 to 411 liters of biogas per kg dry weight of water hyacinths (5.7 to 6.6 scf per dry lb)" reported by this team with Barlow.) indicating biomass requirements of 350 t/ha (160 short ton/acre) to attain the 70,000 m^{3}/ha (1,000,000 ft^{3}/acre) yield projected by the National Academy of Sciences (Washington). Ueki and Kobayashi mention more than 200 t/ha (90 short ton/acre) per year. Reddy and Tucker found an experimental maximum of more than 1/2 tonne per hectare (1/4 short ton/acre) per day.

Bengali farmers collect and pile up these plants to dry at the onset of the cold season; they then use the dry water hyacinths as fuel. The ashes are used as fertilizer. In India, one tonne (1.1 short tons) of dried water hyacinth yields about 50 liters ethanol and 200 kg residual fiber (7,700 Btu). Bacterial fermentation of one tonne (1.1 short tons) yields 26,500 ft^{3} gas (600 Btu) with 51.6% methane (CH_{4}), 25.4% hydrogen (H_{2}), 22.1% carbon dioxide (CO_{2}), and 1.2% oxygen (O_{2}). Gasification of one tonne (1.1 short tons) dry matter by air and steam at high temperatures (800 °C or 1,500 °F) gives about 40,000 ft^{3} (1,100 m^{3}) natural gas (143 Btu/ft^{3}) containing 16.6% H_{2}, 4.8% CH_{4}, 21.7% CO (carbon monoxide), 4.1% CO_{2}, and 52.8% N_{2} (nitrogen). The high moisture content of water hyacinth adds to handling costs and limits commercial use. A continuous, hydroponic production system would be more efficient than conventional batch operation.

The labor involved in harvesting water hyacinth can be reduced by locating collection sites and processors on impoundments that take advantage of prevailing winds. The harvested biomass can be converted to ethanol, biogas, hydrogen, gaseous nitrogen, and/or fertilizer. The byproduct water can be used to irrigate nearby cropland.

=== Phytoremediation, waste water treatment ===
Water hyacinth could be used to remove arsenic from contaminated tube well water in Bangladesh.

Water hyacinth is observed to enhance nitrification in wastewater treatment cells. The root zones host bacterial communities.

Water hyacinth is a common fodder plant in the third world especially Africa though excessive use can be toxic. It is high in protein (nitrogen) and trace minerals.

Water hyacinth is reported for its efficiency to remove about 60–80% nitrogen. and about 69% of potassium from water. The roots of water hyacinth were found to remove particulate matter and nitrogen in a natural shallow eutrophicated wetland.

The plant is tolerant of, and has a high capacity for, the uptake of heavy metals, including cadmium, chromium, cobalt, nickel, lead, and mercury, which could make it suitable for the biocleaning of industrial wastewater.

The roots of Pontederia crassipes naturally absorb some organic compounds believed to be carcinogenic, in concentrations 10,000 times that in the surrounding water. Water hyacinths can be cultivated for waste water treatment (especially dairy waste water).

In addition to heavy metals, Pontederia crassipes can also remove other toxins, such as cyanide, which is environmentally beneficial in areas that have endured gold-mining operations.

Water hyacinth can take in and degrade ethion, a phosphorus pesticide.

=== Agriculture ===
Water hyacinth is used as an organic fertilizer and as animal feed and silage for cattle, sheep, geese, pigs, and other livestock.

In Bengal, India the kachuri-pana has been used primarily for fertilizer, compost or mulch, and secondarily as fodder for livestock and fish. In Bangladesh, farmers in the southwestern region cultivate vegetables on "floating gardens" usually with a bamboo-built frame base, with dried mass of water hyacinth covered in soil as bedding as a large portion of cultivable land goes under water for months during monsoon in this low-lying region. This method is also known as dhap chash and vasoman chash.

In Kenya, East Africa, it has been used experimentally as organic fertilizer, although there is controversy stemming from the high alkaline pH value.

=== Other uses ===
In various places in the world, the plant is used for making furniture, handbags, baskets, rope, and household goods/interior products (lampshades, picture frames) by businesses launched by NGOs and entrepreneurs.

==== Woven products ====
American-Nigerian Achenyo Idachaba has won an award for showing how this plant can be exploited for profit as woven products in Nigeria.

==== Paper ====
Though a study found water hyacinths of limited use for paper production, they are nonetheless used on a small scale. Goswami pointed out in his article that water hyacinth has the potential to make tough and strong paper. He found that adding water hyacinth pulp to the raw material of bamboo pulp for anti-grease paper can increase the physical strength of paper.

==== Edibility ====
The plant is used as a carotene-rich table vegetable in Taiwan. Javanese sometimes cook and eat the green parts and inflorescence. Vietnamese also cook the plant and sometimes add its young leaves and flower to their salads.

==== Potential as bioherbicidal agent ====
Water hyacinth leaf extract has been shown to exhibit phytotoxicity against another invasive weed Mimosa pigra. The extract inhibited the germination of M. pigra seeds in addition to suppressing the root growth of the seedlings. Biochemical data suggested that the inhibitory effects may be mediated by enhanced hydrogen peroxide production, inhibition of soluble peroxidase activity, and stimulation of cell wall-bound peroxidase activity in the root tissues of M. pigra.

==== Bioplastics ====
In Kenya, biodegradable plastics developed from dried water hyacinths are commercialized as food wrappers, straws, and party plates.

== Gallery ==
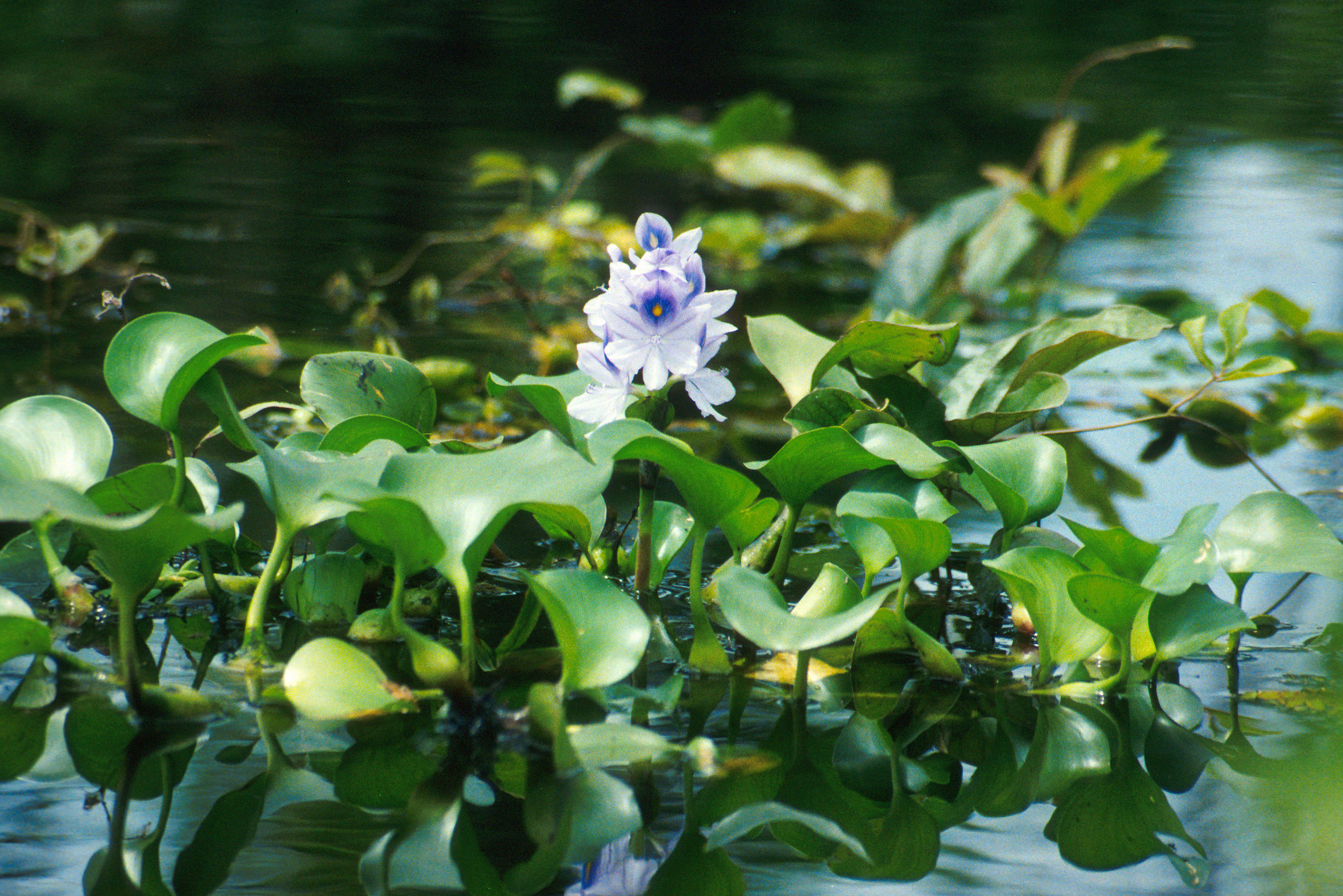

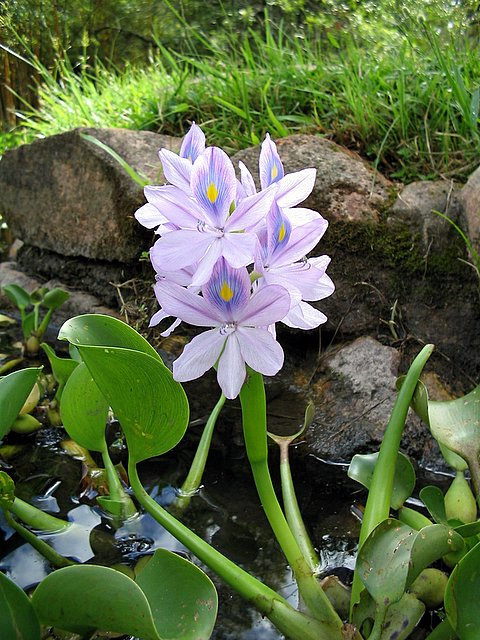

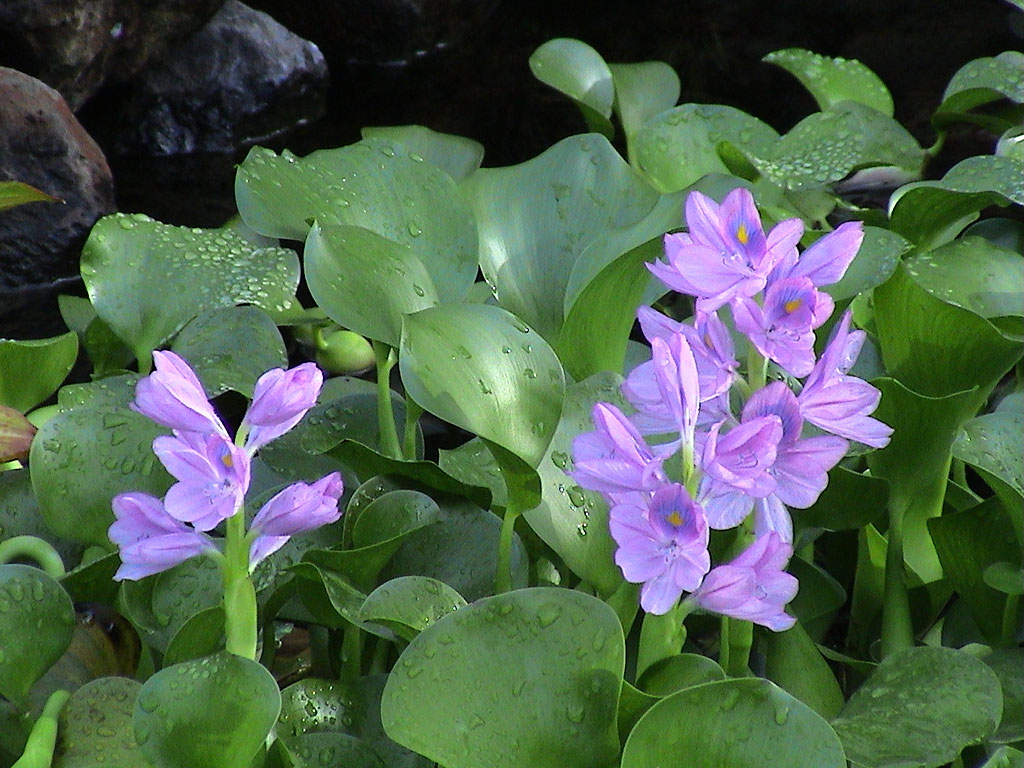

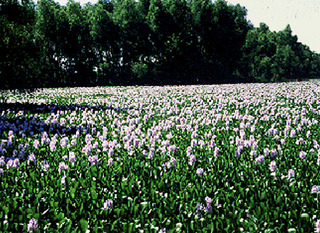

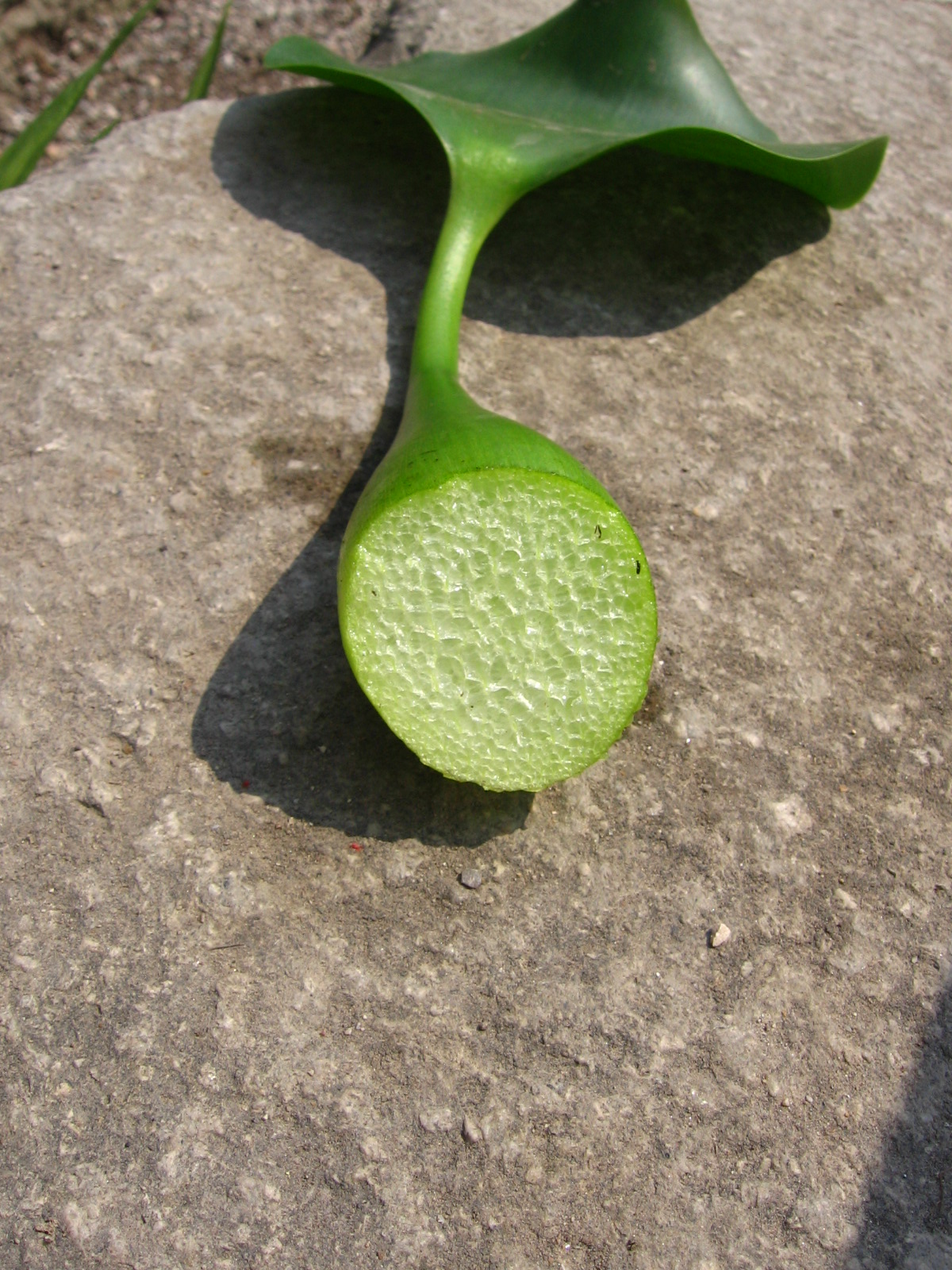
Inflated petiole

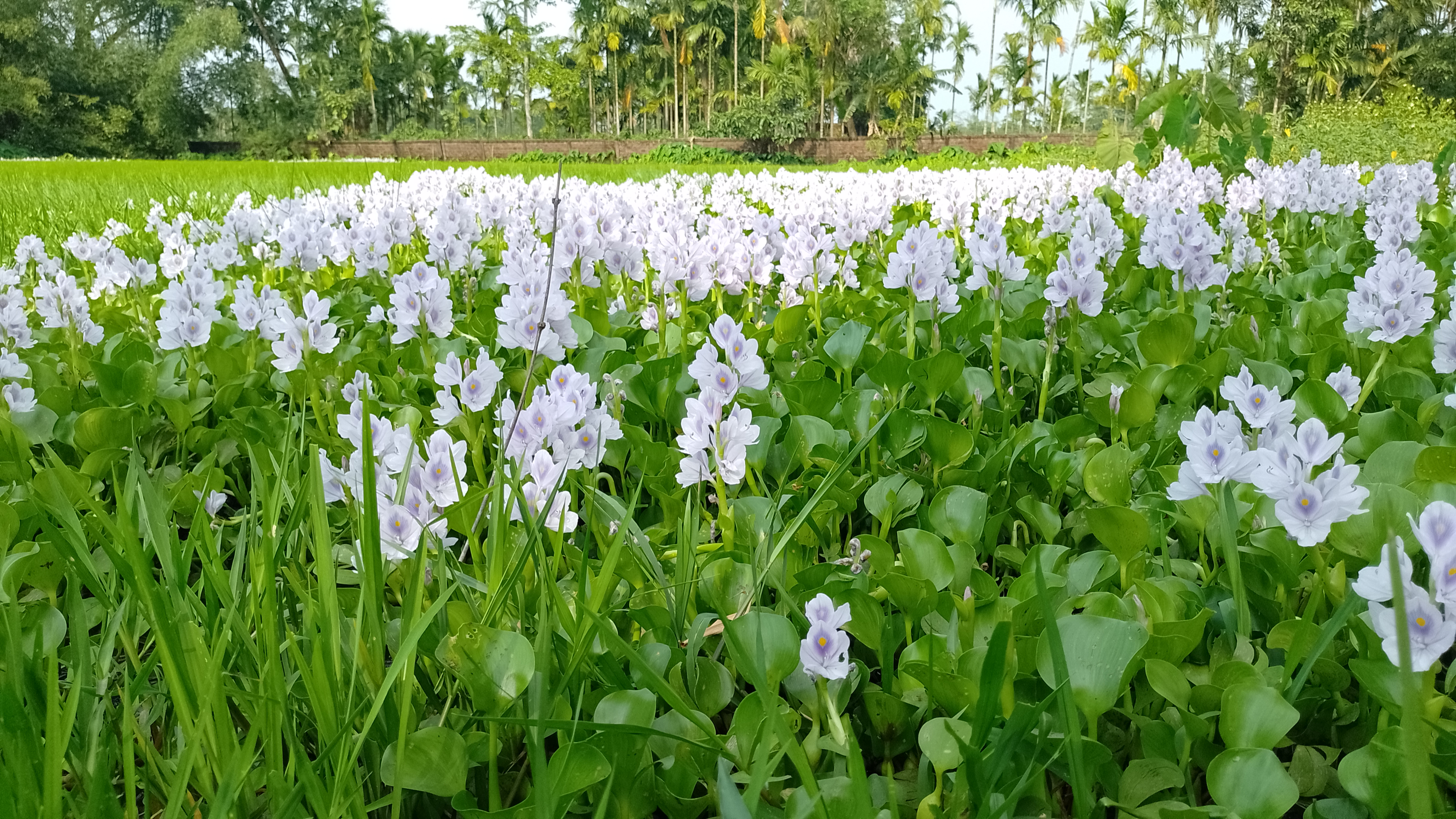
A field full of Water hyacinth.

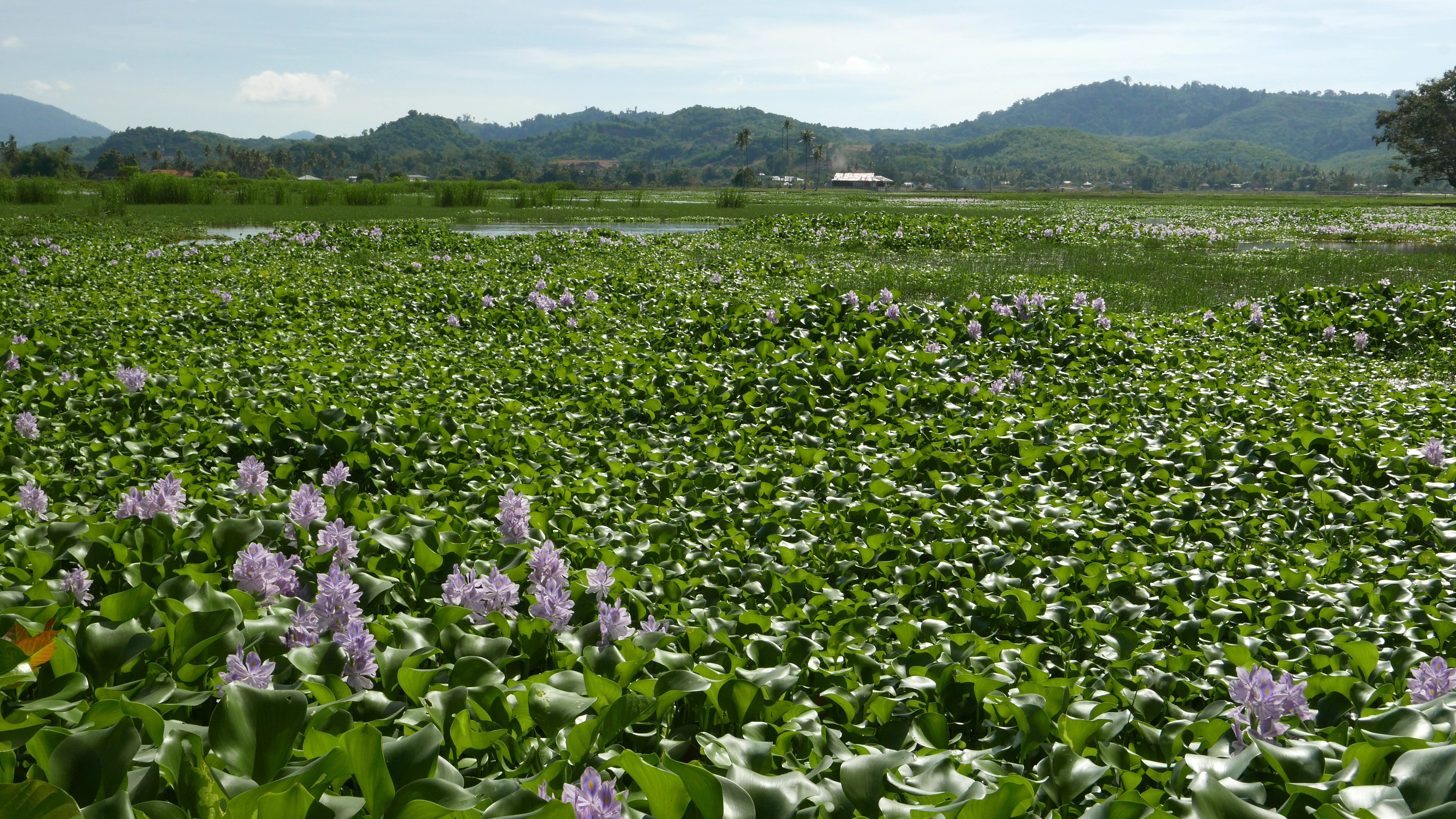
Huge swamp field
