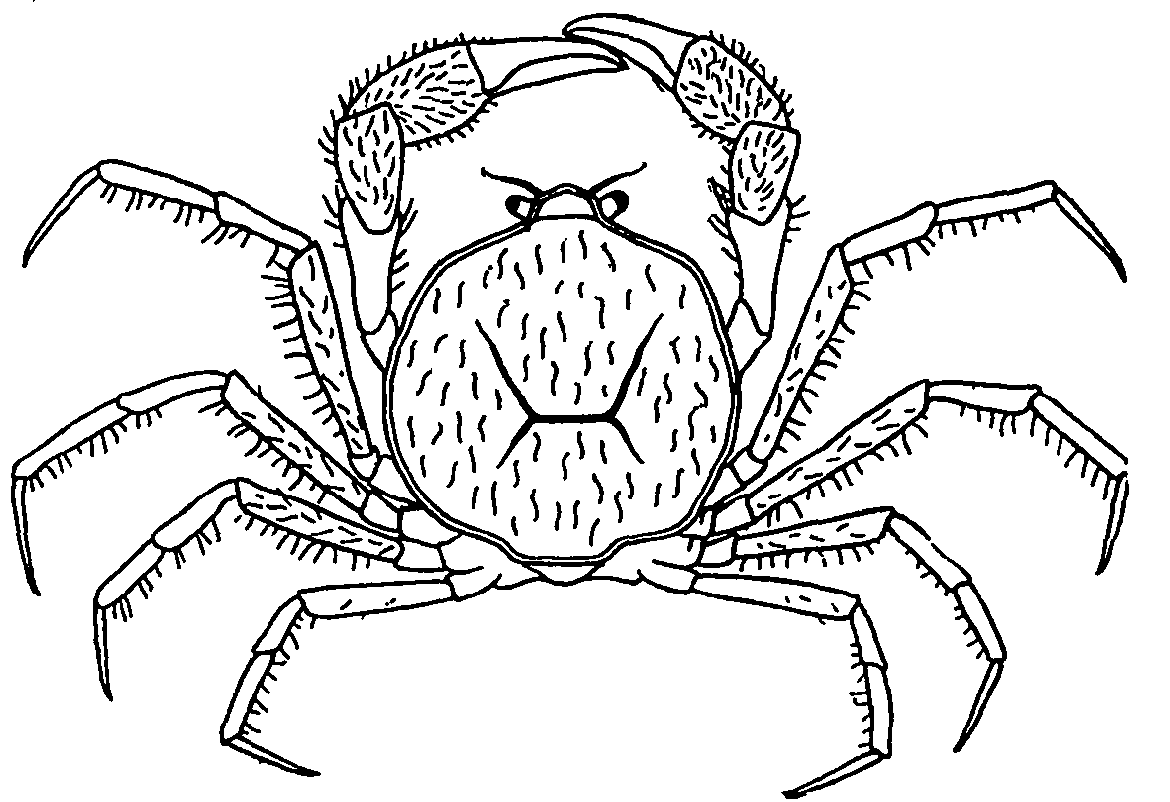
- Amarinus lacustris

Scientific classification
- Kingdom: Animalia
- Phylum: Arthropoda
- Clade: Pancrustacea
- Class: Malacostraca
- Order: Decapoda
- Suborder: Pleocyemata
- Infraorder: Brachyura
- Subsection: Heterotremata
- Superfamily: Hymenosomatoidea
- Family: Hymenosomatidae; Macleay, 1838

Genera
- See text

= Hymenosomatidae =

Family of crabs

Hymenosomatidae is a family of crabs with some 110 described species in 24 genera. The following genera are placed in the Hymenosomatidae:

- Amarinus
- Apechocinus
- Cancrocaeca
- Crustaenia
- Culexisoma
- Elamena
- Elamenopsis
- Guaplax
- Halicarcinides
- Halicarcinus
- Halimena
- Hymenicoides
- Hymenosoma
- Limnopilos
- Lucascinus
- Micas
- Neohymenicus
- Neorhynchoplax
- Nasutoplax
- Odiomaris
- Rhynchoplax
- Stimpsoplax
- Sulaplax
- Trigonoplax
