= The Elephant Sanctuary Hartbeespoort Dam =

Coordinates: 25°43′17.82″S 27°48′26.98″E

- Interactive map of The Elephant Sanctuary Hartbeespoort Dam
- Location: Magaliesberg Mountains in the North West Province of South Africa

The Elephant Sanctuary is situated close to Hartbeespoort Dam in the North West Province South Africa

The Elephant Sanctuary Hartbeespoort Dam is an elephant sanctuary providing a safe haven and "halfway house" for African elephants. It provides fully guided interactive educational programs covering elephant habits, dynamics, behavior and anatomy. The main focus of the sanctuary is to educate visitors about all aspects of elephants and elephant husbandry, with the vision to release elephants into an environment where they can be more independent. Visitors have the opportunity to touch, feed, walk trunk-in-hand with experienced guides.

The sanctuary is situated in indigenous bushveld in the Magaliesberg Mountains in the North West Province of South Africa, 45 km from Johannesburg, 35 km from Pretoria. It is open to the public seven days a week year-round.

== The Elephant Sanctuary Group ==
The Elephant Sanctuary Group has three operations – at Hartbeespoort Dam near Pretoria, in Plettenberg Bay on the Garden Route, and in Hazyview near the Kruger Park.

== Elephant educational programs ==
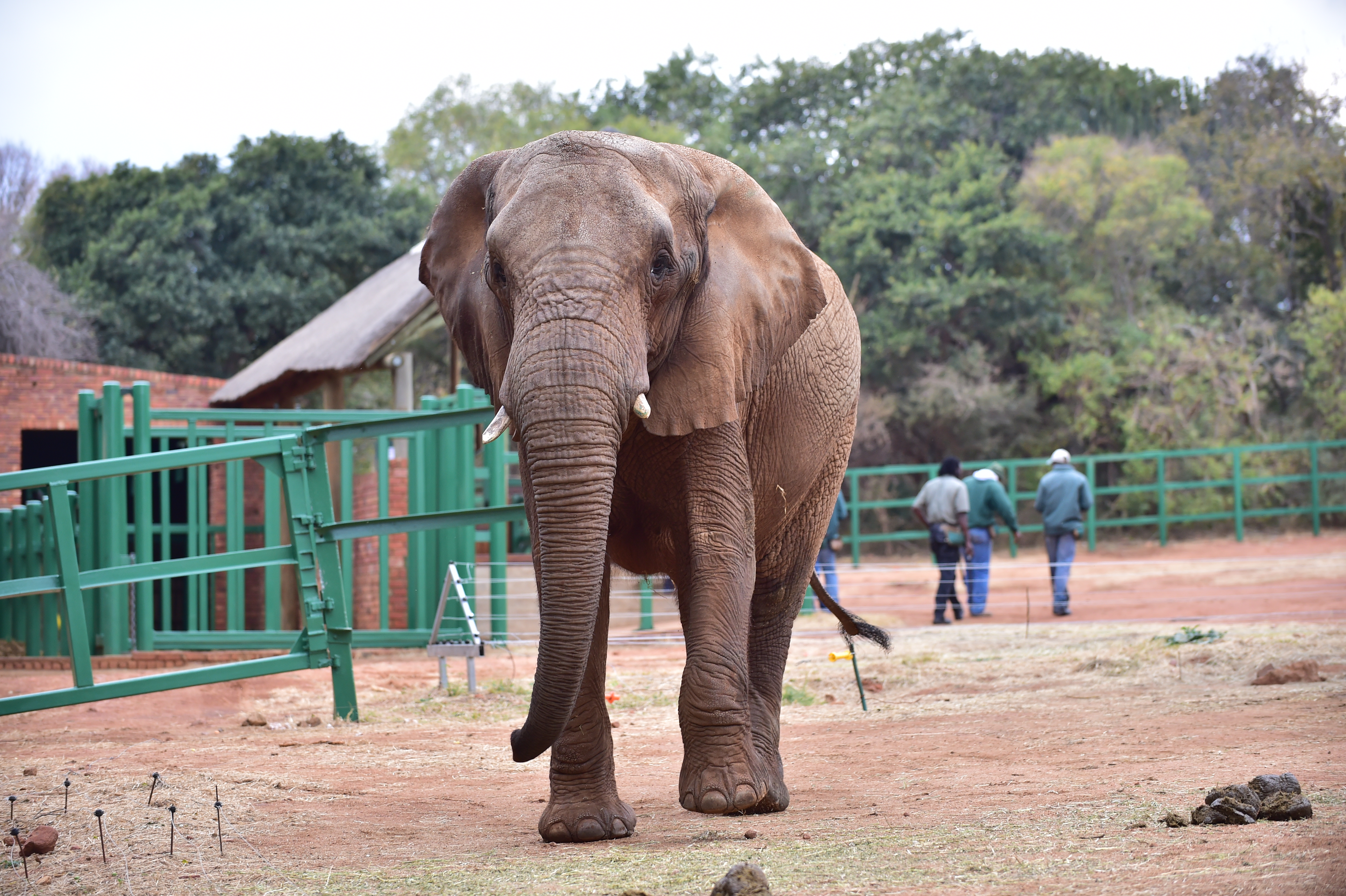

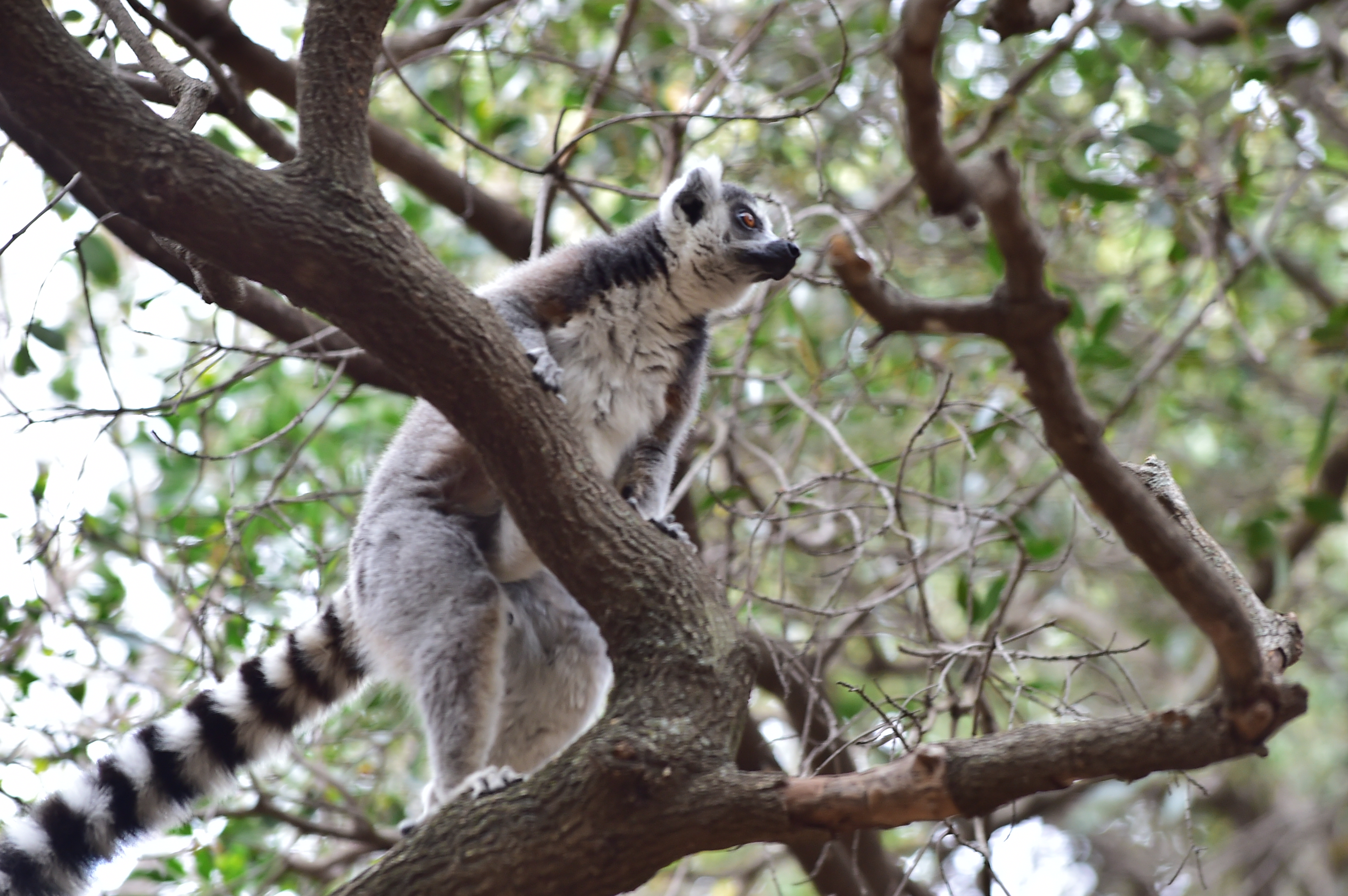
A bush elephant and ring-tailed lemur at the sanctuary

Morning afternoon and evening elephant educational programs entail up-close and personal interaction, feeding, brushing and grooming, walking trunk-in-hand, and include information and insight into African elephants anatomy, habits and personalities, as well as elephant husbandry and the keeping of elephants in captivity.

Programs run three times per day year round and last between 1.5 hours and 2 hours.

== Overnight experience ==
The Elephant Sanctuary offers an overnight elephant experience with accommodation in an Indo-African style lodge.

== Elephant care ==
Elephant Sanctuary staff work with the resident African elephants to ensure their well-being and welfare. The elephants are exercised and stimulated daily and training provides emotional and mental stimulation. The reward system utilised is based on trust and positive reinforcement and forms bonds between humans and elephants.

The Elephant Sanctuary Group abides to the standards of animal husbandry, veterinary care and housing, and the principles of the five freedoms of animal welfare prescribed by the African Association of Zoos and Aquaria Code of Ethics.

== See also ==
- Hartbeespoort
- Hartbeespoort Dam
