= Bushbabies Monkey Sanctuary =

Primate rehabilitation centre in South Africa

- Bushbabies Monkey Sanctuary is situated close to Hartbeespoort Dam in the North West Province South Africa

- Location within South Africa
- Coordinates: 25°43′11″S 27°48′54″E

Bushbabies Monkey Sanctuary is a privately owned multi-species primate rehabilitation centre situated in the foothills and gorges of the Magaliesberg mountain range, close to Hartbeespoort Dam in the North West Province of South Africa.

The sanctuary takes in donated and rescued primates that may have been orphaned, raised as household pets, previously confined to captivity, abused, injured, or recovered from the illegal pet trade.

Primates are rehabilitated for free-release within the natural forested environment of the sanctuary, where they are given a new lease of life in a wild environment and encouraged to search and hunt for food themselves.

The sanctuary is one of only eight free-release primate sanctuaries in the world, and home to over 90 indigenous and exotic primates from around the world. A number of primates have also been born wild at the sanctuary.

The sanctuary is non-subsidised, and supported by funding generated from guided tours and sales of curios.

It is open to the public seven days a week, year round.

== Species ==
Primates species at Bushbabies Monkey Sanctuary include: spider monkeys, lemurs, bush babies, squirrel monkeys, capuchin monkeys and vervet monkeys.

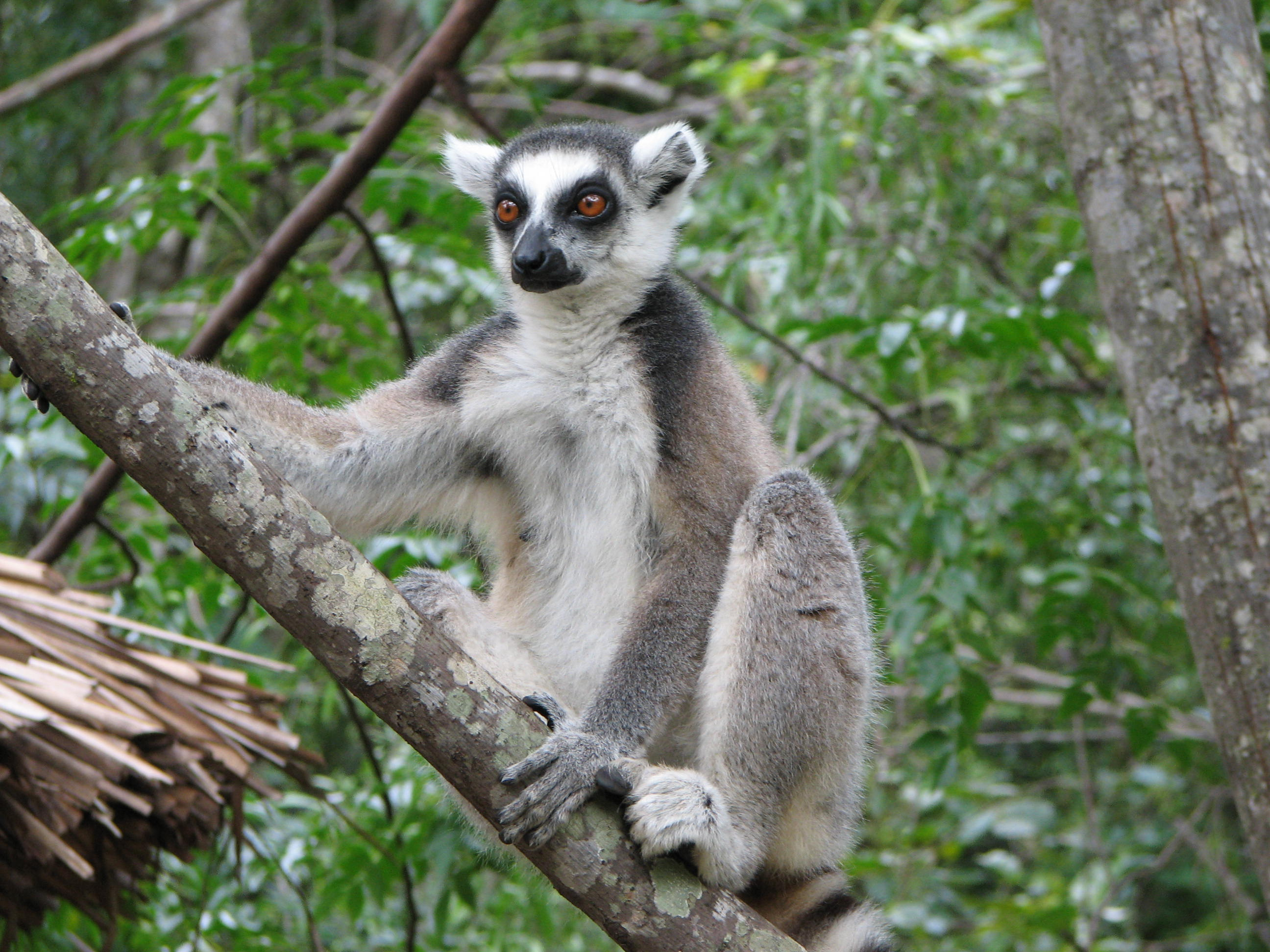
Lemur

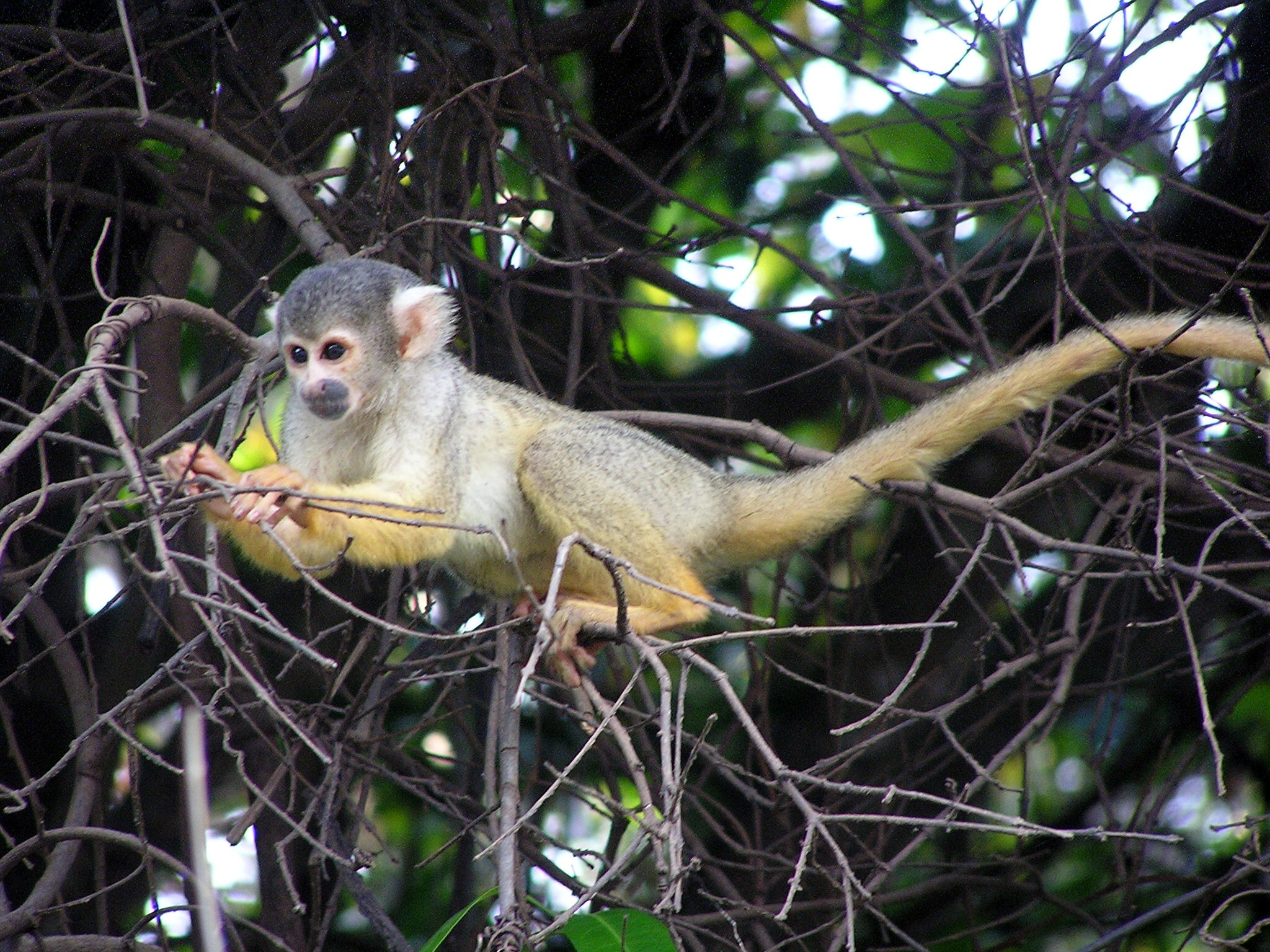
Squirrel monkey

== Educational tours ==
Trained guides conduct educational walking tours along elevated wooden walkways through the indigenous forests and gorges of the sanctuary. Visitors have the opportunity to observe and learn about a variety of primate species in an unobtrusive manner, whilst the animals benefit from a protected, yet wild environment.

The tours are geared towards creating awareness of the fact that primates do not make good pets, and the benefits of releasing primates into recognized sanctuaries.

== See also ==
- Magaliesberg
- Hartbeespoort
- Hartbeespoort Dam
