= Kosmos, South Africa =

Kosmos
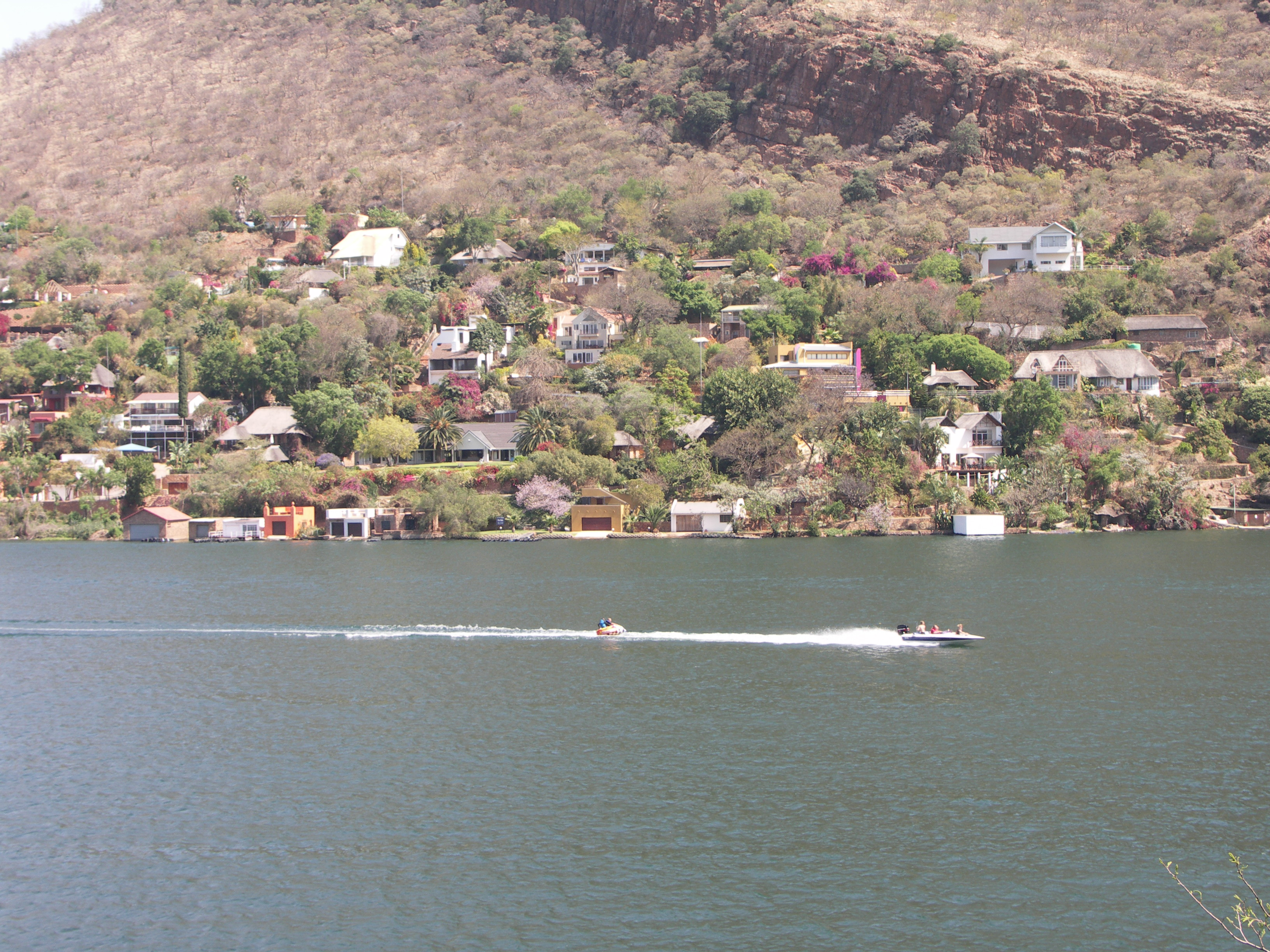
- Kosmos seen from Hartbeespoort

- Location within North West (South African province) Location within South Africa
- Coordinates: 25°44′14″S 27°51′13″E
- Country: South Africa
- Province: North West
- District: Bojanala Platinum
- Municipality: Madibeng

Area
  - Total: 0.91 km^{2} (0.35 sq mi)

Population (2011)
  - Total: 528
  - Density: 580/km^{2} (1,500/sq mi)

Racial makeup (2011)
  - Black African: 30.1%
  - Coloured: 0.8%
  - White: 68.4%
  - Other: 0.8%

First languages (2011)
  - Afrikaans: 43.5%
  - Tswana: 42.0%
  - English: 5.0%
  - Zulu: 1.9%
  - Other: 7.5%
- Time zone: UTC+2 (SAST)
- PO box: 0261

Kosmos is a village in the North West Province of South Africa. It is situated on the western bank of the Hartbeespoort Dam.

== History ==
The first homes were built in the 1920s shortly after the Dam was constructed. It is thought that the name derives from the Kosmos which grows wild in great drifts in many parts of the Highveld, and in particular on the roads from the nearby major cities. More homes followed over the years, and the style moved steadily up market. Little development of commercial enterprises ever took place, although it is said that in earlier years the 'Sail Inn' on the waterfront was a favourite watering hole. Many Anglo–Boer War battles ranged around the area and the British built one of the blockhouses on the crest of the range above the village, in view of its strategic position.

In more recent years a restaurant immediately outside the original township, Stywe Lyne, (Tight Lines in Afrikaans) was a favourite destination for motorbike enthusiasts to gather on Sundays, and show off their bikes. This too has given way to the pressures of upmarket residential development.

== Modern day Kosmos ==
The village has only one access road, and perhaps as a result has developed a strong sense of community. The residents fund an illegal security gate which maintains the access gate to 'Kosmos Proper', a reference to that area lying within the boundaries of the original township. The gate is designed to stop the public from accessing Kosmos freely, something that is illegal in South Africa. On the higher slopes of the village there is a Community Centre and Library, on municipal land. Next to it is a Garden Chapel, where non-denominational religious services are conducted regularly by the residents. On the waterfront near the entrance the residents have developed the Kosmos Marina Club. There are Post Boxes but no Post Office, and no shops or other commercial enterprises. Recently a number of Bed and Breakfast establishments have started up, with local accommodation bookings and tourism logistics supported by digital platforms including Visit Hartbees.

Outside Kosmos Proper, on the short road leading to the village, several resort and residential estates have been developed and new ones are being built. One of these has a nine-hole golf course, which skirts the waters of the dam in a challenging manner.

In amongst these estates lies Orange Farm, an 'informal settlement' (which elsewhere might be termed a 'squatter camp' or 'shanty town'). In these shacks, with no proper supplies of electricity, water or sanitation, live hundreds of people who depend for their meagre livelihood on work as servants and jobs with building and construction companies. Efforts to relocate them to other locations further away with proper amenities have been unsuccessful.

== Geology ==
At this point the Magaliesberg range is displaced about 1 kilometre south by faulting and erosion. Kosmos lies on the south, steep side of the monocline, and at its north eastern end, where the Crocodile River passes through the Dam, the cliffs become too steep to allow buildings or a road.
