= Hartbeespoort Aerial Cableway =

Cableway in North West Province, South Africa

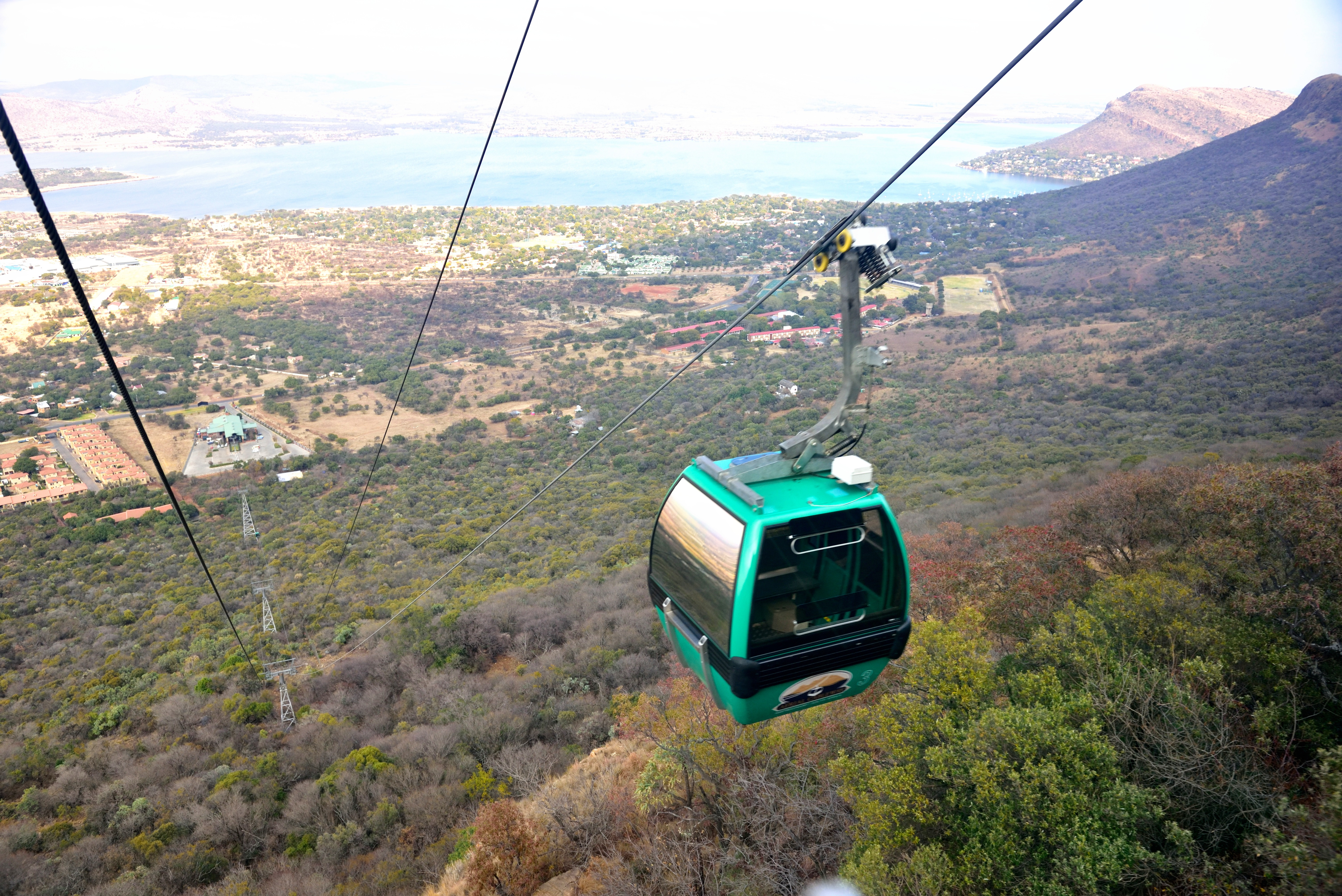
- The Harties Aerial Cableway is located at Hartbeespoort in the North West Province, South Africa
- Location within North West (South African province) Location within South Africa

Overview
- Status: Operational
- Country: South Africa
- Coordinates: 25°42′40.61″S 27°53′8.44″E
- Elevation: lowest: 0 metres (0 ft) highest: 1,592 metres (5,223 ft)
- No. of stations: 2
- Open: 1973; 53 years ago
- Website: Harties Cableway

Operation
- Operator: Zargodox (Pty) Ltd
- Carrier capacity: 6 passengers per cabin; 2 passengers per two-seater chair lift

Technical features
- Aerial lift type: Mono cableway
- Line length: 1 600 metres

Harties Aerial Cableway Logo

The Hartbeespoort Aerial Cableway (or Harties Cableway), originally constructed in 1973, is a 1.2 km long cableway that extends to the top of the Magaliesberg and offers panoramic views of the Magaliesberg, Hartbeespoort Dam and the surrounding area. It is situated 1 km to the north of the town of Hartbeespoort in the North West Province, and is the longest mono-cableway in Africa. In 2010 the cableway was completely revamped and modernised by Zargodox (Pty) Ltd, and officially reopened on 14 August 2010 by the then Minister of Tourism Marthinus van Schalkwyk. The aerial cableway is open seven days a week.

== History ==
=== 1973–2005 ===
The first Harties Aerial Cableway was constructed in 1973. The aerial cableway was a top visitor attraction for overseas travellers and local residents, and became a popular paragliding and hang gliding destination. By 2005 the cableway had fallen into a state of disrepair, and was closed.

=== 2010 ===
In 2010, Zargodox (Pty) Ltd began a private initiative with the aim of growing tourism in the Hartbeespoort area, and purchased the old cableway. In collaboration with Swiss company Rowema AG, Zargodox invested time and expertise into rejuvenating the old cableway and bringing the area back to life. 14 six-seater hi-tech cable cars, new galvanised cabling, touch-screen technology, and auto cabin spacing and conveyor programming technology was installed. The cableway underwent 500 hours of testing, complying with the Canadian Standards Association specifications.

=== 2012 ===
The Harties Aerial Cableway was named 'Best Conference Venue' at the North West Provincial Tourism Awards.

== Government recognition ==
In his address at the official launch of the Harties Aerial Cableway on 14 August, Minister of Tourism Marthinus van Schalkwyk congratulated the team behind the rejuvenation of the cableway, and stated "Anyone who has been to Switzerland will tell you that the Harties Cableway is up there with the best. "This is a world-class facility and we need many more products like this."

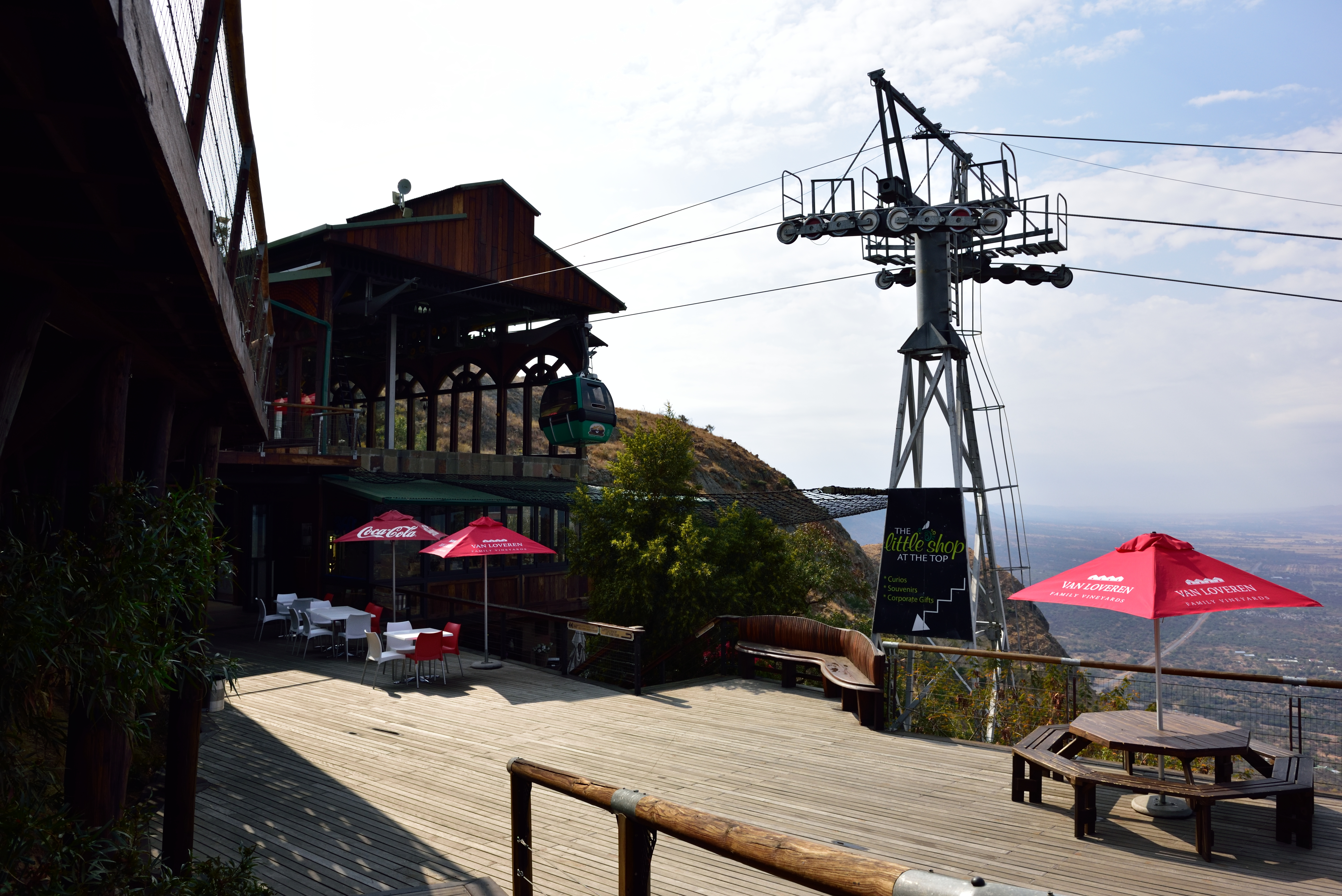
Upper station

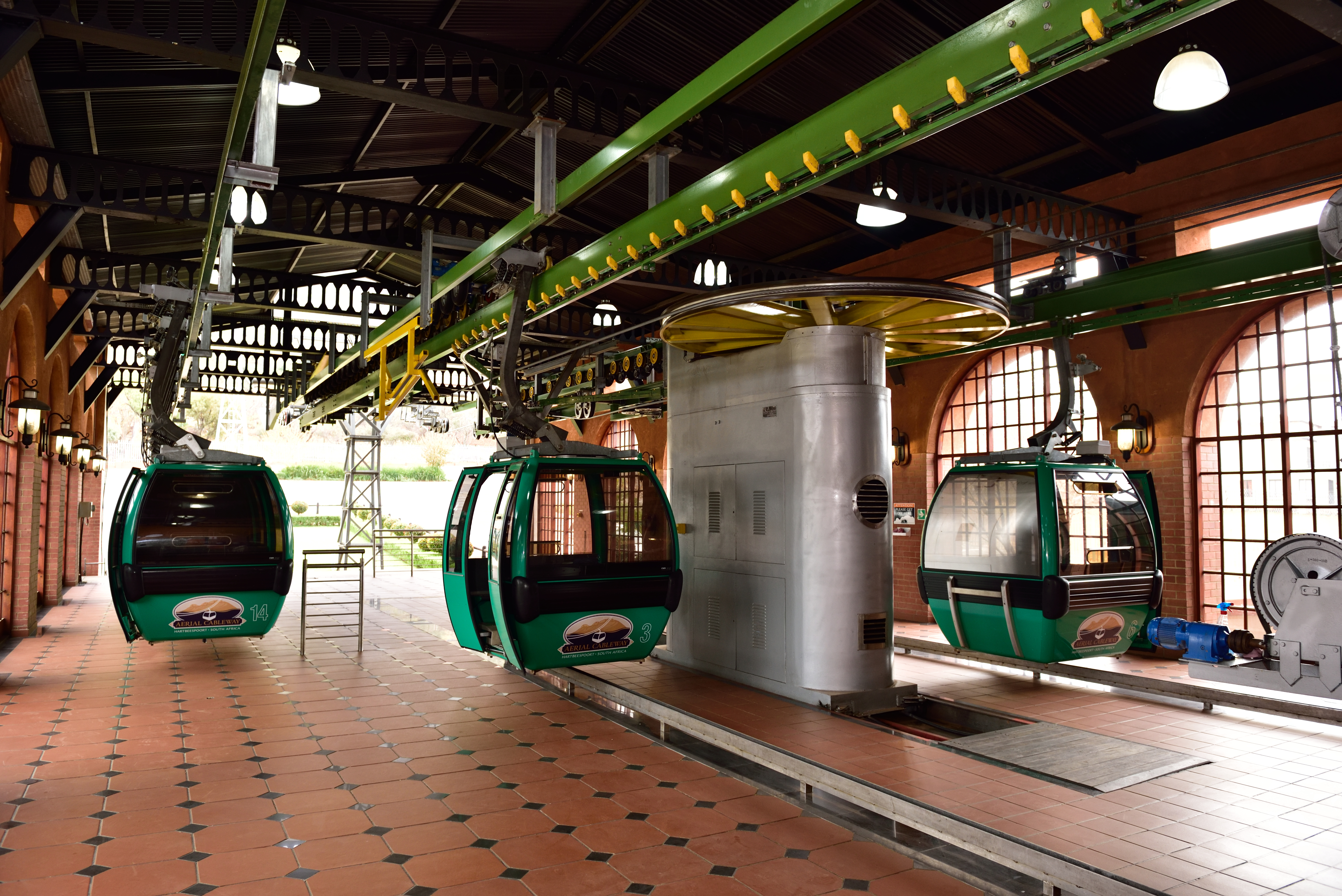
Lower station
