= Hartbeespoort =

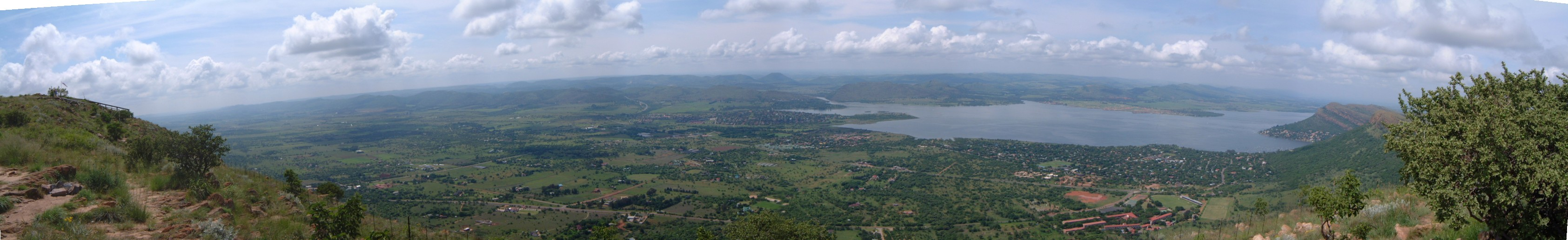
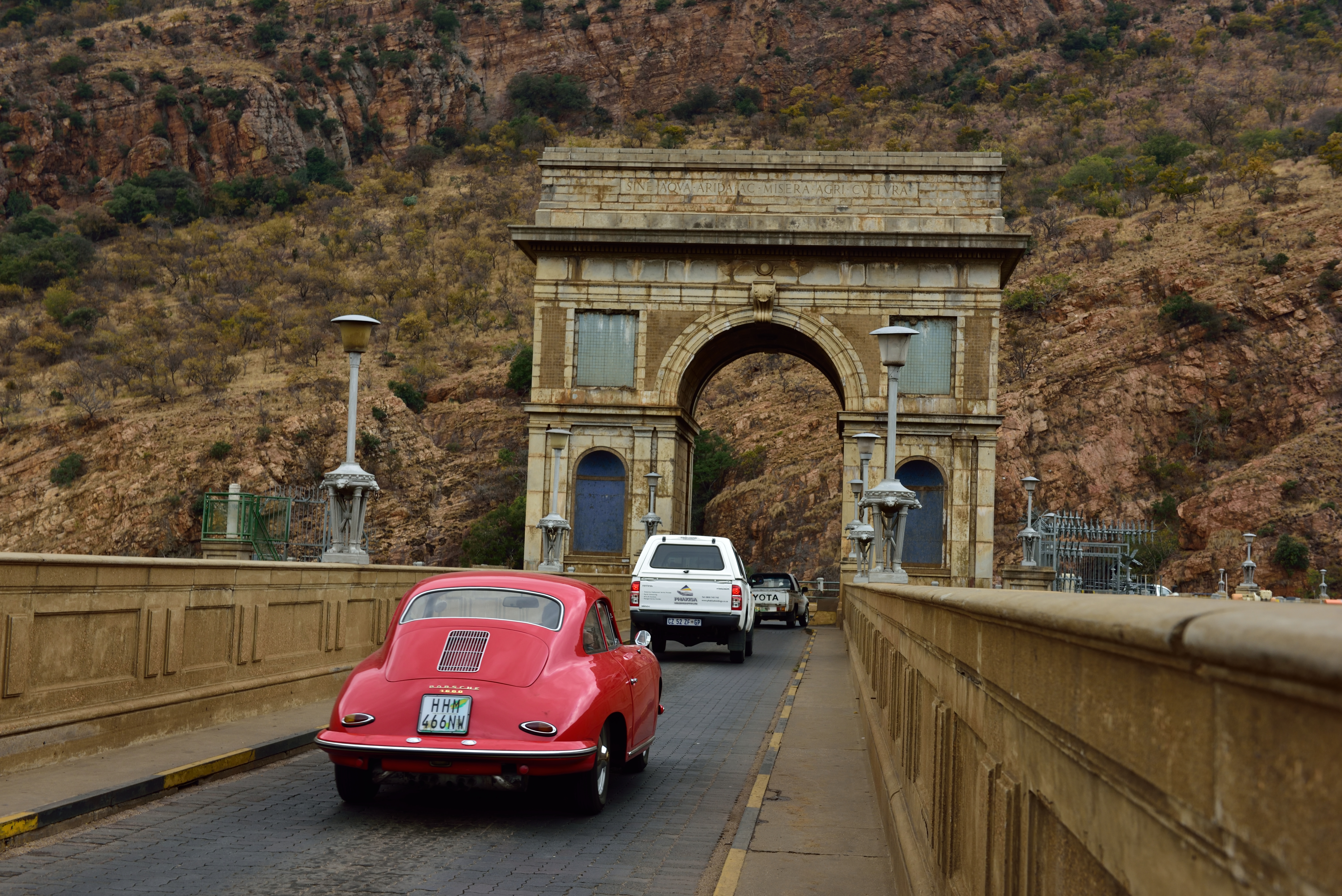
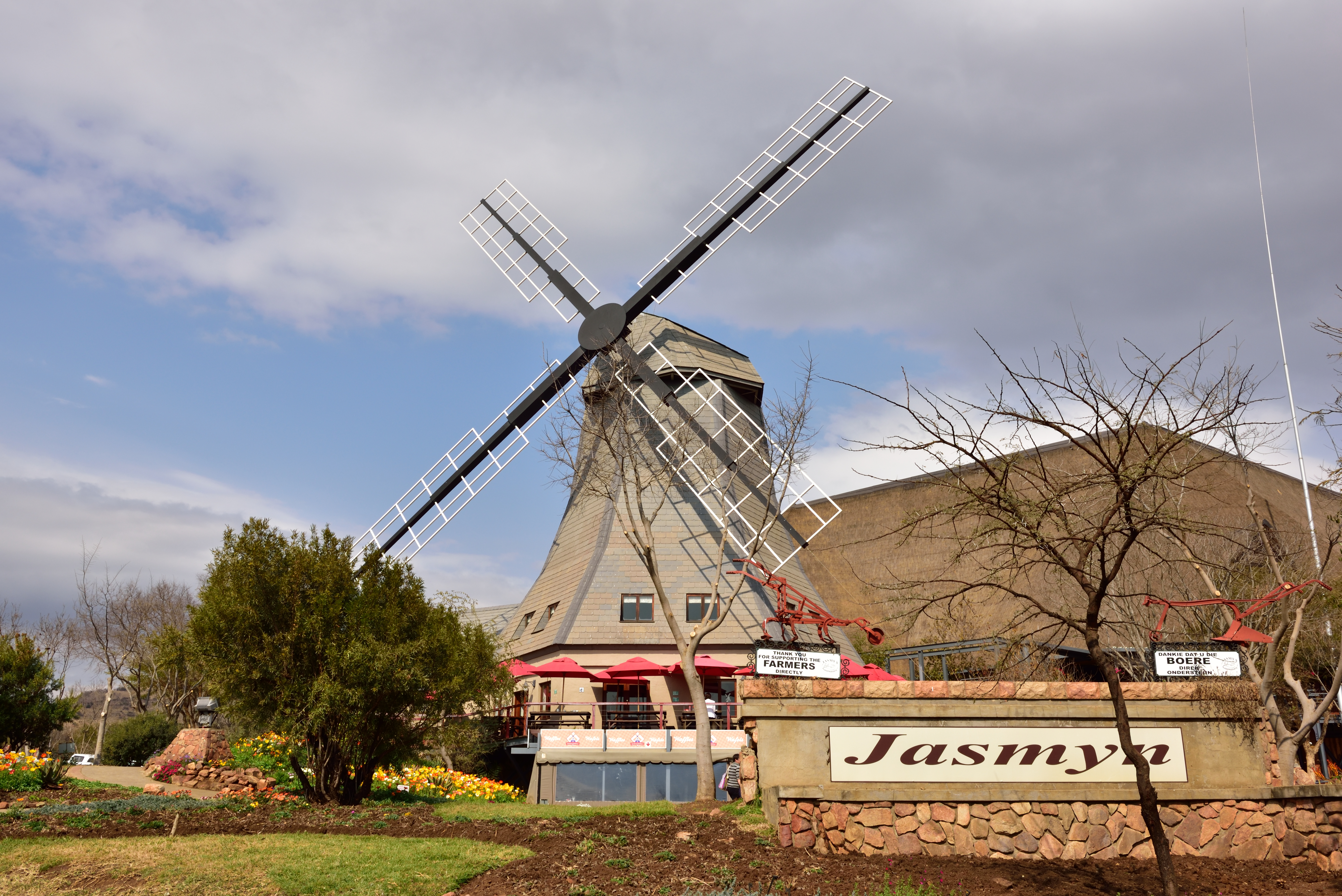
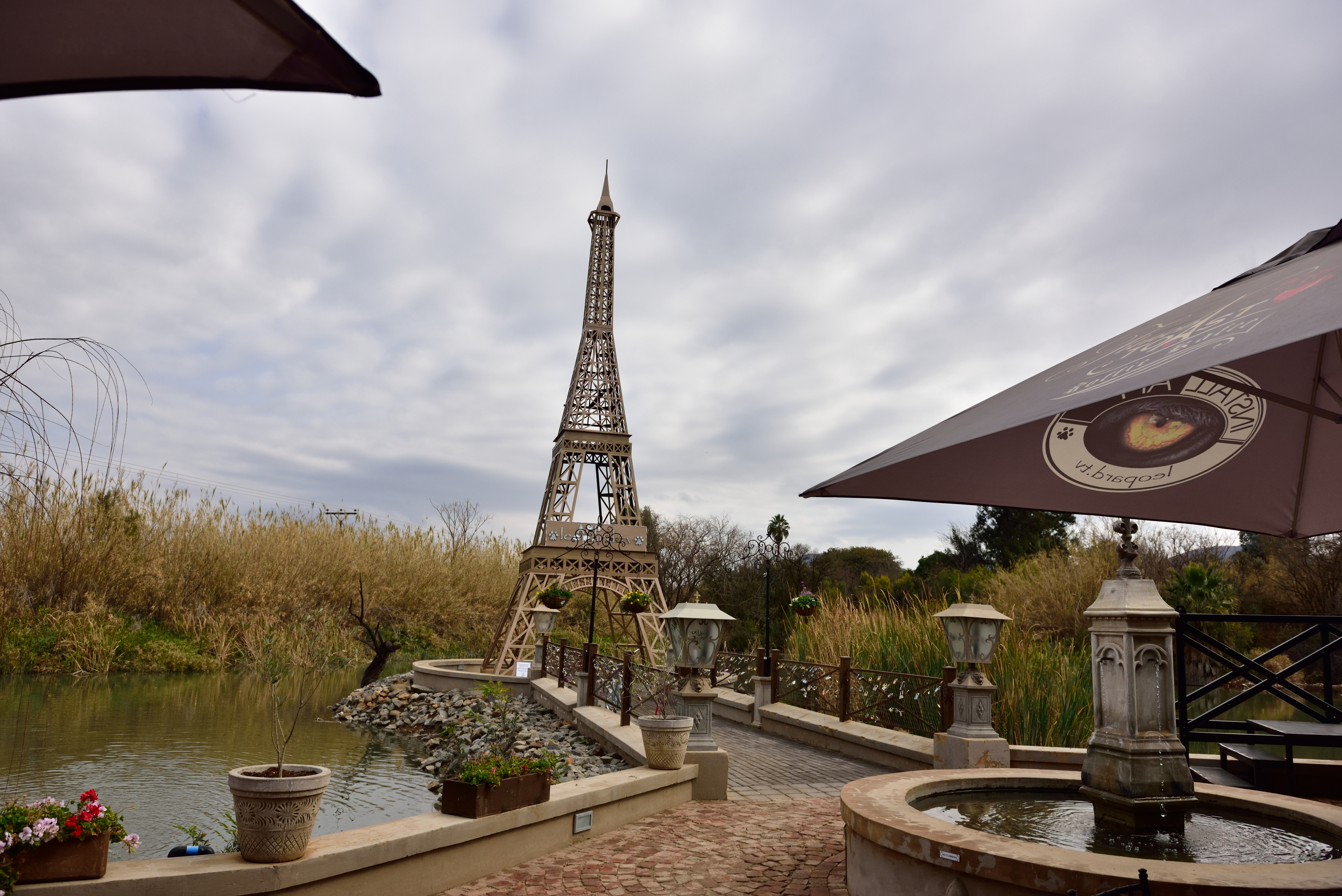
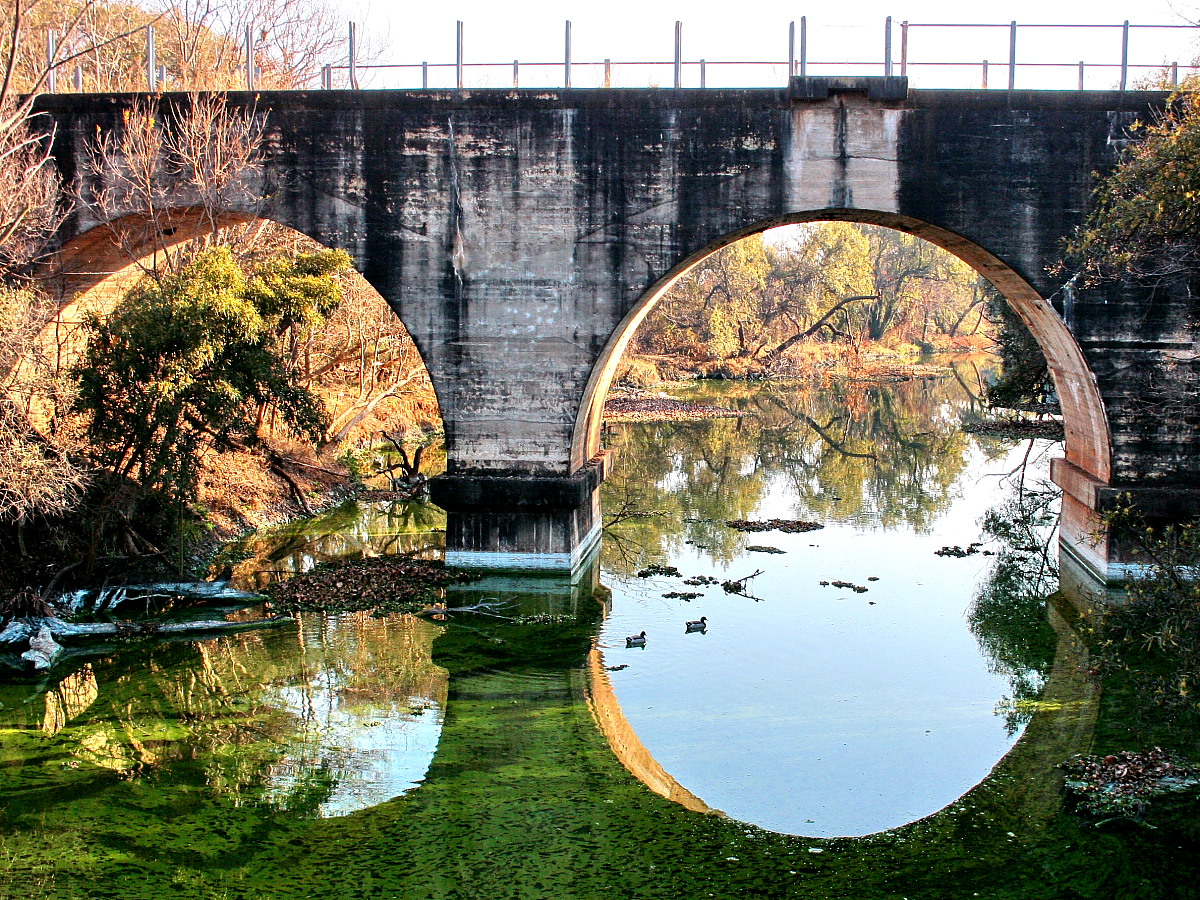
- Clockwise from top: View of Hartebeespoort, Jasmyn Farmers Market, Old Railway Bridge, French Village, Hartebeespoort Dam.

- Location within North West (South African province) Location within South Africa
- Coordinates: 25°44′39″S 27°53′58″E
- Country: South Africa
- Province: North West
- District: Bojanala
- Municipality: Madibeng

Government
  - Councillor: Maritza du Plessis (Ward 33); Erna Rossouw (Ward 30)

Area
  - Total: 125.89 km^{2} (48.61 sq mi)

Population (2011)
  - Total: 22,374
  - Density: 177.73/km^{2} (460.31/sq mi)

Racial makeup (2011)
  - Black African: 38.2%
  - Coloured: 1.1%
  - Indian/Asian: 0.7%
  - White: 59.4%
  - Other: 0.5%

First languages (2011)
  - Afrikaans: 46.5%
  - Tswana: 19.3%
  - English: 7.3%
  - Tsonga: 6.2%
  - Other: 20.7%
- Time zone: UTC+2 (SAST)
- Postal code (street): 0216
- PO box: 0216
- Area code: 012

Hartbeespoort, informally known as "Harties", is a small resort town in the North West Province of South Africa, situated on slopes of the Magaliesberg mountain and the banks of the Hartbeespoort Dam. The name of the town means "gateway of the hartbees" (a species of antelope) in Afrikaans. Schoemansville, named after General Hendrik Schoeman, a Boer General in the Anglo-Boer War, who owned the farm that the Hartbeespoort Dam was built on, is the oldest neighbourhood of Hartbeespoort.

Hartbeespoort is the collective name of a few smaller towns situated around the Hartbeespoort Dam, including the towns of Meerhof, Ifafi, Melodie, Schoemansville and Kosmos.

The town consists of holiday homes and permanent residences around the dam as it is popular with visitors from nearby Gauteng Province. It is home to the Om Die Dam (English: Around the dam) ultra marathon of 50 km, which takes place annually in the first half of the year.

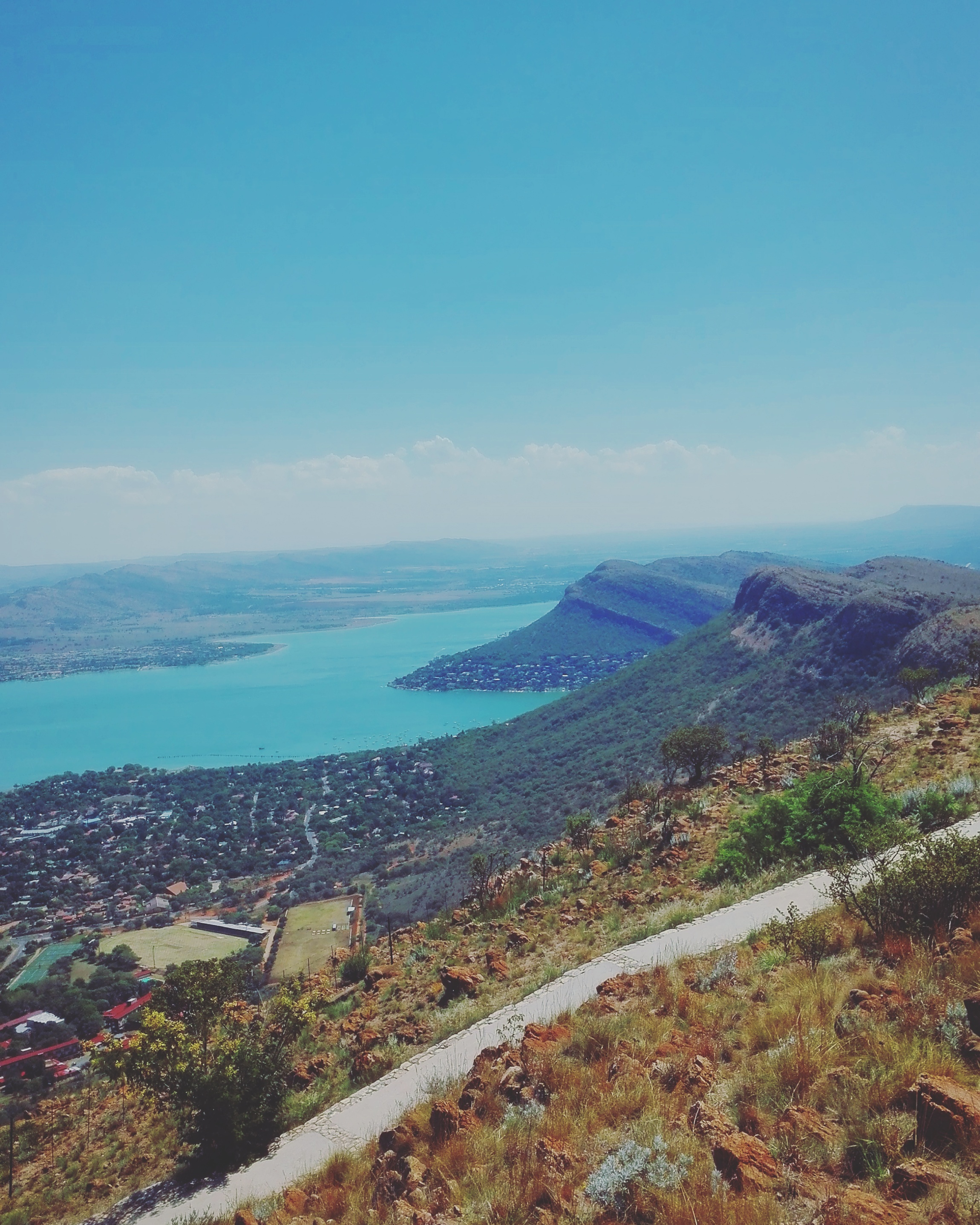
Hartbeespoort Dam seen from the top of the Harties Cableway

Some of the main tourist attractions in or around the town are:

- The Hartbeespoort Dam wall and tunnel
- The Hartbeespoort Dam Snake Park
- The Hartbeespoort Dam Aquarium
- Hartbeespoort Aerial Cableway (the longest monocableway in Africa)
- Transvaal Yacht Club
- Oberon Leisure Resort
- Welwitchia Country Market
- The Elephant Sanctuary Hartbeespoort Dam
- Bushbabies Monkey Sanctuary
- Lion and Safari Park reserve
- Harties horse trail safaris
- Chameleon Village

Other leisure-oriented venues around the dam include Pecanwood Golf Estate, Hartbeespoort Boat Club (near Kosmos), Sandy Lane Golf Club (at Caribbean Beach Club), Kosmos Marina Club, Magalies Park (estate and golf club). A number of other leisure developments and resorts are in progress. Local tourism booking services and destination logistics are supported by regional digital marketplaces, including Visit Hartbees.

In 2010 the Hartbeespoort Aerial Cableway was completely revamped and modernised and officially reopened on 14 August 2010 by Minister of Tourism Marthinus van Schalkwyk.

Hartbeespoort is part of the Madibeng Local Municipality, that also includes the nearby town of Brits.

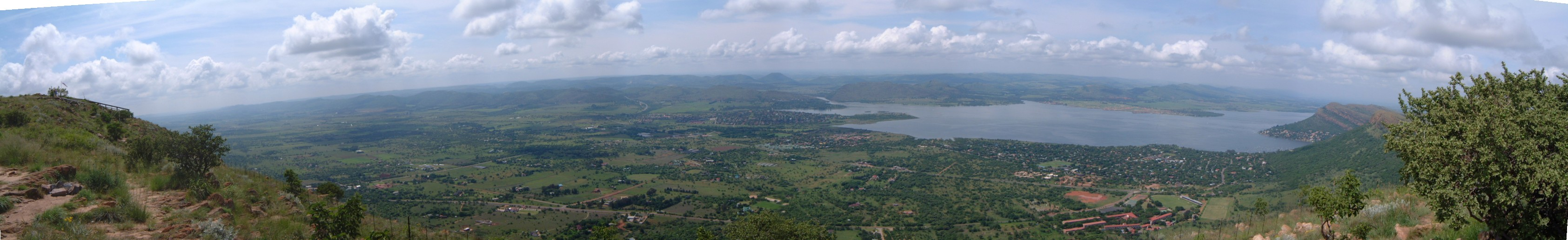
Composite panorama of Schoemansville (lower right) and Hartbeespoort Dam looking South

Despite the semi-rural setting of the Hartbeespoort environs, it is ranked by the World Health Organization as the most polluted town in South Africa in terms of airborne particulates, with air pollution levels roughly twice that of Vereeniging, a heavily industrialised city south of Johannesburg.

== See also ==
- Bushbabies Monkey Sanctuary
- Microcystin
- Eutrophication
