= Magaliesberg =

Mountain range in South Africa

- Macalisberg, Cashan Mountains, Dithaba Diloka.
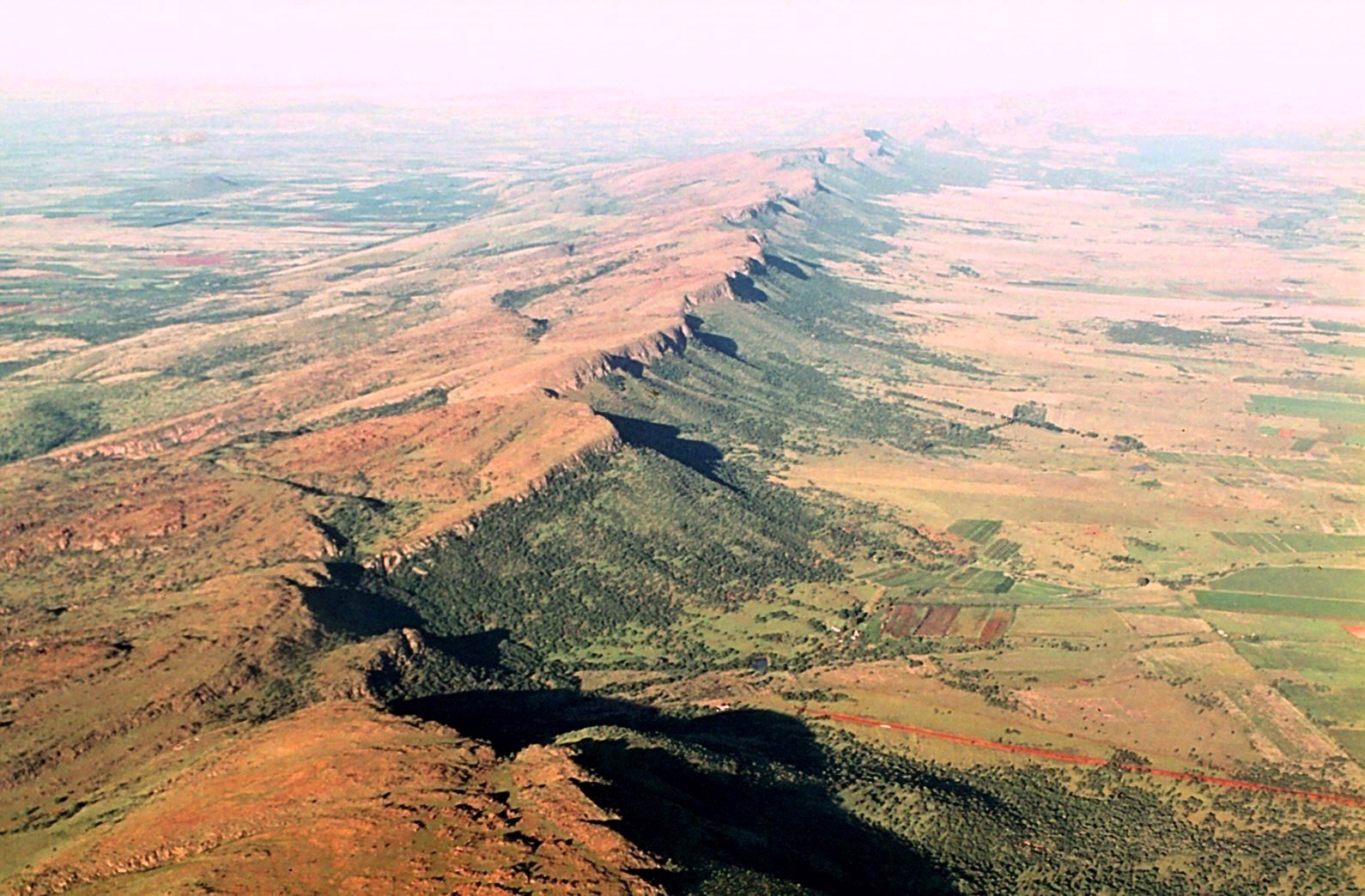
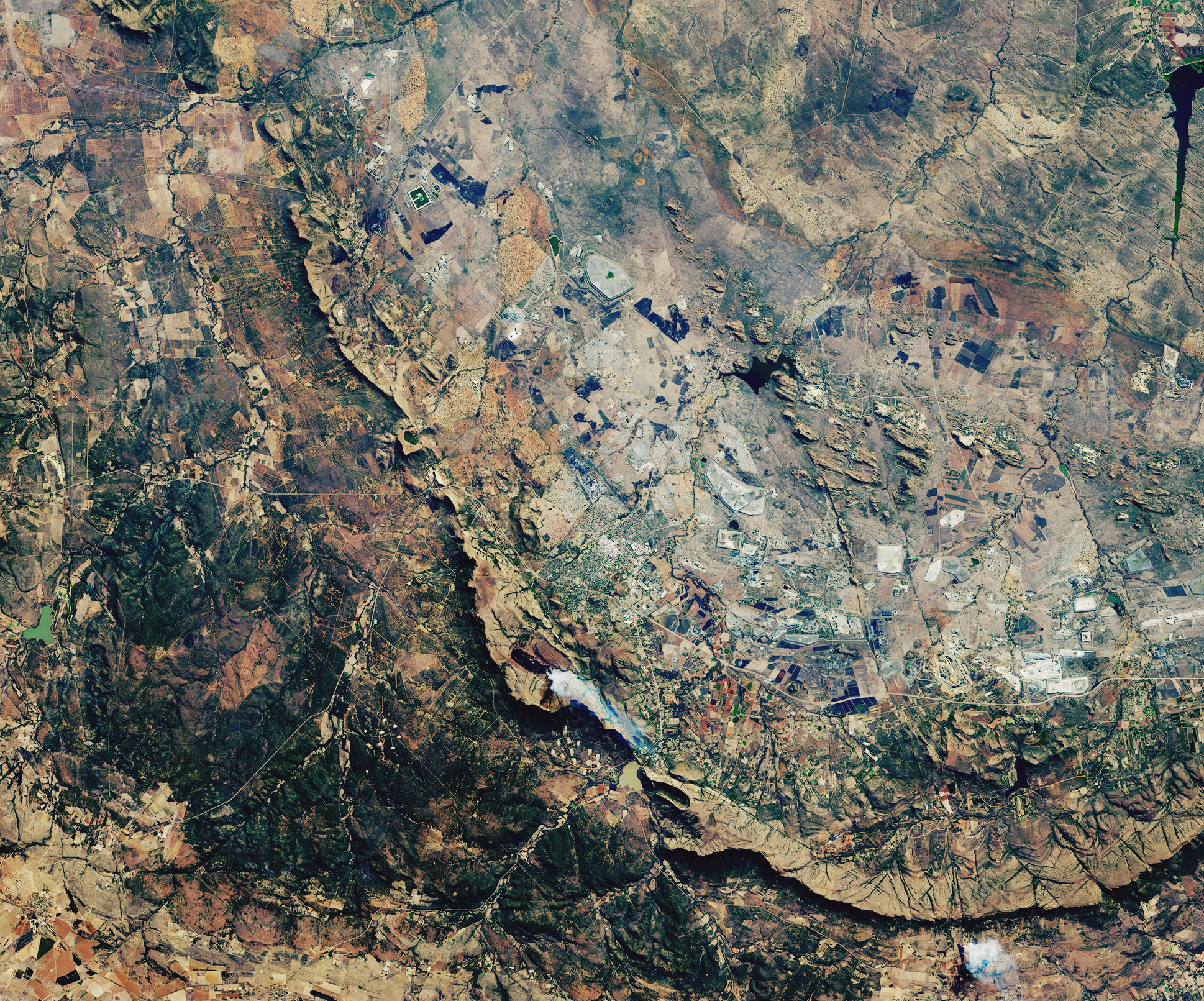
- Magaliesberg east to Hartebeespoort Dam from vicinity of Castle Gorge Magaliesberg mountain range, seen from space with the Operational Land Imager on Landsat 8, 27 June 2018

Highest point
- Elevation: 1,852 m (6,076 ft)
- Coordinates: 25.8583°S 27.530°E

Dimensions
- Area: 357,870 hectares (884,300 acres)

Naming
- Etymology: Mogale's mountain

Geography
- Location within South Africa
- Location: South Africa
- Range coordinates: 25.5002°S 27.3603°E
- Biome: Bushveld and Highveld

Geology
- Rock age: 2.3 billion years (Orosirian Period)
- Mountain type: Mountain range
- Rock type: Nooitgedacht

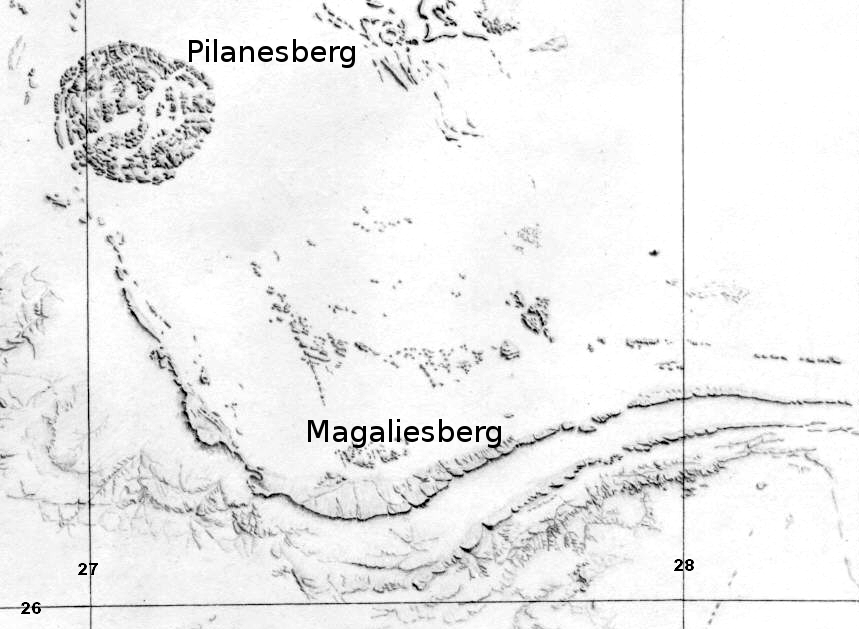
Magaliesberg and Pilanesberg

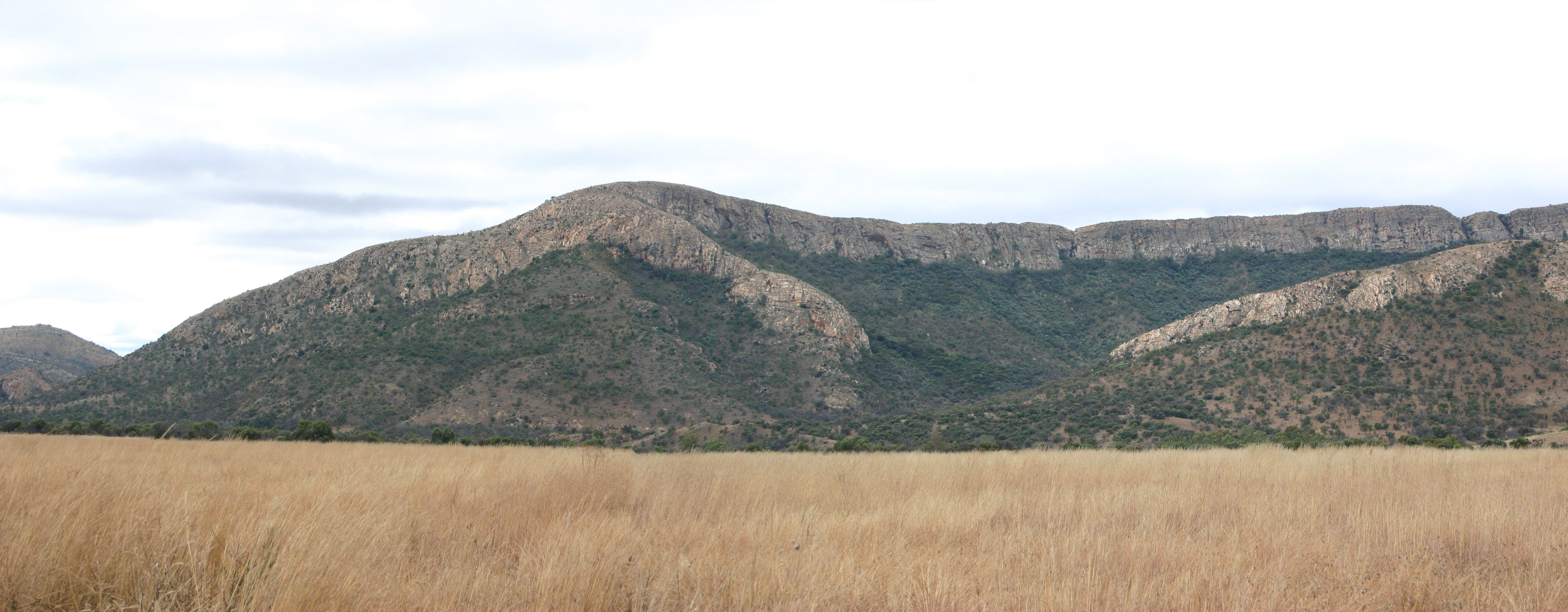
Magaliesberg near Olifantsnek Dam

The Magaliesberg (historically also known as Macalisberg or Cashan Mountains) of northern South Africa, is a modest but well-defined mountain range composed mainly of quartzites. It rises at a point south of the Pilanesberg (and the Pilanesberg National Park) to form a curved prominence that intersects suburban Pretoria before it peters out some 50 km (31 mi) to the east, just south of Bronkhorstspruit. The highest point of the Magaliesberg is reached at Nooitgedacht, about 1,852 metres (6,076 ft) above sea level. A cableway reaching to the top of the mountain range is located at Hartbeespoort Dam, providing sweeping views of the Magaliesberg and surrounding area.

== Geology ==
The Magaliesberg has ancient origins. Its composition is ascribed to successive geological processes over a very protracted history. Its quartzites, shales, chert and dolomite were deposited as sediments in an inland basin on top of a 3 billion year old Archaean Basement Complex, known as the Kaapvaal craton. This process of sedimentation lasted for about 300 million years. About 2 billion years ago, a massive upwelling of molten magma resulted in what is now known as the Bushveld Igneous Complex. The enormous weight of this intrusion depressed the sediments that lay beneath and tilted the sediments along the edges so that the broken escarpments faced outward and upward, and the gentler dip slopes inward. During the same period, these sediments were fractured and igneous intrusions of dolerite filled the cracks. With the passage of time these intrusions eroded, especially on the dip slopes, forming deep kloofs or ravines providing rock-climbing potential to modern man. This large dog-leg-shaped area is now termed the Transvaal Basin and includes the lofty escarpment of the Transvaal Drakensberg overlooking the Lowveld in the eastern part of the country. Massive outpourings of igneous material–volcanic lava–of the much younger Karoo Supergroup later covered the Transvaal Basin, but this was subsequently eroded so that it only remains along the Transvaal Basin's southern rim.

== Climate ==
Rain showers over the Magaliesberg mountain range at Silverton, Pretoria.

The range forms a natural barrier between the lower lying Bushveld to the north and the cooler Highveld to the south. The range receives rainfall in summer in the form of thunderstorms, with an average of 650 mm (26 in) annually. In winter, frost occurs frequently in the valleys on the southern side of the mountain, but almost never on the northern slopes.

== History ==
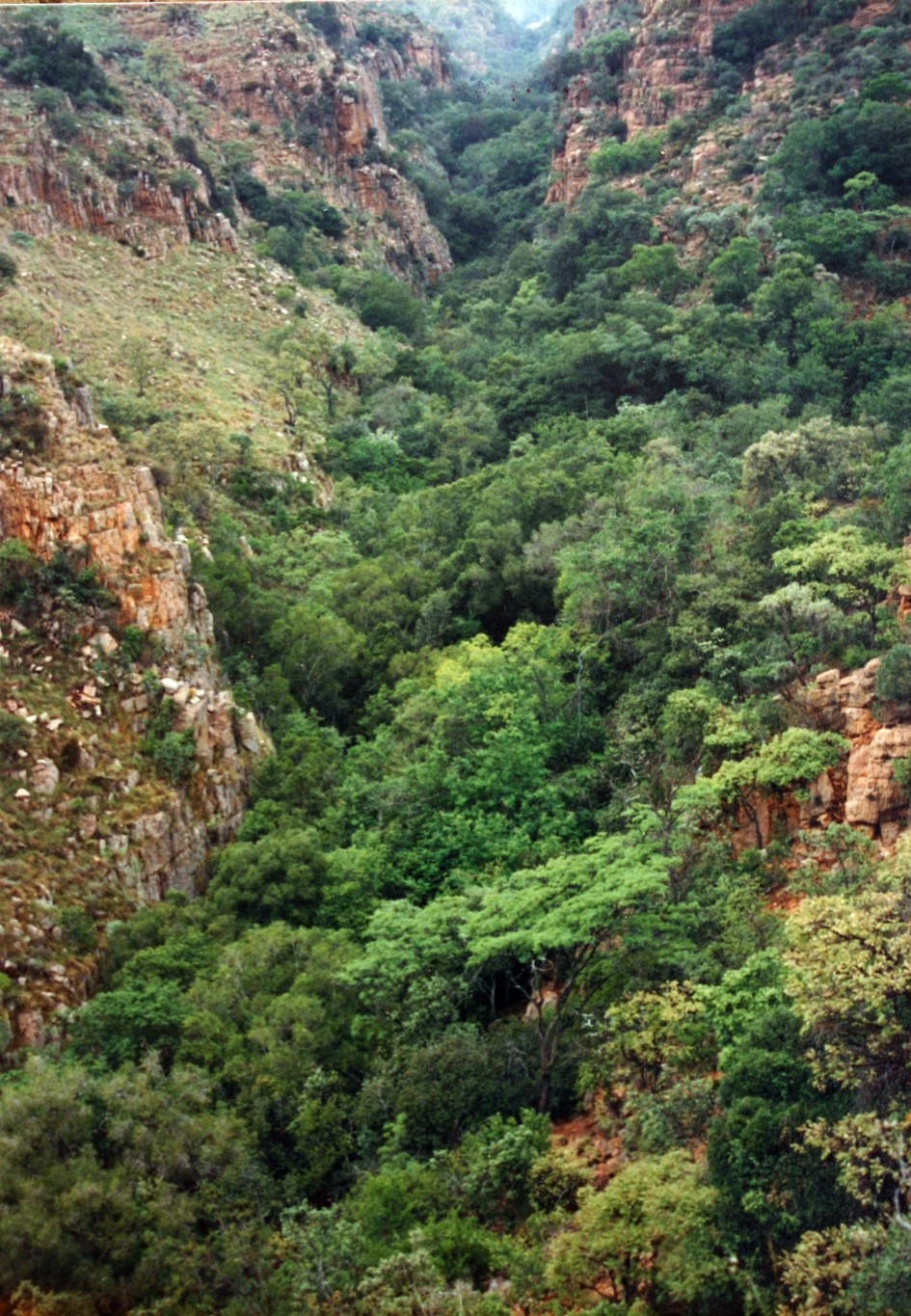
Tonquani Kloof in the Magaliesberg

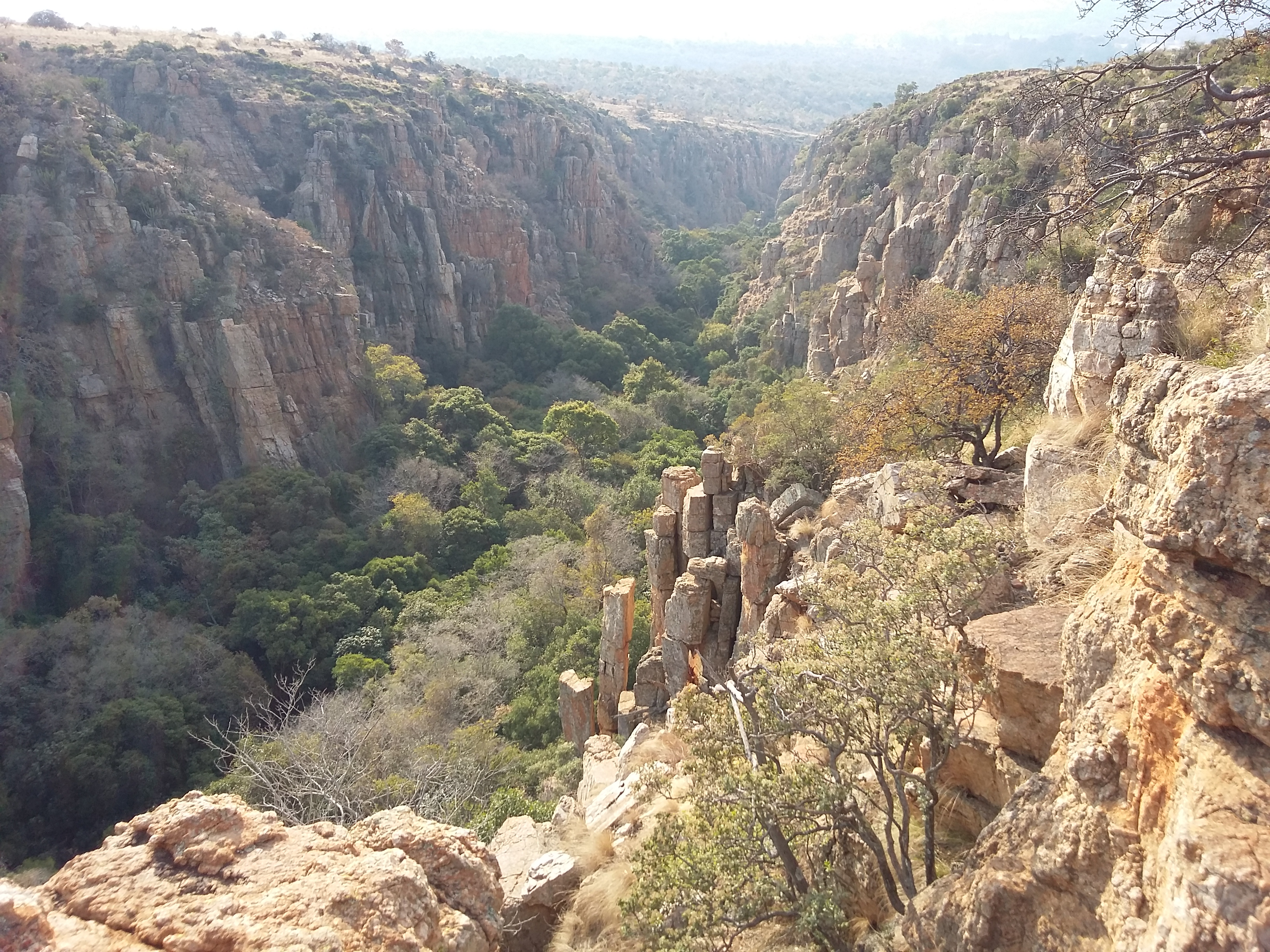
Hamerkop Kloof

The area around the Magaliesberg range has seen extremely lengthy occupation by humans dating back at least 2 million years to the earliest hominin species (such as Mrs Ples) in and around the Sterkfontein Caves, which lie at the Cradle of Humankind World Heritage Site, close to the town of Magaliesburg.

The earliest known name for the Magaliesberg mountains is Dithaba Diloka. This is a local seTswana name in reference to the abundance of Heteropogon contortus which grows in the area. However it seems this name would have only been used by neighbouring Sotho-Tswana_peoples coming to and from the Magaliesberg mountains. Local resident Tswana tribes referred to it simply as Dithaba "The mountains".

The first European explorers who came to the area recorded the mountains being called the "Cashan" or "Kashan" mountains. This was a corruption of the name of a powerful chief of the BaKwena ba Mmatau whose name was Kgwasane wa Sekano (Kgwasane, son of Sekano).

In the mid-1800s the mountain range became known as Magaliesberg (lit. Mogale's mountain) after Kgosi Mogale. Mogale means "sharp" or "brave" person, but is also the common word for a warrior or Tswana soldier, in Sotho bogale means "sharp" and mogale is "brave". Similarly, the mountain range to the north, near Sun City, Pilanesberg, was named after the local Bakgatla chiefs, who were called Pilane.

In 1822, Shaka, the leader of the Zulu Kingdom, sent his most trusted commander, Mzilikazi, to conquer the Sotho tribes of the region. After accomplishing this task, Mzilikazi decided to break away from Shaka and found his own nation, the Matabele. As he feared an attack from Shaka if he returned home, he settled in the Magaliesberg region.

On 17 January 1837, after some Voortrekkers had been attacked and killed by Mzilikazi's impis, they counter-attacked and, under the leadership of Hendrik Potgieter and Gerrit Maritz, and with the help of local Sotho-Tswana chiefdoms, drove the Matabeles north across the Limpopo River. Because the re-conquest of the region was a cooperative venture of the Boers and the Sotho-Tswana against the Matabele, the Boers and Sotho-Tswana had friendly relations at the beginning of white settlement. These friendly relations are reflected in the name of the main Boer town, Rustenburg (lit. resting town), because it seemed to them that they would not have to engage in any more fighting against African communities. The Boers initially settled south of the Magaliesberg in the Highveld, leaving the Bushveld north of the Magaliesberg mostly to their Sotho-Tswana friends and allies; according to Sarah Heckford's memoir, A Lady Trader in the Transvaal, the Boers would move into the Bushveld to visit their Sotho-Tswana neighbors during the winter. According to oral testimony by Tswana headmen recorded around the turn of the 20th century, many individual Boers formed close friendships with prominent individual Tswana headmen and chiefs, especially for the purpose of forming hunting parties to gather ivory and other products from further north. Subsequently the Boers began settling in the valleys of the Magaliesberg Range and in the Bushveld north of the Magaliesberg, and turned the region into some of the most productive farmland in South Africa, while displacing their former allies, confining them to locations and reserves.

The area saw some heavy fighting during the Second Anglo-Boer War. The Boers, being extremely familiar with the mountains, used secret pathways across the mountains to launch guerrilla attacks on the British soldiers. In response, the British forces built blockhouses on top of the mountains in order to restrict the movement of the Boer forces; ruins of these structures are still to be seen on the mountain.

Control of the Magaliesberg Mountain Range was of great importance to both the Boer and the British forces, especially the two routes between Pretoria and Rustenburg, which crossed it at Silkaatsnek and Kommandonek, respectively. As a result, many battles, such as the battles of Buffelspoort, Nooitgedacht and Olifantsnek were fought in the area.

After the war, farms in the area were reoccupied and farming was resumed, tobacco and citrus being particularly successful.

In 1923 the Hartbeespoort Dam, situated in one of the valleys of the range, was completed. It became a popular holiday and weekend destination for the inhabitants of Johannesburg and Pretoria, and the villages of Hartbeespoort and Kosmos developed as a result.

At present, the Magaliesberg area is still largely agricultural, although tourism is a rapidly growing industry in the area.

Kgaswane Mountain Reserve is a nature reserve above Rustenburg covering 4,257 ha (10,520 acres) of the Magaliesberg.

Numerous smaller reserves, private and state, are to be found along the length of the range.

== Magaliesberg Biosphere Reserve ==
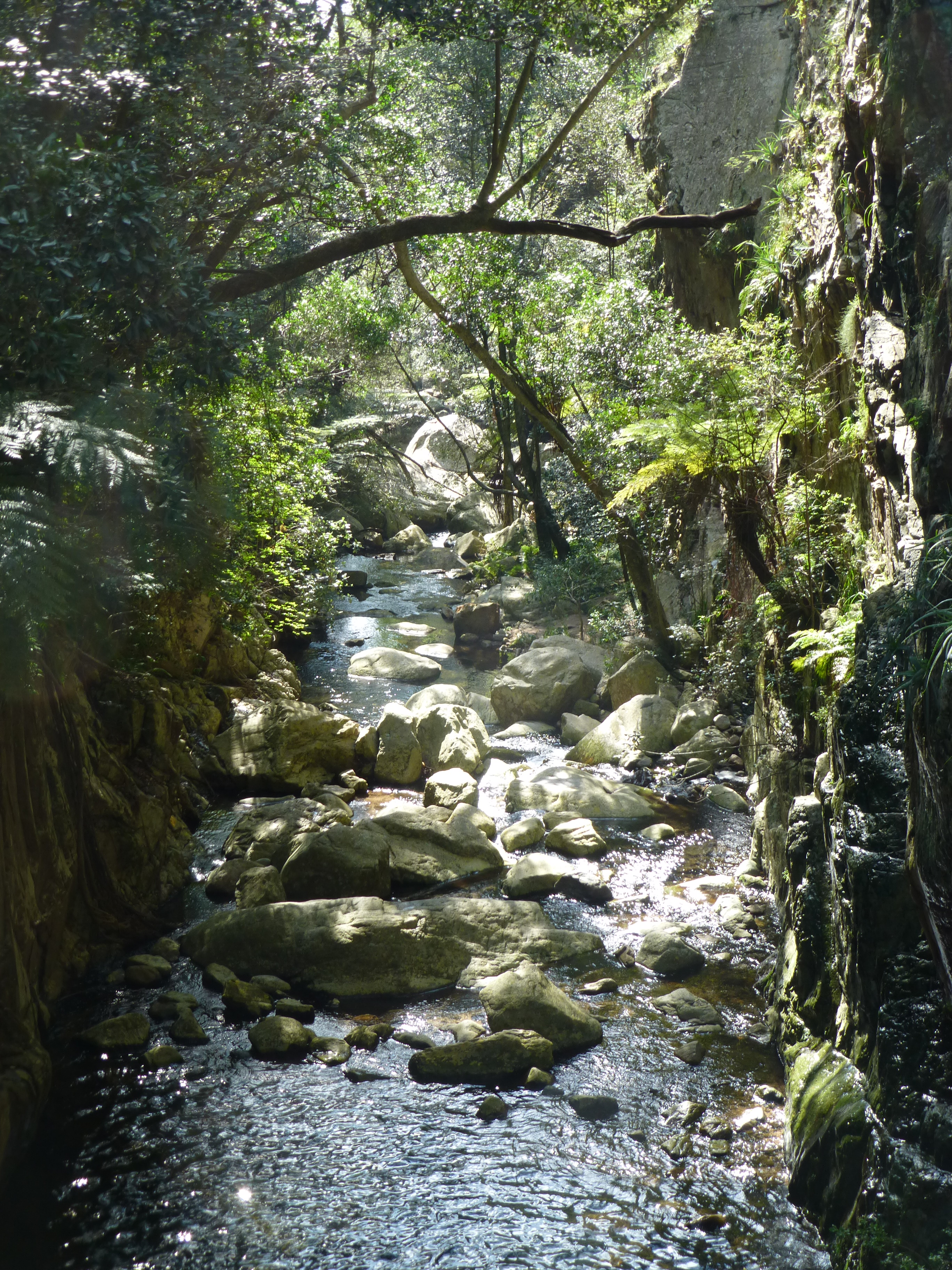
Tonquani Kloof, Magaliesberg

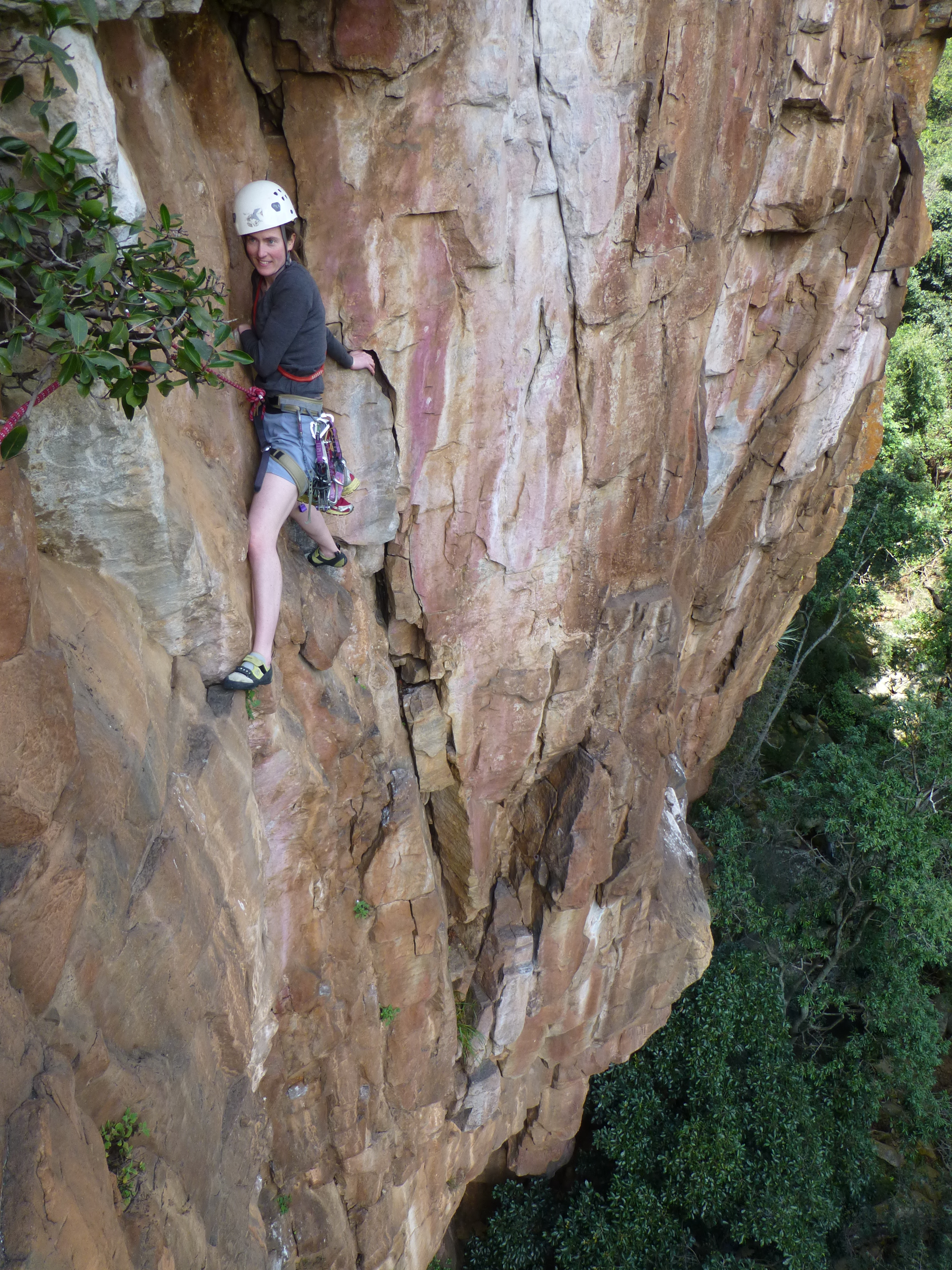
Rock climbing in Tonquani Kloof

After nearly a decade of lobbying and sustained efforts by a small committee of dedicated environmentalists, the Magaliesberg has been declared a World Biosphere Reserve.

The announcement was made on 9 June 2015 in Paris by the International Coordinating Council of the Programme on Man and the Biosphere (MAB). This is a UNESCO programme that aims to build a supportive and sustainable relationship between people and their environments. In effect, this means a specific focus on safeguarding natural ecosystems through innovative approaches to economic development.

The World Network of Biosphere Reserves, which Magaliesberg now joins, counts 631 biosphere reserves in 119 countries.

"We are delighted with this final acknowledgement of the unique nature of the Magaliesberg and the powerful contribution it is making to our country, to the ecosystem services in Gauteng and the North West and the communities it nurtures over an extensive area," said Paul Fatti, chair of the Magaliesberg Biosphere Initiative Group (MBIG) that has been lobbying authorities since 2007 to support the establishment of the biosphere.

Vincent Carruthers, past chair of MBIG and renowned author of The Magaliesberg, the most authoritative study of the mountain range, said that this announcement was the culmination of a campaign that began in 2006. "I'm most grateful there is now international recognition of this great mountain range that has witnessed the whole span of life, from its very origins," he said. "The Magaliesberg is almost 100 times older than Mount Everest and half the age of the earth, a unique treasure for us in this part of Africa."

== Rock climbing ==
The Magaliesberg mountains offer excellent rock climbing opportunities, spread across its many kloofs and escarpments. The climbing is mostly traditional, with a small number of sport climbing venues and hundreds of routes across a wide range of grades. The relatively mild climate allows year-round climbing.

== Gallery ==
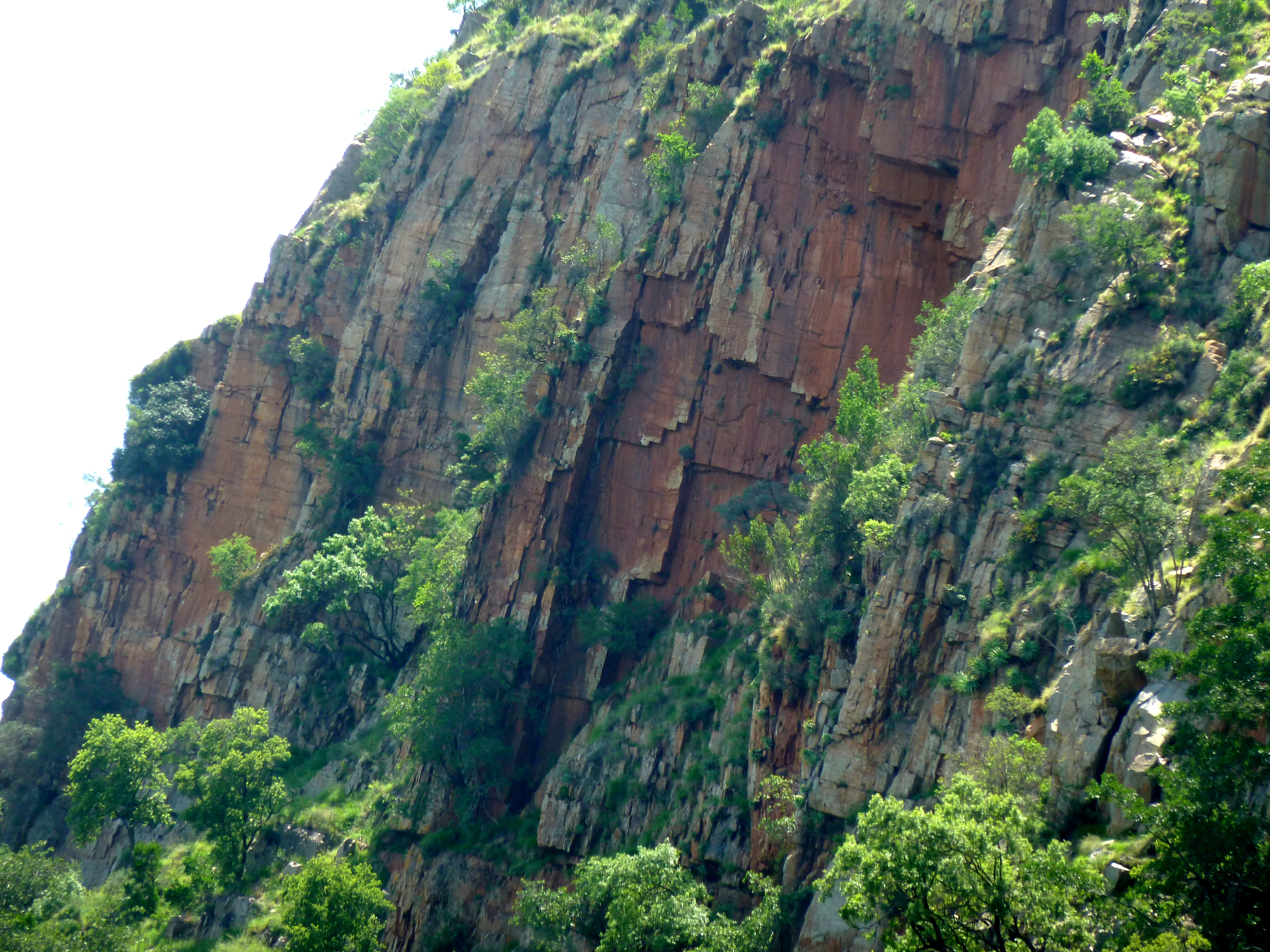
Northward tilt in sedimentary rock strata, caused by igneous activity

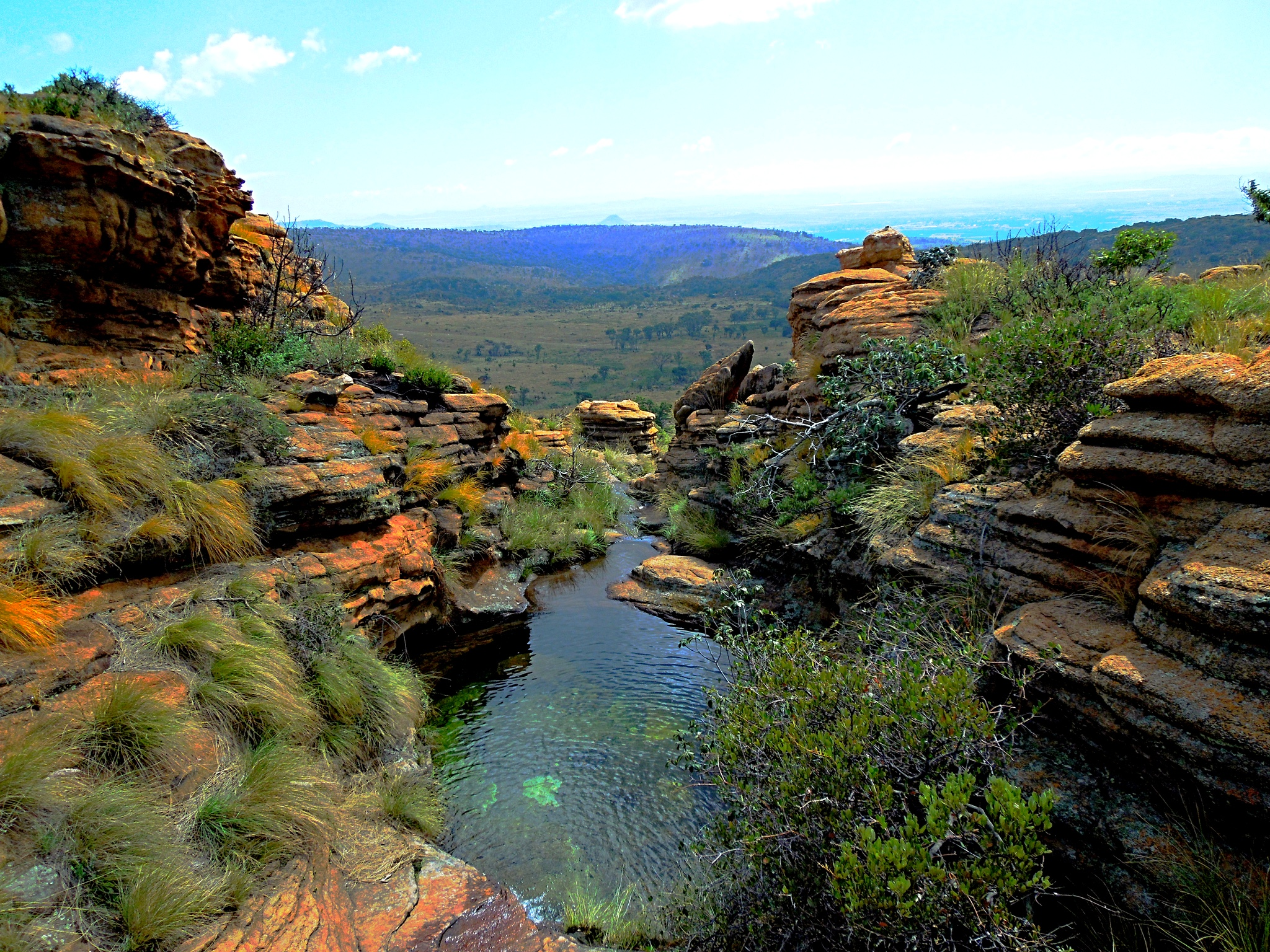
Streamlet and plunge pool on the tilted northern incline

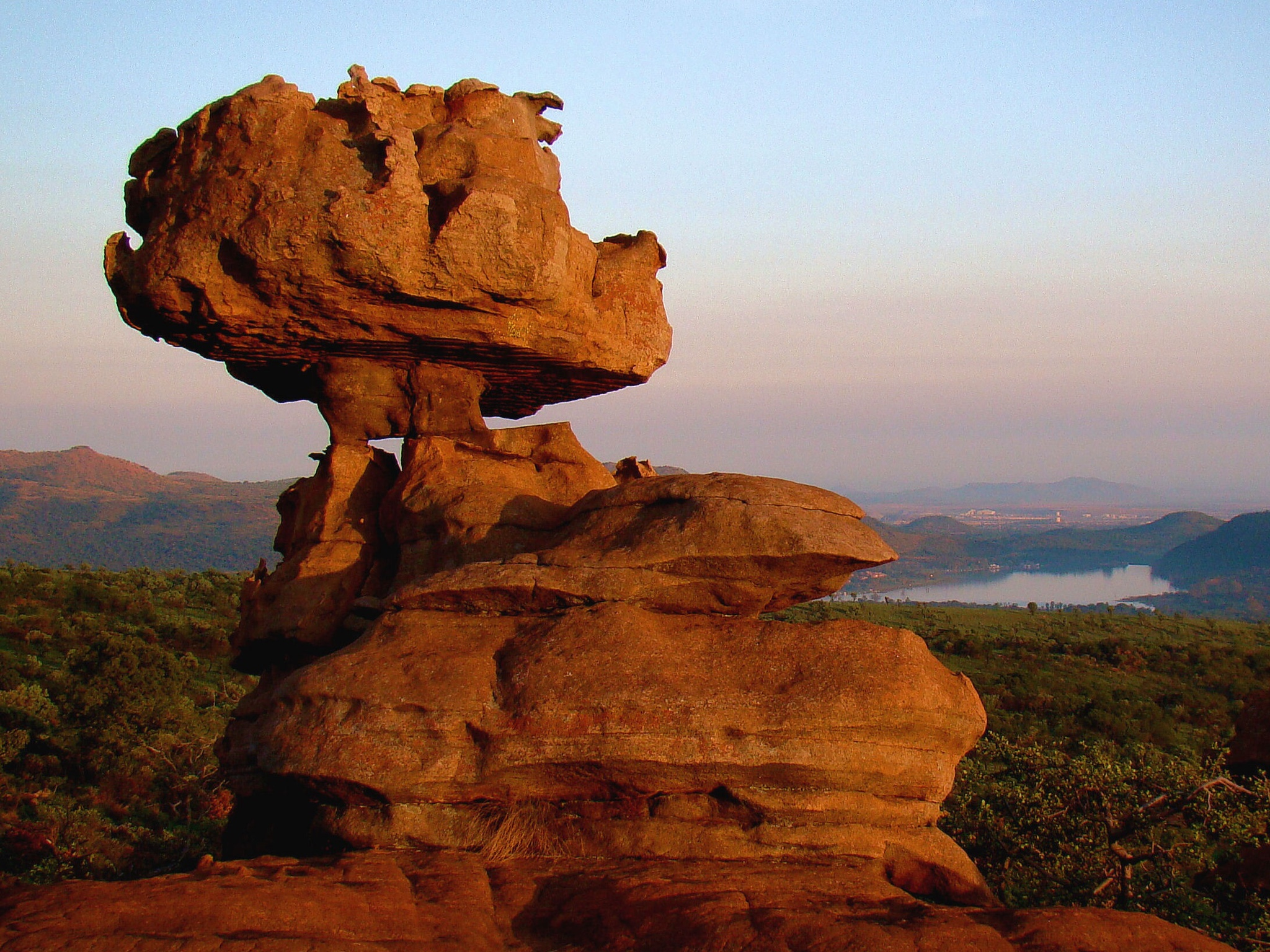
A quartzite pedestal rock in the central Magaliesberg

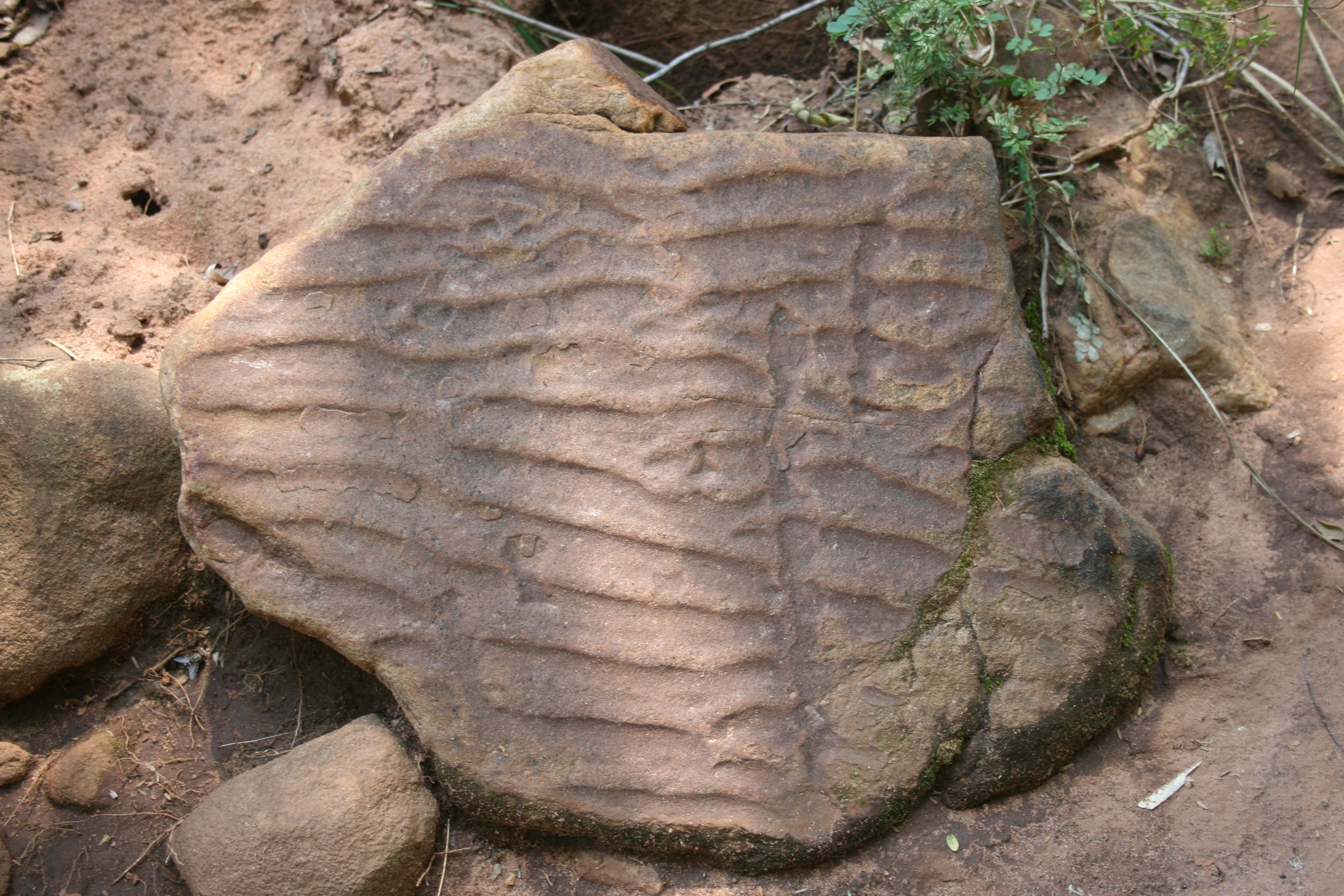
Lithified ripple marks on precambrian rocks, evidence of a shallow marine environment
