= Grace Ogot =

Kenyan author (1930–2015)

- Born: Grace Emily Akinyi; 15 May 1930; Asembo, Nyanza, Kenya
- Died: 18 March 2015 (aged 84); Nairobi, Kenya
- Known for: Author, nurse, journalist, politician and diplomat

Grace Emily Ogot (née Akinyi; 15 May 1930 – 18 March 2015) was a Kenyan author, nurse, journalist, politician and diplomat. Together with Charity Waciuma she was the first Anglophone female Kenyan writer to be published. She was one of the first Kenyan members of parliament and she became an assistant minister.

== Biography ==
Ogot was born Grace Emily Akinyi to a Christian family on 15 May 1930 in Asembo, in the district of Nyanza, Kenya – a village highly populated by the predominantly Christian Luo ethnic group. Her father, Joseph Nyanduga, was one of the first men in the village of Asembo to obtain a Western education. He converted early on to the Anglican Church, and taught at the Church Missionary Society’s Ng'iya Girls’ School. From her father, she learned the stories of the Old Testament and it was from her grandmother that Ogot learned the traditional folk tales of the area from which she would later draw inspiration.

Grace Ogot's background was very interesting. Ogot attended the Ng'iya Girls' School and Butere High School throughout her youth. From 1949 to 1953, she trained as a nurse at the Nursing Training Hospital in Uganda. She later worked in London, England, at St. Thomas Hospital for Mothers and Babies. She returned to the African nursing English.

In addition to her experience in healthcare, Ogot gained experience in multiple different areas, working for the BBC Overseas Service as a script-writer and announcer on the programme London Calling East and Central Africa, operating a prominent radio programme in the Luo language, working as an officer of community development in Kisumu County and as a public relations officer for the Air India Corporation of East Africa.

In 1975, Ogot worked as a Kenyan delegate to the general assembly of the United Nations. Subsequently, in 1976, she became a member of the Kenyan delegation to UNESCO. That year, she chaired and helped found the Writers' Association of Kenya. In 1983, she became one of only a handful of women to serve as a member of parliament and the only woman assistant minister in the cabinet of then President Daniel arap Moi.

== Personal life ==
In 1959, Grace Ogot married history professor Bethwell Allan Ogot, a Luo from Gem Location, and later became the mother of four children. Her proclivity for storytelling and her husband's interest in the oral tradition and history of the Luo peoples would later be combined in her writing career. Ogot died on 18 March 2015.

== Work ==
=== Writing career ===
In 1968, Grace Ogot read her short story "A Year of Sacrifice" at a conference on African Literature at Makerere University in Uganda. After discovering that there was no other work presented or displayed from East African writers, Ogot became motivated to publish her works, which she subsequently did both in the Luo language and in English. "A Year of Sacrifice" appeared in print as Ogot's first published work in the African journal Black Orpheus in 1963. In 1964, her short story "The Rain Came" was published as part of the collection Modern African Stories, co-edited by Es'kia Mphahlele, who had organised the earlier mentioned conference on African Literature at Makerere University in Uganda in 1962. "The Rain Came" was a reworked version of "A Year of Sacrifice" but considerably shortened and with a different beginning and ending. Also in 1964, the short story "Ward Nine" was published in the journal Transition.

Ogot's first novel The Promised Land, set in the 1930s, was published in 1966 and focused on Luo emigration and the problems that arise through migration. Her main protagonists emigrate from Nyanza to northern Tanzania, in search of fertile land and wealth. The story also focused on themes of tribal hatred, materialism, and traditional notions of femininity and wifely duties. 1968 saw the publishing of Land Without Thunder, a collection of short stories set in ancient Luoland. Ogot's descriptions, literary tools, and storylines in Land Without Thunder offer a valuable insight into Luo culture in pre-colonial East Africa. Her other works include The Strange Bride , The Graduate, The Other Woman and The Island of Tears.

Many of her stories are set against the scenic background of Lake Victoria and the traditions of the Luo people. One theme that features prominently within Ogot's work is the importance of traditional Luo folklore, mythologies, and oral traditions. This theme is at the forefront in "The Rain Came", a tale that was related to Ogot in her youth by her grandmother, whereby a chief's daughter must be sacrificed to bring rain. Furthermore, Ogot’s short stories juxtapose traditional and modern themes and notions, demonstrating the conflicts and convergences that exist between the old ways of thought and the new. In The Promised Land, the main character, Ochola, falls under a mysterious illness which cannot be cured through medical intervention. Eventually, he turns to a medicine man to be healed. Ogot explains such thought processes as exemplary of the blending of traditional and modern understandings, "Many of the stories I have told are based on day-to-day life… And in the final analysis, when the Church fails and the hospital fails, these people will always slip into something they trust, something within their own cultural background. It may appear to us mere superstition, but those who do believe in it do get healed. In day-to-day life in some communities in Kenya, both the modern and the traditional cures coexist."

Another theme that often appears throughout Ogot’s works is that of womanhood and the female role. Throughout her stories, Ogot demonstrates an interest in family matters, revealing both traditional and modern female gender roles followed by women, especially within the context of marriage and Christian traditions. Such an emphasis can be seen in The Promised Land, in which the notions both of mothers as the ultimate protectors of their children and of dominant patriarchal husband-wife relationships feature heavily. Critics such as Maryse Condé have suggested that Ogot's emphasis on the importance of the female marital role, as well as her portrayal of women in traditional roles, creates an overwhelmingly patriarchal tone in her stories. However, others have suggested that women in Ogot’s works also demonstrate strength and integrity, as in "The Empty Basket", where the bravery of the main female character, Aloo, is contrasted by the failings of the male characters. Through her wits and self-assertion, Aloo overcomes a perilous situation with a snake, while the men are stricken by panic. It is only after she rebukes and shames the men that they are roused to destroy the snake. In Ogot’s short stories, the women portrayed often have a strong sense of duty, as demonstrated in "The Rain Came", and her works regularly emphasise the need for understanding in relationships between men and women.

Prior to Kenyan Independence, while Kenya was still under a colonial regime, Ogot experienced difficulties in her initial attempts to have her stories published: "I remember taking some of my short stories to the manager [of the East African Literature Bureau], including the one which was later published in Black Orpheus. They really couldn't understand how a Christian woman could write such stories, involved with sacrifices, traditional medicines and all, instead of writing about Salvation and Christianity. Thus, quite a few writers received no encouragement from colonial publishers who were perhaps afraid of turning out radical writers critical of the colonial regime."

She was interviewed in 1974 by Lee Nichols for a Voice of America radio broadcast that was aired between 1975 and 1979 (Voice of America radio series Conversations with African Writers, no. 23). The Library of Congress has a copy of the broadcast tape and the unedited original interview. The broadcast transcript appears in the 1981 book Conversations with African Writers.

Three novels by her were posthumously published, launched by her husband in 2018.

== Publications ==
From the collection of the Library of Congress, Washington, DC:

- Aloo kod Apul-Apul (1981), in Luo.
- Ber wat (1981), in Luo.
- The Graduate, Nairobi: Uzima Press, 1980.
- The Island of Tears (short stories), Nairobi: Uzima Press, 1980.
- Land Without Thunder; short stories, Nairobi: East African Publishing House, 1968.
- Miaha (in Luo), 1983; translated as The Strange Bride by Okoth Okombo (1989)
- The Other Woman: Selected Short Stories, Nairobi: Transafrica, 1976.
- The Promised Land: a novel, Nairobi: East African Publishing House, 1966.
- The Strange Bride, translated from Dholuo (originally published as Miaha, 1983) by Okoth Okombo; Nairobi: Heinemann Kenya, 1989. ISBN 9966-46-865-X
- Simbi Nyaima - the Lake that Sank (2018)
- The Royal Bead (2018)
- Princess Nyilaak (2018)

== See also ==
- Luo people of Kenya and Tanzania
