= Kisumu =

City in Kisumu County, Kenya

- City
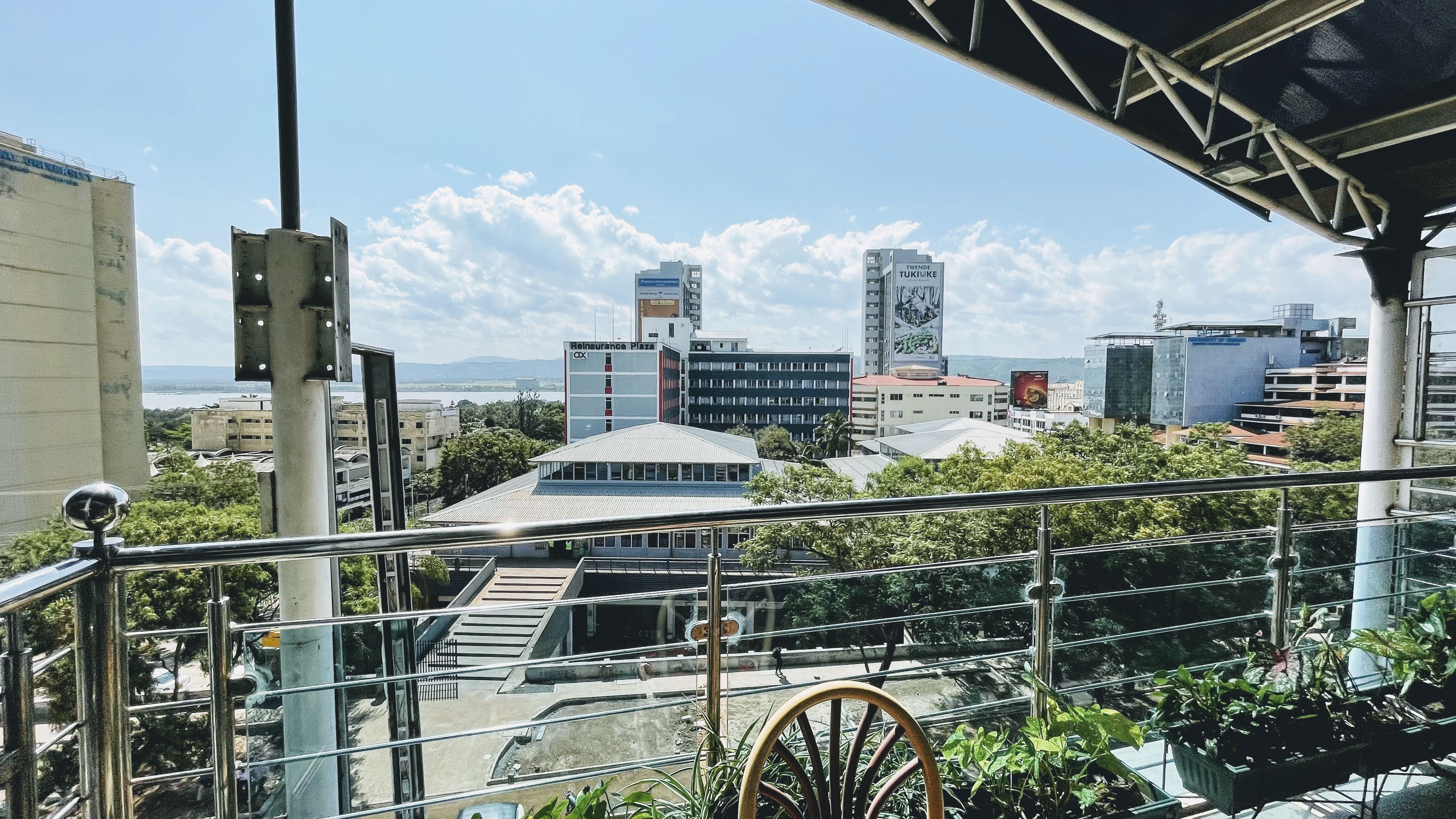
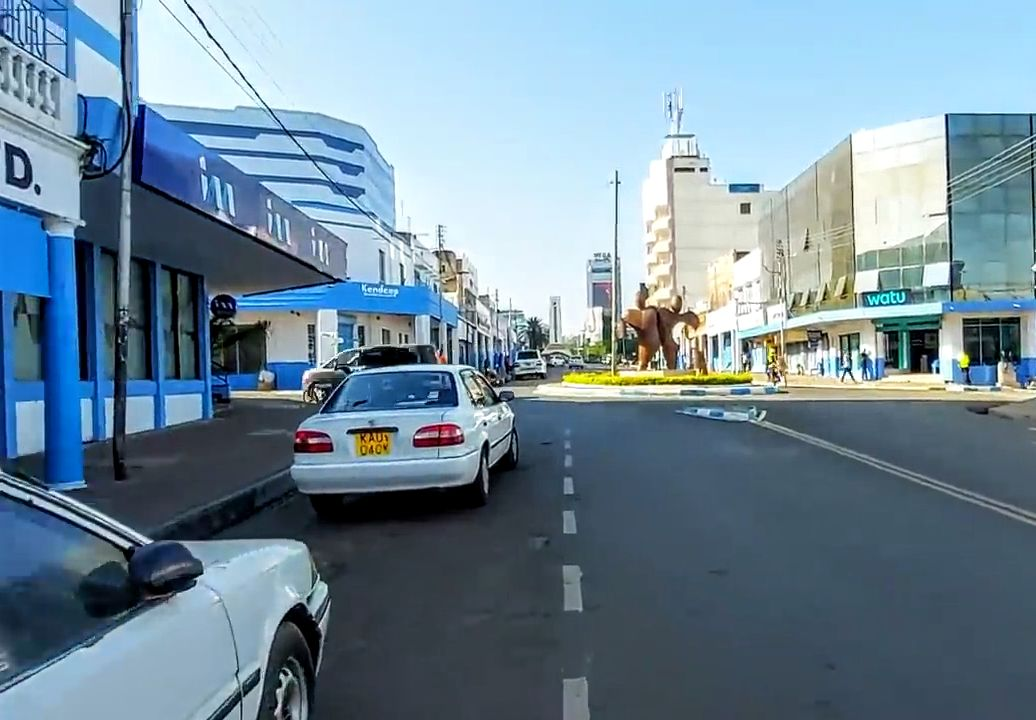
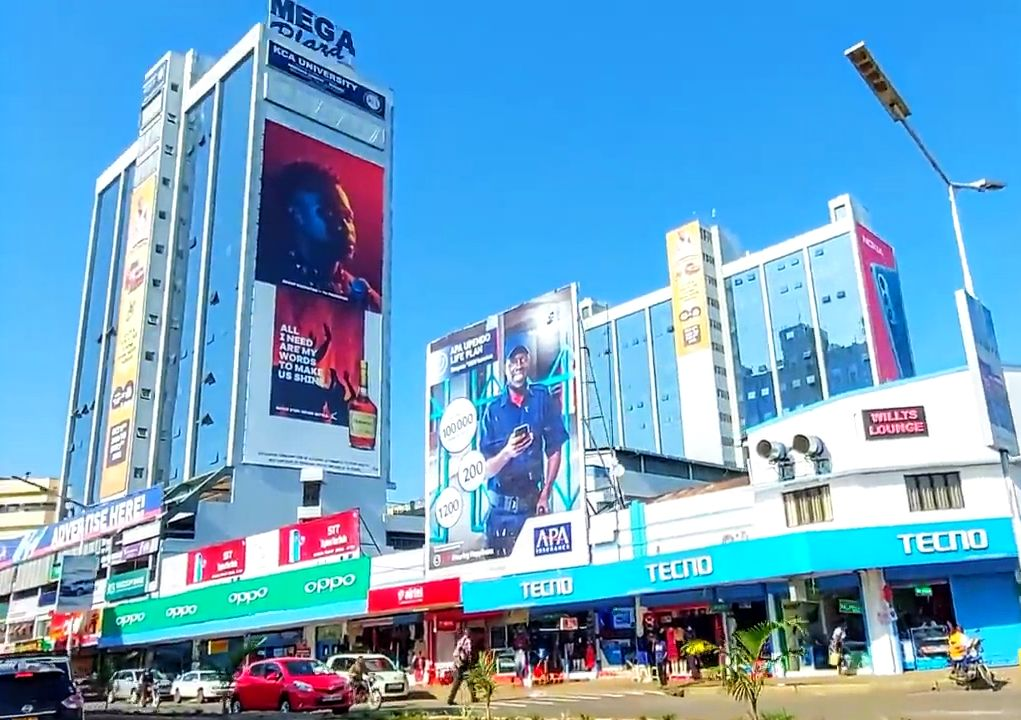
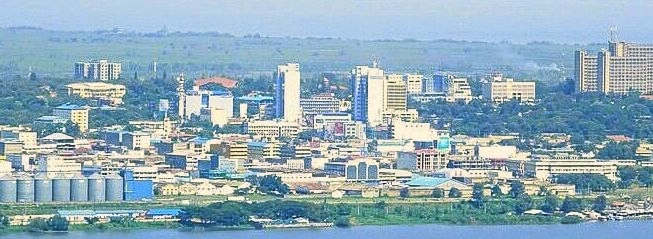
- Clockwise from top: View of the CBD from a Rooftop restaurant, Mega Plaza, Kisumu skyline, Oginga Odinga street.
- Nicknames: "Lakeside City", "Kisumo","Kisumu Dala","Kisumo Pacho","Mboka"
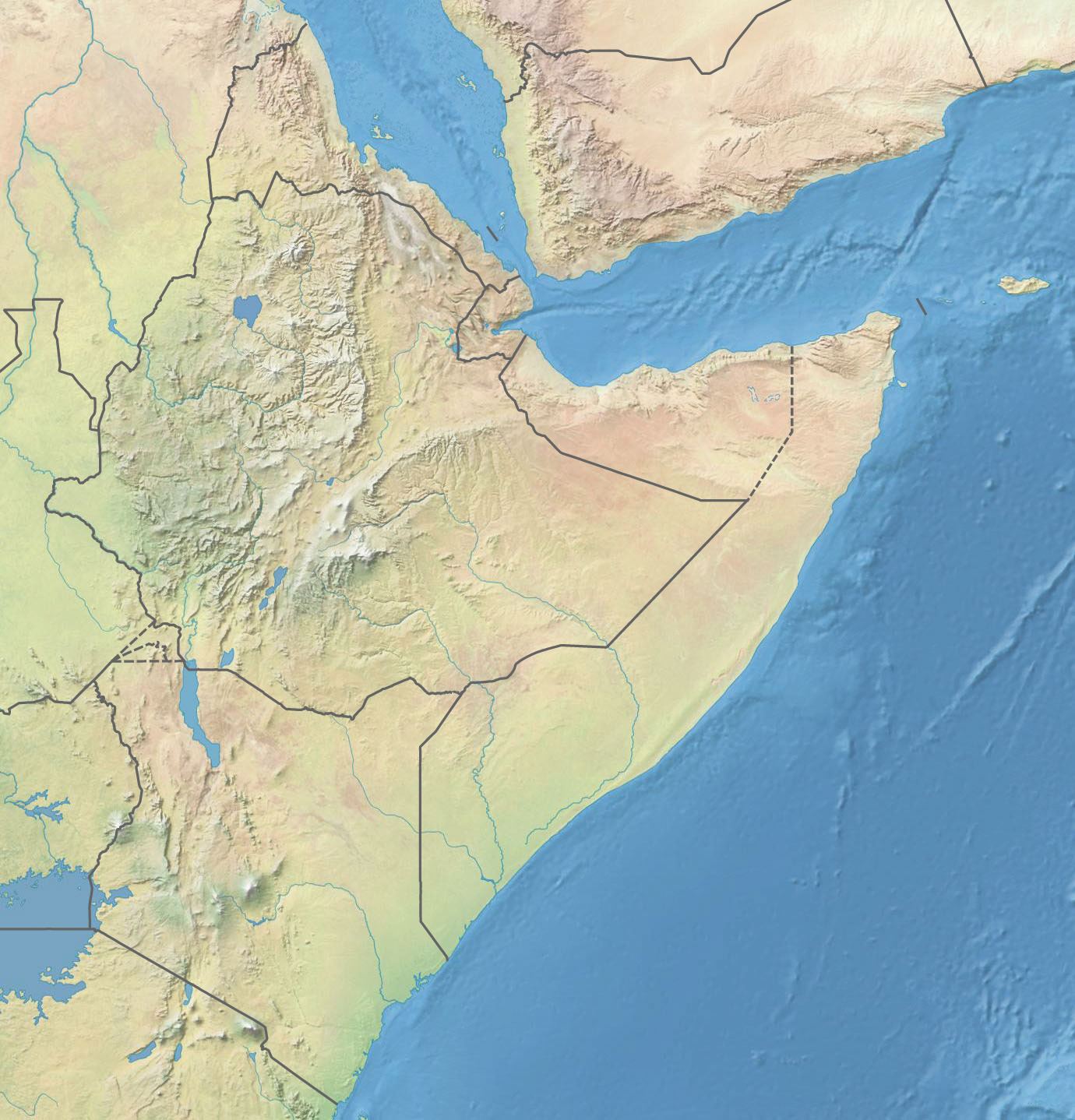
- Location within Kenya Location within the Horn of Africa Location within Africa
- Coordinates: 0°05′S 34°46′E
- Country: Kenya
- Founded: 1901

Government
  - Body: Kisumu County
  - Governor: Anyang' Nyong'o

Area
  - City: 297 km^{2} (115 sq mi)
  - Metro: 2,085 km^{2} (805 sq mi)
- Elevation: 1,131 m (3,711 ft)

Population (2019)
  - Urban: 397,957
  - Metro: 1,155,574

GDP (PPP)
  - Total: ▲$7.278 billion (7th)(2022)
  - Per Capita: ▲$5,926 (2022) (8th)

GDP (NOMINAL)
  - Total: ▲$2.672 billion (2022) (7th)
  - Per Capita: ▲$2,176 (2022) (8th)
- Time zone: UTC+3 (EAT)
- Postal code: 40100
- Area code: 042
- HDI (2017): 0.653 medium
- Website: kisumu.go.ke

Kisumu (/kiːˈsuːmuː/ kee-SOO-moo) is the third-largest city in Kenya located in the Lake Victoria area in the former Nyanza Province. It is the second-largest city in the Lake Victoria Basin after Kampala. The city has a population of 438,588 according to the recent 2026 population estimates. The metro region, including Maseno and Ahero, had a population of 6,771 (Maseno) and 11,801 (Ahero) people respectively, totaling to a combined population of 457,160 people, according to the 2019 Kenya Population and Housing Census which was conducted by the Kenya National Bureau of Statistics.

In addition to its political importance, the city is a significant industrial and commercial centre in Kenya. It is also home to a number of higher-education institutions and a sizeable academic community. The city has been undergoing efforts to rejuvenate its downtown and Lower Town areas, including improvements to the lakefront, measures to reduce congestion on major streets, and initiatives to make streets more pedestrian-friendly.

Culturally, Kisumu serves as the centre of the Luo people of East Africa. It was the most prominent urban centre in the pre-colonial and post-colonial period. It remains prominent in the modern era for natives of the Kavirondo region. It was briefly renamed Port Florence, before its name was reverted back.

The city serves as the capital of Kisumu County and was the immediate former capital of now-defunct Nyanza Province. It is an important link in the trade route between Lake Victoria and Mombasa because of its water and rail connections. It is also the chief terminus for the agricultural produce of Nyanza and Western regions. Kisumu International Airport has regular flights to Nairobi and other neighbouring cities such as Mombasa. According to the United Nations, Kisumu is now recognized as a key city and a "Millennium City" – the first of its kind in the world and also in East Africa.

Kisumu's elevation is 1,131 m (3,711 ft) and is about 320 km (200 mi) northwest of Nairobi, on the shores of Lake Victoria. It lies at the northeastern edge of the Winam Gulf, a long, shallow arm that protrudes from the main body of Lake Victoria. Kisumu is 24 km (15 mi) south of the equator and has, due to its elevation, moderate temperatures.

The metropolitan region comprises the city and its suburbs and satellite towns of Maseno, Kondele, and Ahero.

== Etymology ==
When Europeans first settled in the area in the late 19th century, Kisumu became a trading post, attracting Luo people from as far as Migori and Siaya County. The Kisumu region was then occupied by the Luo community. A person going to Kisumu at that time would say, "Adhi Kisuma" to mean I'm going to trade. Derived from the word "Kisuma", the word for a trading post in Luo is "Kisumo", and in Nandi, "Kesumett". The current name Kisumu is an English corruption of the word "Kisumo" or "Kesumett".

An opposing theory states that Kisumu acquired its name from 'Kusuma', the Maragoli word for 'trading'. Because, before Luo arrived in the area, the Maragoli were already trading with other people in the area like the Nandi and the Maasai. Some Luo words were acquired from the Maragoli.

== History ==
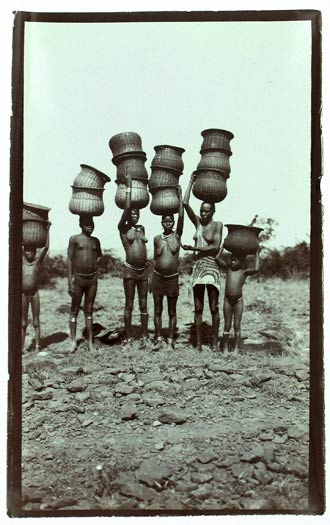
Local inhabitants near Kisumu, 1911

Kisumu City is believed to be one of the oldest settlements in Kenya with historical records indicating that Kisumu was dominated by diverse communities at different times long before Europeans arrived. The people from the Nandi, Kalenjin, Kisii, Maasai, Luo and Luhya communities converged at the tip of Lake Victoria and called the place "sumo" which literally means a place of barter trade. Each community called it different names, for instance:

1. The Luo called it "Kisumo" meaning "a place to look for food" such that the Luo would say "I am going Kisuma" to mean "I am going to look for food".
2. The Abaluhya called it "Abhasuma" which means "a place to borrow food", such that the Luhya would say "I am going Khusuma" to mean "I am going to borrow food".
3. The Abagusii called it "egesumu" meaning "a structure for keeping/rearing chicken". It is believed the Abagusii were in Kisumu but found Kisumu was not good for crop husbandry and agriculture.
4. The Nandi called it "Kisumett" which means a place where food was found during times of scarcity and exchange, which cannot be attacked by Nandi and Terik irrespective of any issue.
5. Industries are centred on processing agricultural products, brewing, and textile manufacturing. Asians once constituted more than one-fourth of the population, but declined after independence in 1963.

Kisumu was identified by the British explorers in early 1898 as an alternative railway terminus and port for the Uganda Railway, then under construction. It was to replace Port Victoria, then an important centre on the caravan trade route, near the delta of the Nzoia River. Kisumu was ideally located on the shores of Lake Victoria at the cusp of the Winam Gulf, at the end of the caravan trail from Pemba, Mombasa, and Malindi and had the potential for connections to the whole of the Lake region via steam ships. In July 1899, the first skeleton plan for Kisumu was prepared. This included landing places and wharves along the northern lakeshore, near the present-day Airport Road. Demarcations for government buildings and retail shops were also included in the plan.

Another plan was later prepared in May 1900, when plots were allocated to a few European firms as well as to Indian traders who had travelled to Kisumu on contracts to build the Uganda Railway and had decided to settle at the expanding terminus. A later plan included a flying boat jetty (now used by the Fisheries Department). In October 1900, the 62-ton ship SS William Mackinnon was reassembled and registered in Kisumu, and made its maiden voyage to Entebbe, marking the beginning of the Lake Marine Services. The SS Winifred (1901) and the SS Sybil (1901) were later added to the fleet in 1902 and 1904, respectively. On Friday, 20 December 1901, the railway line reached the Kisumu pier, adopting a new name, Port Florence.

By February 1903, the railway line had been opened for goods and passenger transportation. Kisumu was also privileged to host the first flight in Kenya; the current police workshop was the first hangar in Kenya. Before the jet airline era, the city was a landing point on the British flying boat passenger and mail route from Southampton to Cape Town. Kisumu also linked Port Bell to Nairobi. In the meantime, it was realised that the site originally chosen for the township north of the Nyanza Gulf was unsuitable for the town's expansion, due to its flat topography and poor soils. An alternative site was therefore identified and the town's location moved to the ridge on the southern shore of the Gulf, where the town is today. Consequently, another plan was prepared in 1902, which provided the basic layout of the new town on the southern ridge. This was followed by the construction of a number of government buildings, notably the former Provincial Commissioner's Office (now State Lodge) and the Old Prison (now earmarked for the construction of an Anglican cathedral).

In 1903, the township boundaries were gazetted and some 4,900 ha (12,000 acres), including water, set aside for its development. The new township reverted to its original name, Kisumu, in substitution for Port Florence. At this time, there was an 'Old Kisumu' that consisted of two rows of stalls (Dukas) on Mumias Road, north of the Gulf. It was demolished in the twenties when new plots became available on Odera and Ogada Streets in the present-day Kisumu, hence the new area acquired the name 'New Bazaar'. Winston Churchill visited Kisumu in 1907.

By the 1930s and 40s, the city had become a leading centre for commerce, administrative and military installations. In the 1960s the population of Asians in relation to locals was significantly higher. The town was elevated to the status of a municipal board in 1940 and later to a municipal council in 1960. In the early sixties, very little development took place in Kisumu, with an acute shortage in housing, shops and offices. The situation was made worse by the influx of locals into the town following the declaration of independence in 1963.

The city's growth and prosperity slowed down temporarily in 1977, as a result of the collapse of the East African Community. However, the city spurred with the reformation of the community in 1996 and with its designation as a "city". The port has been stimulated by the transformation of international business and trade, as well as the shipments of goods destined for Uganda, Tanzania, Burundi, Rwanda and the Democratic Republic of Congo.

Currently, Kisumu is one of the fastest-growing cities in Kenya. It is thriving with the sugar and rice irrigation industries, whose contribution to the national economy is immense due to its natural resources and as the epicentre for business in Kenya.

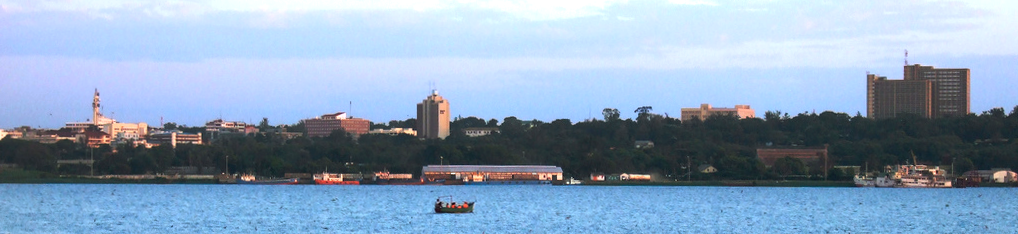
Kisumu panorama, viewed from Lake Victoria

== Culture and languages ==
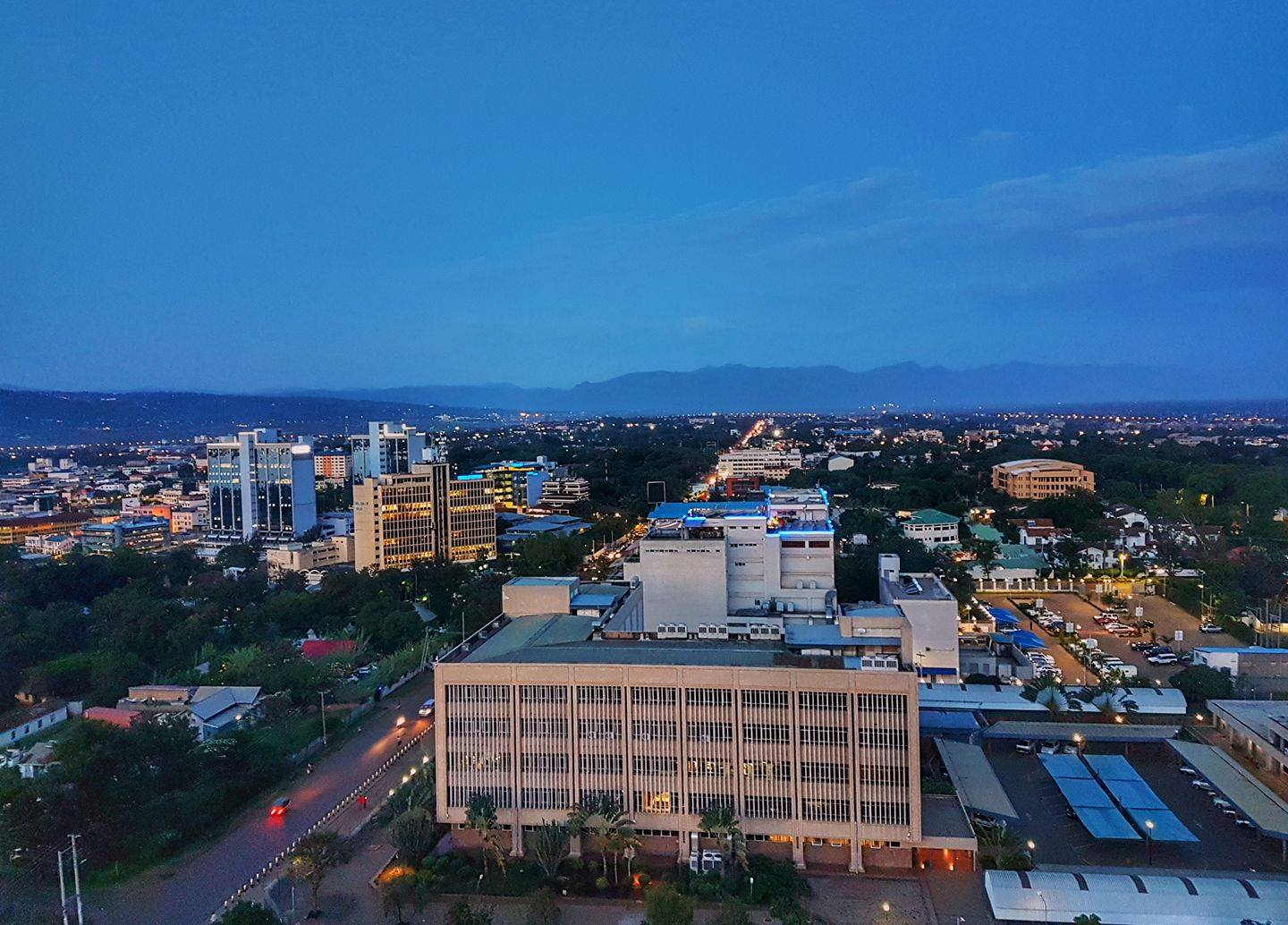

English is one of two official languages of Kenya, the other being Kiswahili. Most people in Kisumu are trilingual and are also fluent in Dholuo, the local language of the Luo, Kenya's fourth-largest ethnic group, to which 90% of Kisumu residents belong. Due to its growth since the advent of devolution, there has been a recent increase in other local ethnic groups within the city.

== Climate ==
Kisumu features a tropical rainforest climate with no true dry season and significant rainfall year-round. January is the driest month while the month of April receives the most rainfall. The average temperature is 22.9 °C.

Climate data for Kisumu (Kisumu International Airport), elevation 1,146 m (3,760 ft), (1991–2020 normals)
| Month | Jan | Feb | Mar | Apr | May | Jun | Jul | Aug | Sep | Oct | Nov | Dec | Year |
|---|---|---|---|---|---|---|---|---|---|---|---|---|---|
| Mean daily maximum °C (°F) | 29.8 (85.6) | 30.2 (86.4) | 30.1 (86.2) | 28.3 (82.9) | 27.7 (81.9) | 27.6 (81.7) | 27.7 (81.9) | 28.1 (82.6) | 29.2 (84.6) | 29.4 (84.9) | 28.8 (83.8) | 29.2 (84.6) | 28.8 (83.9) |
| Daily mean °C (°F) | 24.3 (75.7) | 24.4 (75.9) | 24.5 (76.1) | 23.7 (74.7) | 23.2 (73.8) | 22.9 (73.2) | 22.7 (72.9) | 22.9 (73.2) | 23.4 (74.1) | 23.9 (75.0) | 23.8 (74.8) | 23.7 (74.7) | 23.6 (74.5) |
| Mean daily minimum °C (°F) | 18.7 (65.7) | 18.6 (65.5) | 18.8 (65.8) | 19.1 (66.4) | 18.6 (65.5) | 18.1 (64.6) | 17.7 (63.9) | 17.6 (63.7) | 17.7 (63.9) | 18.3 (64.9) | 18.9 (66.0) | 18.2 (64.8) | 18.4 (65.1) |
| Average precipitation mm (inches) | 79 (3.1) | 84 (3.3) | 169 (6.7) | 213 (8.4) | 167 (6.6) | 85 (3.3) | 85 (3.3) | 81 (3.2) | 90 (3.5) | 95 (3.7) | 139 (5.5) | 101 (4.0) | 1,388 (54.6) |
| Average precipitation days (≥ 1.0 mm) | 7 | 10 | 11 | 17 | 13 | 8 | 7 | 8 | 8 | 10 | 13 | 9 | 121 |
| Average relative humidity (%) | 56.4 | 51.9 | 67.8 | 75.0 | 76.1 | 73.3 | 69.9 | 69.1 | 68.5 | 68.4 | 71.2 | 68.2 | 68.0 |
Source 1: World Meteorological Organization (precipitation 1938–1990)
Source 2: IEM

== Agriculture ==
Kisumu has highly fertile land and variations in temperature and rainfall with two rainy seasons per year across the region provide a suitable environment for a broad range of agricultural crops. The Kisumu region has approximately 1.6 million hectares of agricultural land. However, it is estimated that only 58 percent of the land is currently used. The majority of farming in the lake basin region is subsistence agriculture, leading to relatively low production volumes. Current crop yields are considered to be significantly lower than the potential afforded by soil and climate conditions. Current low land utilisation and yields are driven by the lack of guaranteed markets and associated support services. Like agriculture, livestock farming is currently performed primarily on a subsistence basis. Cattle are predominantly indigenous breeds with lower milk output than grade cattle.

=== Aquaculture ===
The Kenyan part of Lake Victoria covers approximately 400,000 hectares (4,100 square kilometres), with 550 kilometres (342 mi) of lake shoreline; most of this shoreline is under-used.

== Points of interest ==
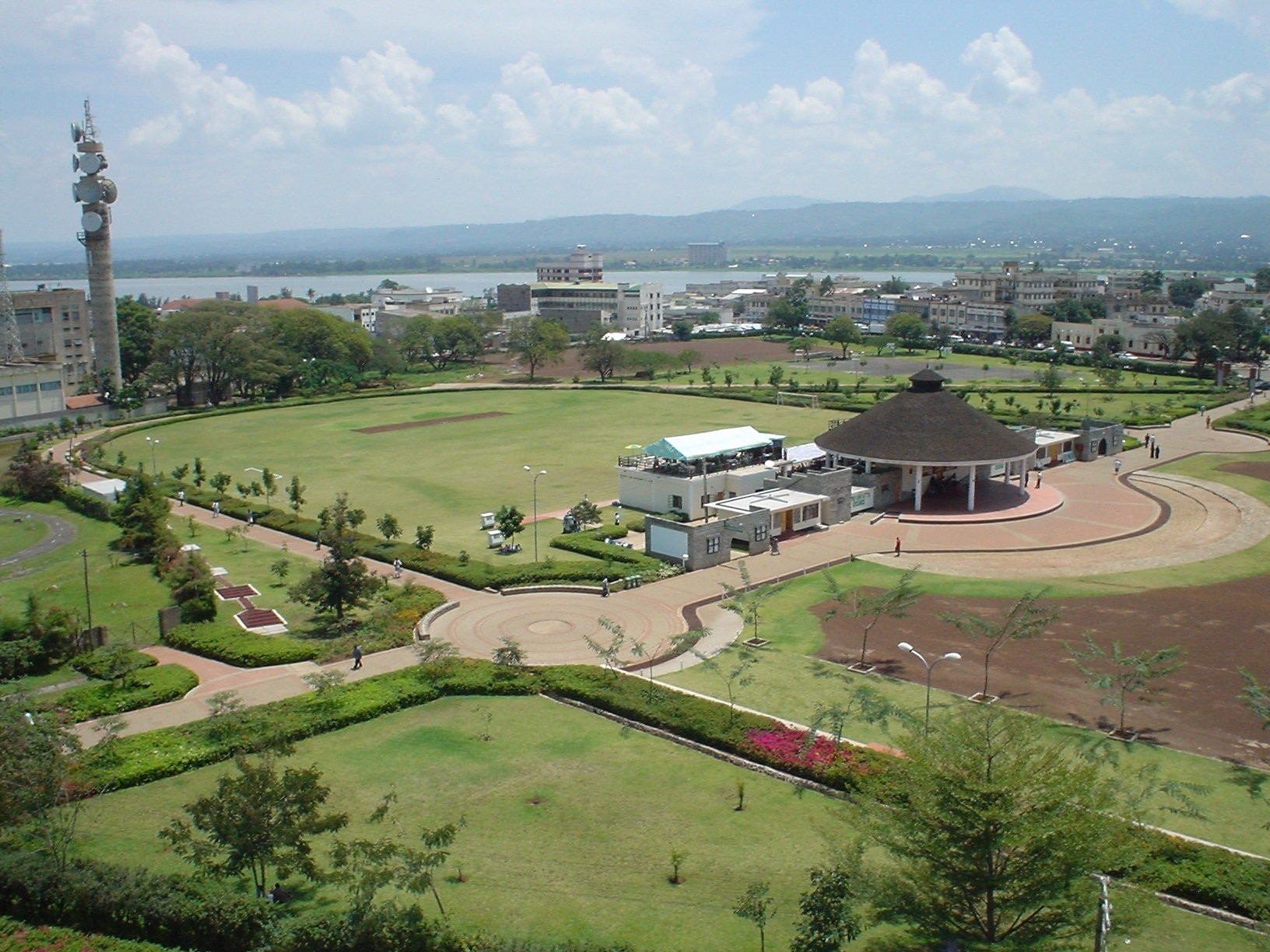
Jomo Kenyatta Sports Ground

Attractions in the city include Kibuye Market, Oile Market, the Kisumu Museum, an impala sanctuary, a bird sanctuary, Hippo Point, shopping malls and the nearby Kit Mikaye and Ndere Island National Park. Although Kisumu has modernized over the years, it still maintains an old town feel, especially on the outskirts, and the culture is still very ingrained.

=== Town Clock ===
On the main street of Kisumu city, Oginga Odinga Road, a tall town clock stands in the middle of the road. It was unveiled on 19 August 1938 by the then Governor of Kenya Sir Robert Brooke-Popham. The town clock was built in memory of Kassim Lakha, who arrived in East Africa in 1871 and died in Kampala in 1910. It was erected by his sons Mohamed, Alibhai, Hassan and Rahimtulla Kassim, as the inscription on the Town Clock reads.

=== Kisumu Museum ===
Kisumu Museum, established in 1980, has a series of outdoor pavilions laid out in a formation similar to that of a Luo homestead. Some of the pavilions contain live animals. For example, one pavilion contains numerous aquaria with a wide variety of fish from Lake Victoria, along with explanatory posters. Another pavilion contains a terrarium containing mambas, spitting cobras, puff adders and other venomous Kenyan snakes. Outside, the museum has a few additional exhibits, including a snake pit and a crocodile container.

Other pavilions show weaponry, jewellery, farm tools and other artefacts of the various peoples of Nyanza Province. Additionally, there are exhibits of stuffed animals, birds and fish. One pavilion houses the prehistoric TARA rock art, which was removed for its own protection to the museum after it was defaced by graffiti in its original location.

The museum's most important and largest exhibition is the UNESCO-sponsored Ber-gi-dala. This is a full-scale recreation of a traditional Luo homestead. Ber-gi-dala consists of the home, granaries and livestock corrals of an imaginary Luo man as well as the homes of each of his three wives and his eldest son. Through signs and taped programs in both Luo and English, the exhibition also explains the origins of the Luo people, their migration to western Kenya, traditional healing plants, and the process of establishing a new home.

=== Dunga Beach and Wetland ===
Dunga Beach and Wetland is known for its biodiversity and its cultural rich and diverse papyrus wetland ecosystem and local community respectively. Ecofinder Kenya has established Dunga Wetland Pedagogical Centre at Dunga Beach, a grass-roots led intervention whose cardinal goal is the empowerment of the Dunga Wetland community and improvement of the livelihood security of its people. Therefore, some of the main focuses in the centre are promoting eco-cultural tourism and facilitating the conservation of the Dunga Papyrus Wetland Ecosystem.

=== Kisumu Impala Sanctuary ===
Kisumu is the location of the Kisumu Impala Sanctuary. During British rule, the Impala Park sanctuary was called Connaught Parade. Measuring just 1 square kilometre (0.39 sq mi), the sanctuary is one of Kenya's smallest wildlife preserves. As its name suggests, it is home to a herd of impala, some hippos, and many reptiles and birds. Additionally, several baboons (monkeys) and leopards who faced difficulties in the wild are housed in cages. Over 115 different species of birds live there.

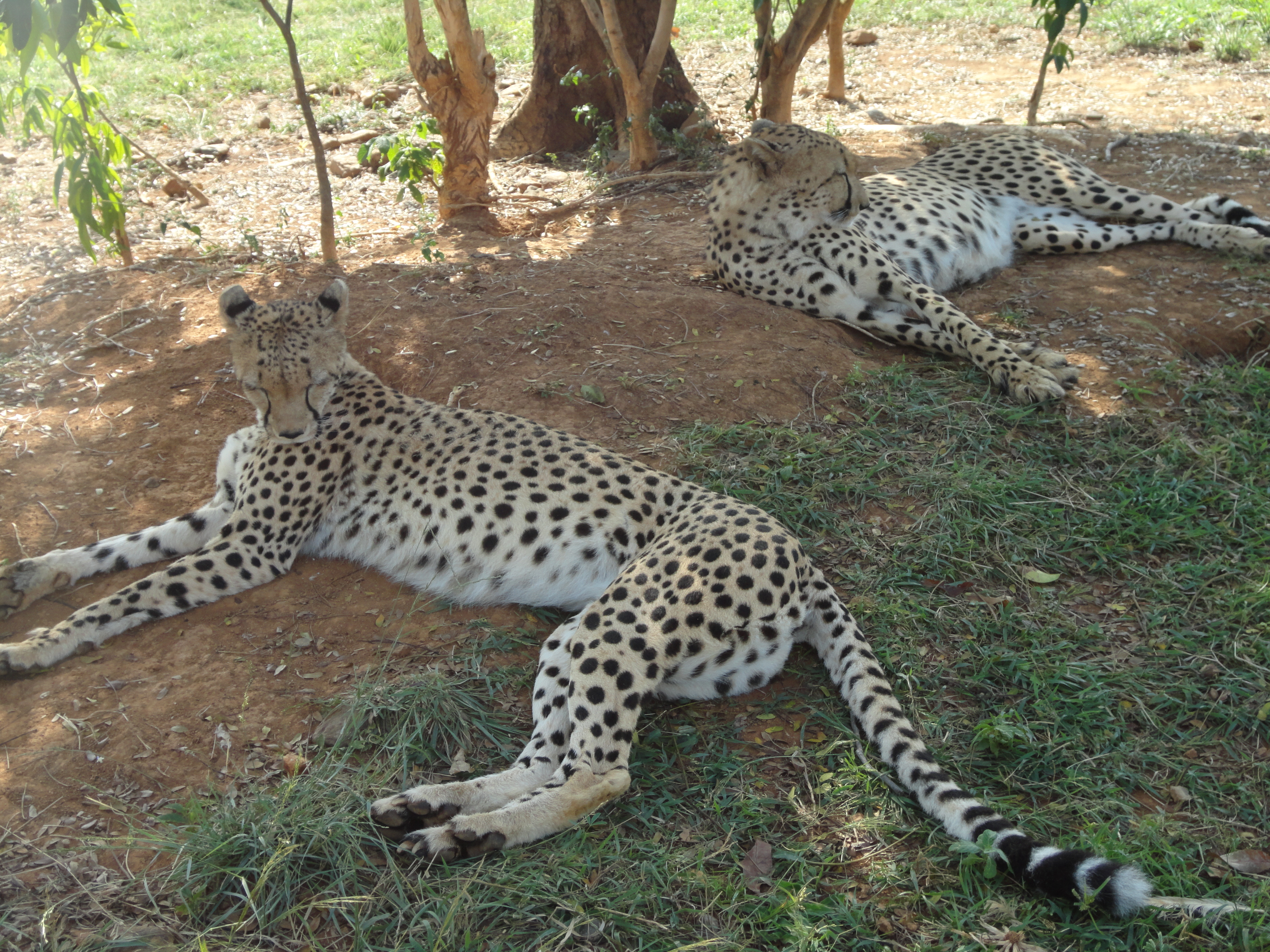
Cheetahs at the Impala Sanctuary

=== Hippo Point ===
Hippo Point is a 240 ha (590 acres) viewing area on Lake Victoria. Despite its name, it is better known as a viewing point for its unobstructed sunsets over the lake than for its occasional hippos. Hippo Point is located near the village of Dunga, a few kilometres southwest of the city. The village also has a fishing port and a camping site.

=== Kit Mikayi ===
Kit Mikayi, a large rock with three rocks on top, is located off Kisumu Bondo Road towards Bondo. Kit-mikayi means "Stones of the first wife" or "First Wife Rocks" in Dholuo, the Luo language. It is a weeping rock; it is believed that Mikayi (literally, "the first wife") went up the hill to the stones when her husband took a second wife and has been weeping ever since. It has become a local pilgrimage site for adherents of the Legio Maria sect who, come to the rock to pray and fast for several weeks at a time.

=== Ndere Island ===
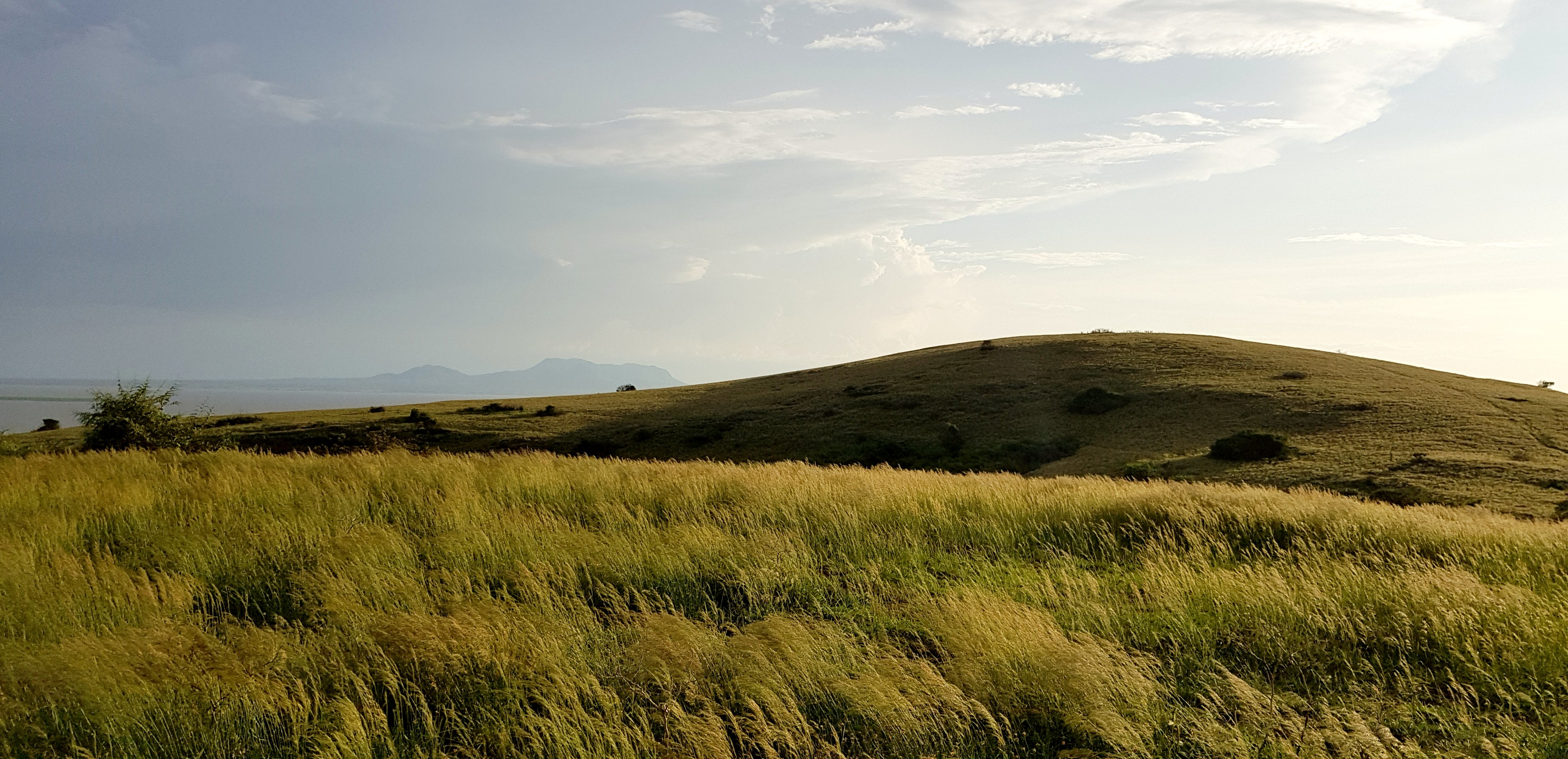
Ndere Island

Ndere Island is a small island 4.2 square kilometres (1.6 sq mi) in the Winam Gulf of Lake Victoria. It was gazetted as the Ndere Island National Reserve in November 1986 and has since been uninhabited. It has sweeping views over the lake in a much more serene and tranquil environment than the mainland.

== Sport ==
Moi Stadium plays home to various teams such as the Kisumu All Stars and Kisumu Telkom FC. Peter Anyang' Nyong'o, the governor and father of Hollywood star Lupita Nyong'o, announced that the county will build a brand new stadium. At the same time, the country's current government has plans to build a national stadium. As of 2018, neither plan has materialized.

Kisumu is represented in the nationwide rugby league by Kisumu RFC. The city is also host to a leg of the national rugby sevens circuit, one of only six city hosts. The Kisumu leg is referred to as the Dala sevens and the annual tournament attracts thousands of fans from across the country.

Kisumu is represented in the Kenya Basketball Federation League by Kisumu Lakeside which plays its home games at Jomo Kenyatta Sports Grounds.

== Transport ==
=== Air ===
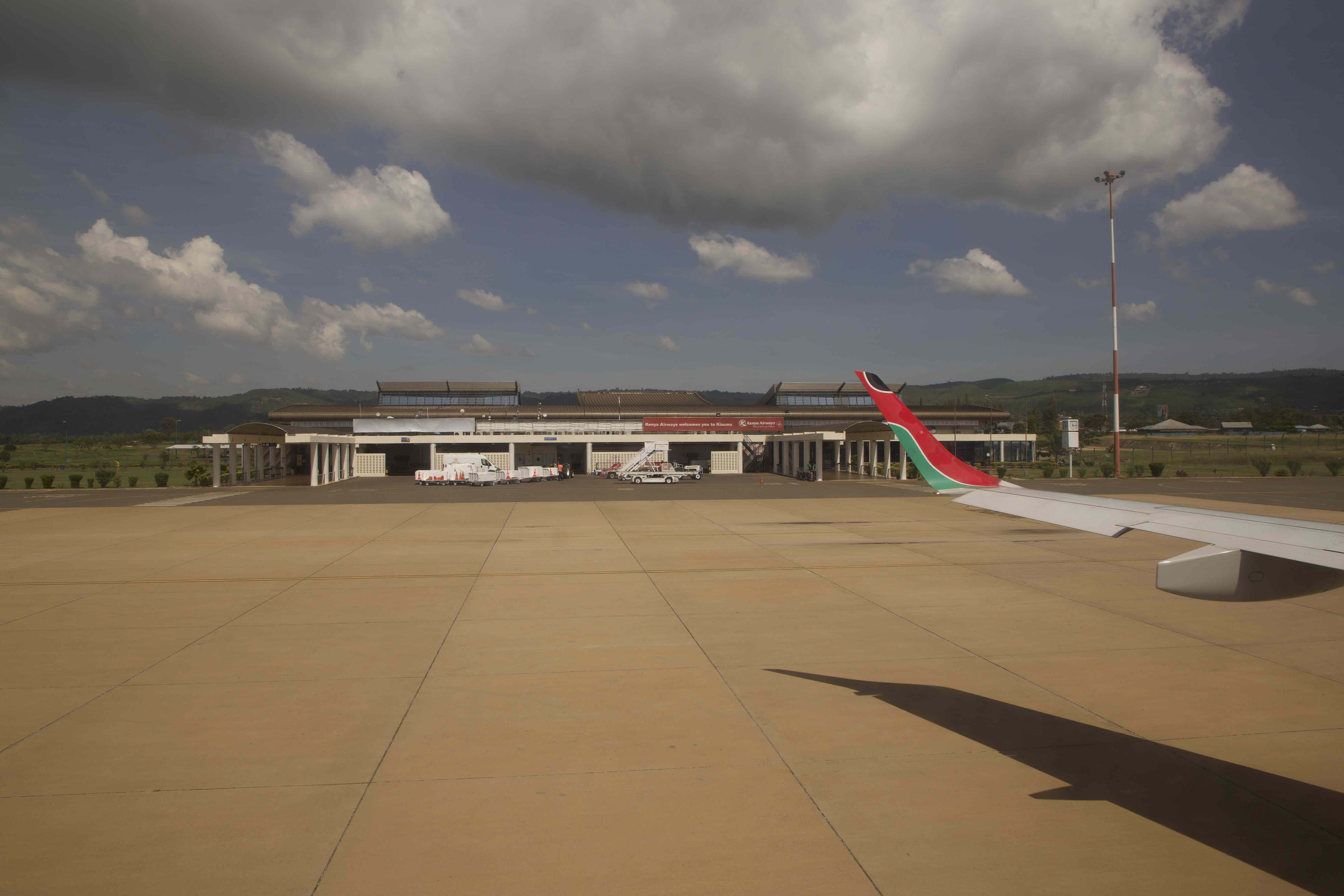
Kisumu International Airport

Before the jet airline era, Kisumu was a landing point on the British flying boat passenger and mail route from Southampton to Cape Town. Kisumu linked Port Bell and Nairobi.

Kisumu is served by Kisumu International Airport which has international status, with regular daily flights to Nairobi and Mombasa. Expansion of the airport cargo facility after completion of the passenger terminals is currently going on in anticipation of increased trade brought about by the recreated East African Community of Kenya, Tanzania and Uganda.

=== Water ===
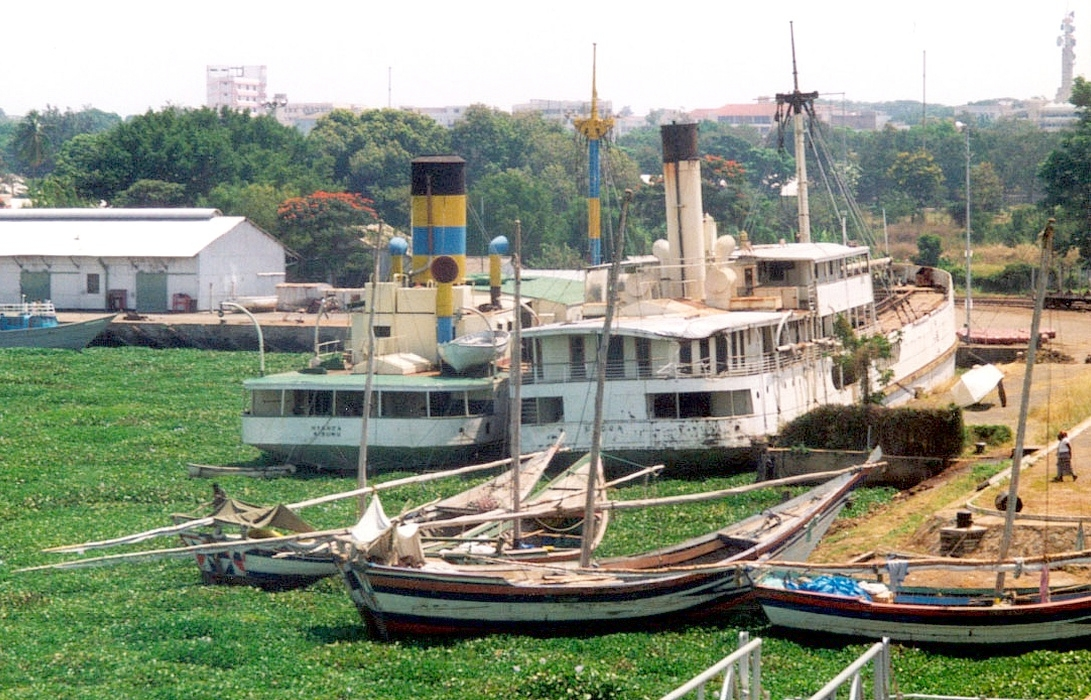
Kisumu Harbour. The green vegetation is water hyacinth.

Lake Victoria ferries have operated from the port linking the railway to Mwanza and Bukoba in Tanzania, and to Entebbe, Port Bell, and Jinja in Uganda. The first steamships built in Kisumu in 1905 were the SS Sybilla and the SS Nyanza.

=== Rail ===
The Uganda Railway from the port of Mombasa reached Kisumu in 1901. Until 2013 passenger trains operate between Nairobi and Kisumu using the revamped meter gauge rail run by the defunct Rift Valley Railways. A standard gauge railway from Nairobi to Naivasha was opened up to Suswa in 2019. A second section of 262 kilometres (163 mi) should have brought the standard gauge to Kisumu, a new station and a port on Lake Victoria being planned. The plans not materialising due to lack of funding, a project to rebuild the metre gauge line from the Ugandan capital Kampala to the frontier and onwards to the existing Kenyan metre gauge railway past Kisumu found funding from the African Development Bank in 2022.

=== Road ===
Former president Mwai Kibaki launched a Ksh. 6.8 billion road project for a major overhaul of Kisumu's road network on 24 July 2009. The city is connected to the cities of Nakuru, Nairobi and Mombasa via the A104 highway and to the city of Eldoret via the B1 highway. A 450 kilometres (280 mi) Lake Victoria ring road along the shores of the lake is currently under construction and will pass by the city.

=== Rail and air accidents ===
During World War II, three aircraft operated by the South African Air Force crashed into Lake Victoria soon after take-off from Kisumu Airport. The first, a Lockheed Lodestar aircraft number "K"-248 (ex ZS-ATK) carrying a senior South African military officer, Major General Dan Pienaar, crashed on 19 December 1942, killing all 12 persons on board. The other two crashes involved Douglas C-47 planes; the first on 11 May 1945 (one fatality) and the second exactly three months later, on 11 July 1945 (28 fatalities). The bodies from the two earlier accidents were repatriated to South Africa, those from the third accident are buried in the Kisumu war-graves cemetery. The cause of the accidents is currently thought to have been the katabatic wind condition which often affects Kisumu in the early morning.

Two serious railway accidents occurred near Kisumu in the 2000s.

The first took place outside Kisumu on 15 August 2000. The brakes on the train failed, causing it to roll. Thirteen people were killed and 37 received injuries. The second took place on the morning of 16 October 2005, when a matatu (taxi minibus) was struck by a passenger train. Six people died and 23 more were injured.

After that there have been accidents in its major towns with notable black spots: Ojola/Kisian, Kisat bridge, Ahero, Sondu, Awasi just to mention a few. The Busia-Kisumu highway is becoming increasingly congested, posing risks to road users. The County Government of Kisumu has been urged to consider dualizing the roads to prevent accidents that have claimed numerous lives and caused lasting physical and psychological harm to motorists and pedestrians.

== Education ==
=== Primary education ===
Kisumu has a variety of schools to choose from, both public and private, including:

- Aga Khan Primary School, a well-known private primary school within the city.
- Obwolo Primary School is a public co-educational day primary school located in Kajulu ward, Winam Division.

=== Higher education ===
Kisumu is home to many universities and colleges. Notable among them are:

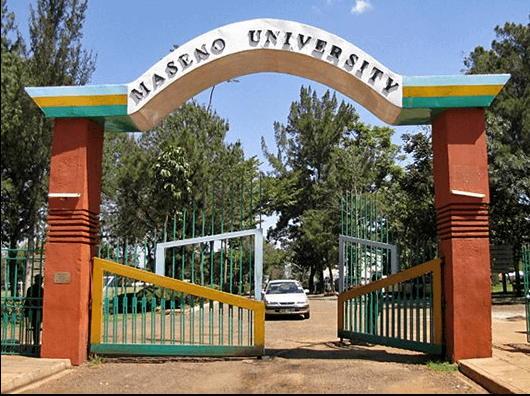
Maseno University

- Maseno University
- Jaramogi Oginga Odinga University of Science and Technology (JOOUST)
- Great Lakes University
- University of Nairobi-Kisumu Campus
- Catholic University of East Africa-Kisumu Campus
- Mount Kenya University

== Places of worship ==
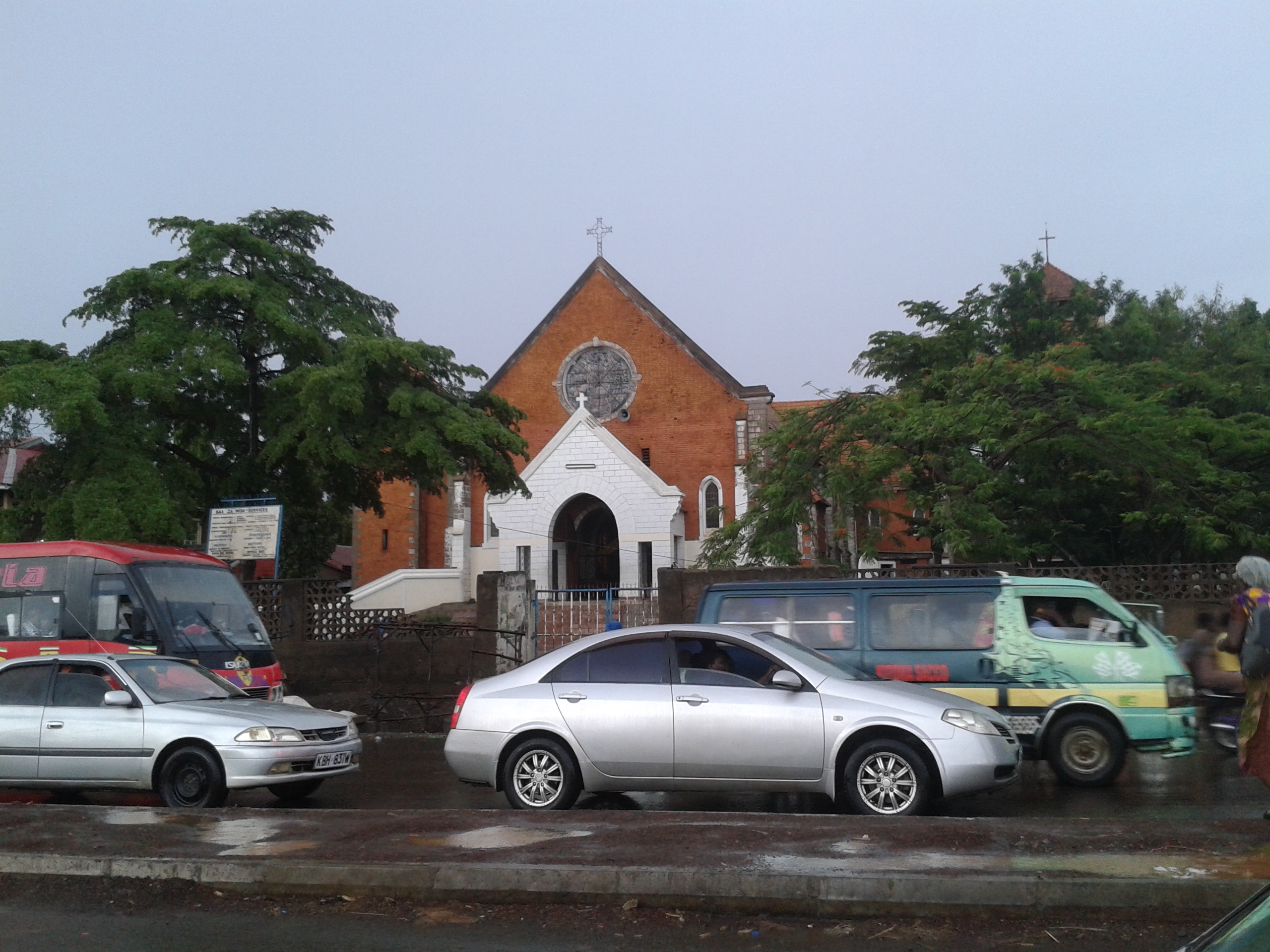
St. Therese of Lisieux Cathedral of the Roman Catholic Archdiocese of Kisumu, opposite Kibuye Market.

Among the places of worship, they are predominantly Christian churches and temples : Roman Catholic Archdiocese of Kisumu (Catholic Church), Jesus celebration centre(JCC international) Anglican Church of Kenya (Anglican Communion),((Citam Church Kisumu)) Presbyterian Church of East Africa (World Communion of Reformed Churches), Baptist Convention of Kenya (Baptist World Alliance), Assemblies of God. There are also Muslim mosques and a Hindu temple

== In popular culture ==
- The book "Kisumu" by Okang'a Ooko tells the story of the musicians of Kisumu (2018).
- Some of the events in the 2017 story "Consummation in Mombasa" (by Andrei Gusev) take place in Kisumu. The plot describes the Catholic wedding of the main characters (Russian writer Andy and Jennifer) in Mombasa and their trip to Kisumu, where Jennifer was born.
- The song "Kisumu" (by Zack Okello) talks about how Kisumu is growing (2015).

== Notable natives and residents ==
The term used to refer to a native of Kisumu is jakisumo (plural, jokisumo). Notable jokisumo include

- John Chweya, waste picker
- Jaramogi Oginga Odinga, politician, the first Vice-President of Kenya
- Raila Odinga, politician, son of Jaramogi Oginga Odinga, Kenya's former prime minister
- Robert Ouko, politician and son of Kisumu Nyahera who was abducted from his Koru, Kenya home. His charred body was found later.
- Barack Obama Sr.; Kisumu is not far from Kogelo, a village known for being the hometown of, the father to the Barack Obama.
- PinkPantheress, British singer, her mother is from Kisumu according to an interview with Nardwuar.
- Lupita Nyong’o Accomplished Academy Winning Actress and New York Times bestselling Author has her roots in the lakeside city.

== Sister cities ==
The city has "Friendship" status with Cheltenham, in the United Kingdom.

Kisumu's sister cities are Roanoke, Virginia and Boulder, Colorado, in the United States.

== Gallery ==
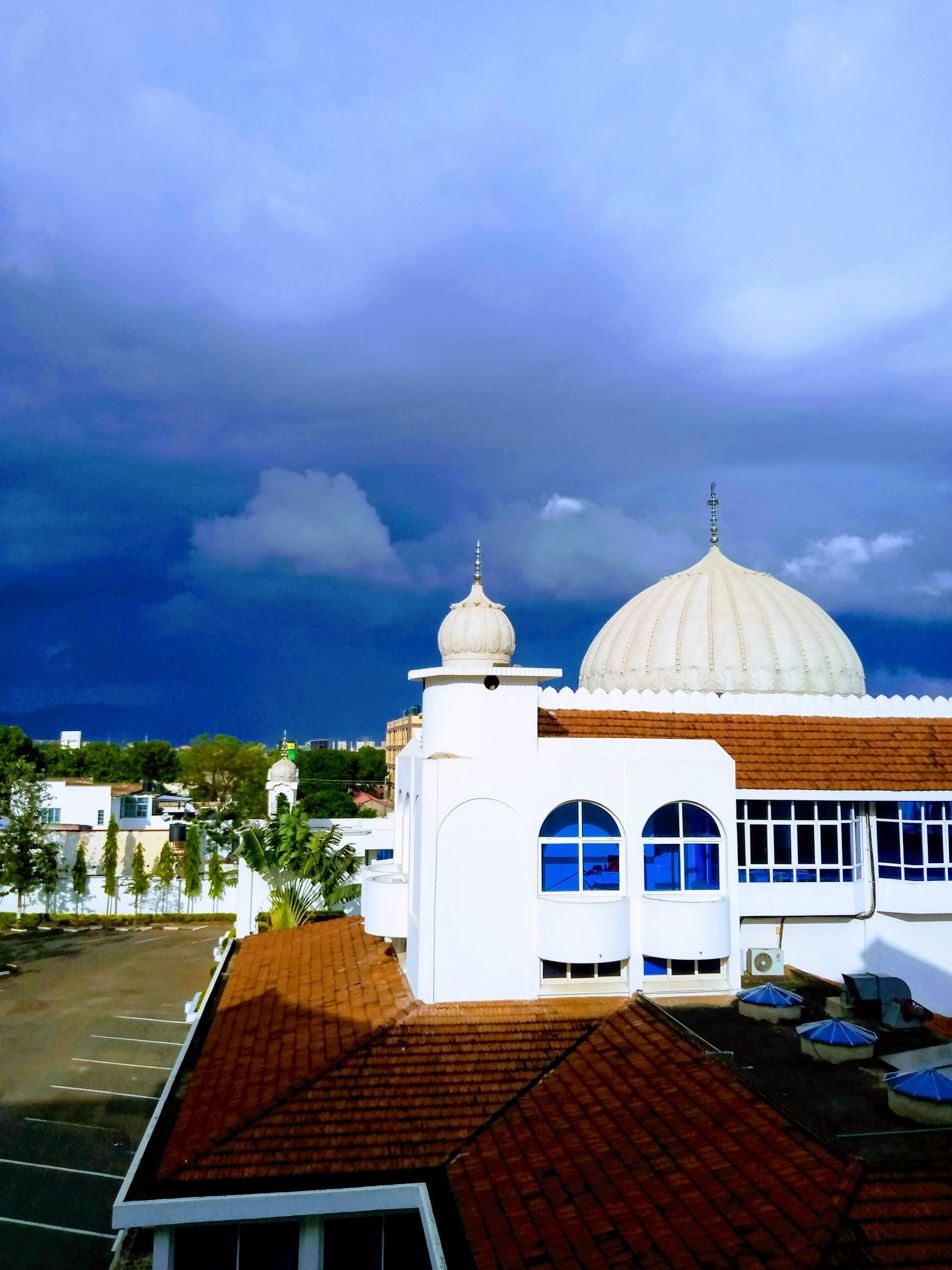
Temple in Kisumu, Kenya

Kisumu City as seen from a nearby hill

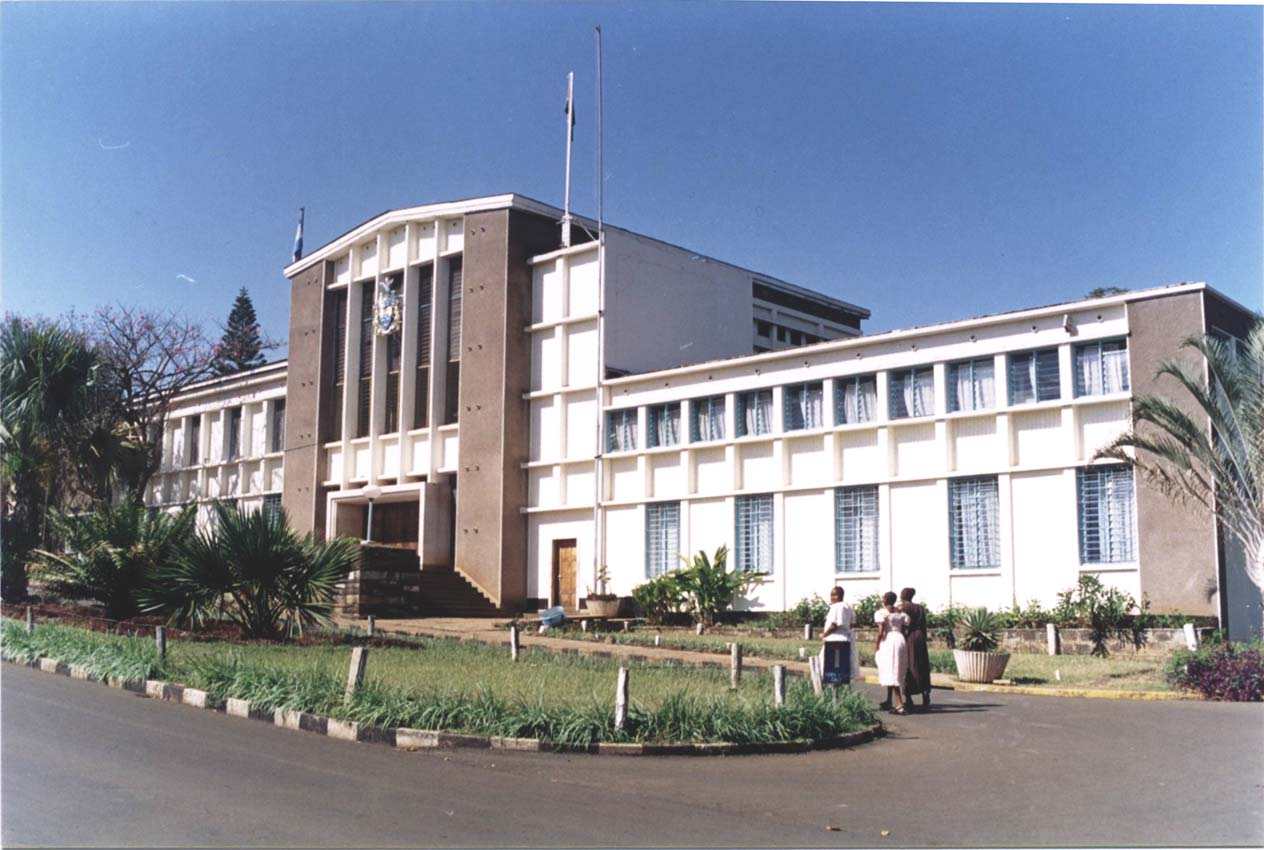
Kisumu Town Hall

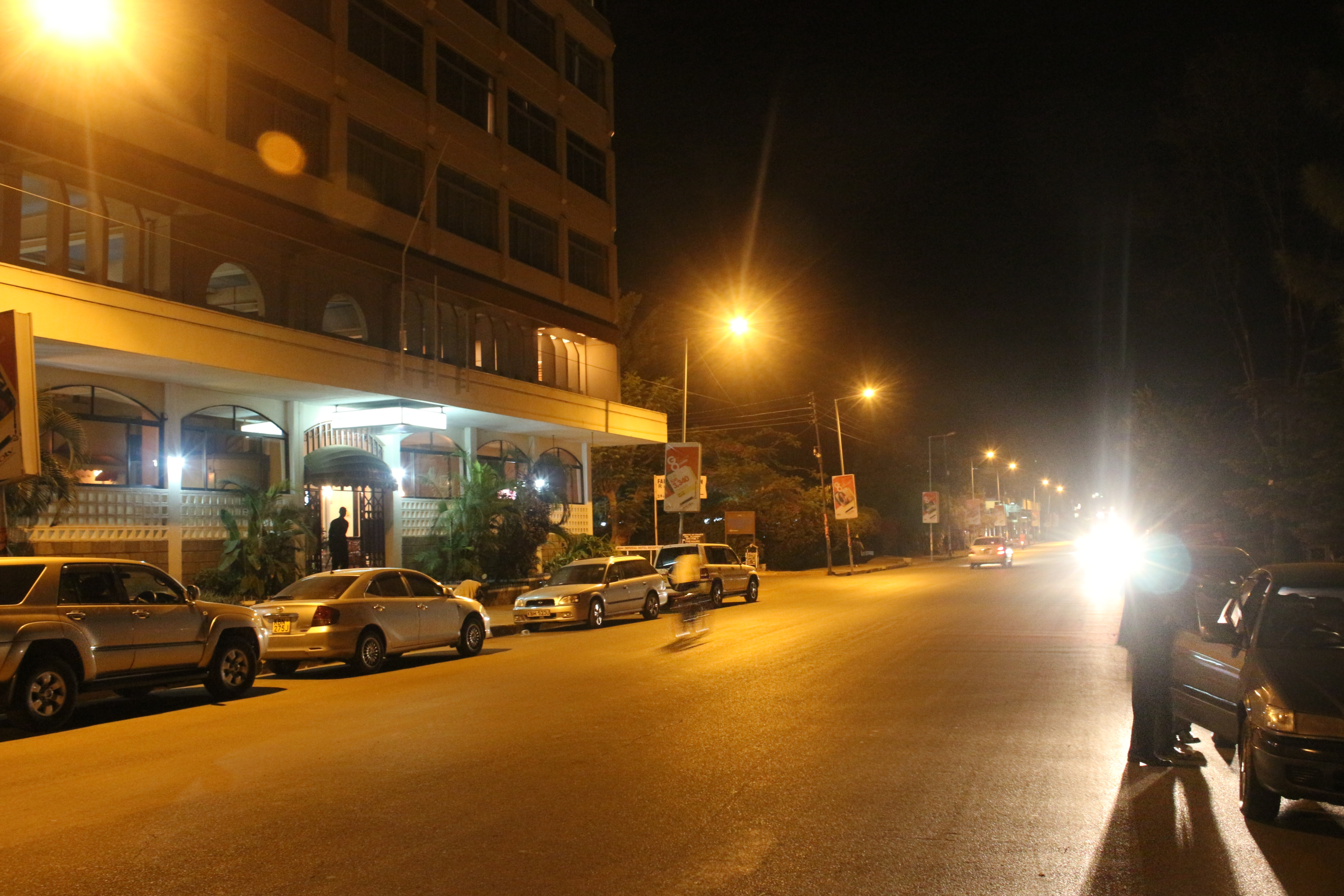
Kisumu at night

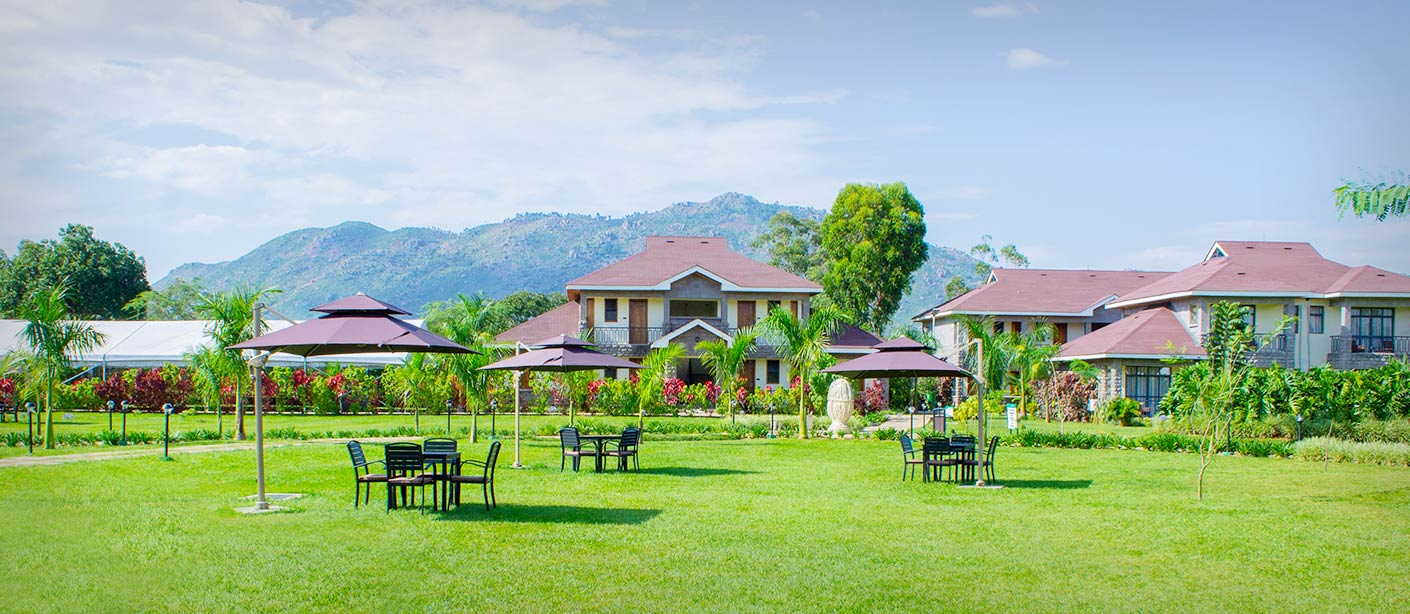
Ciala Resort

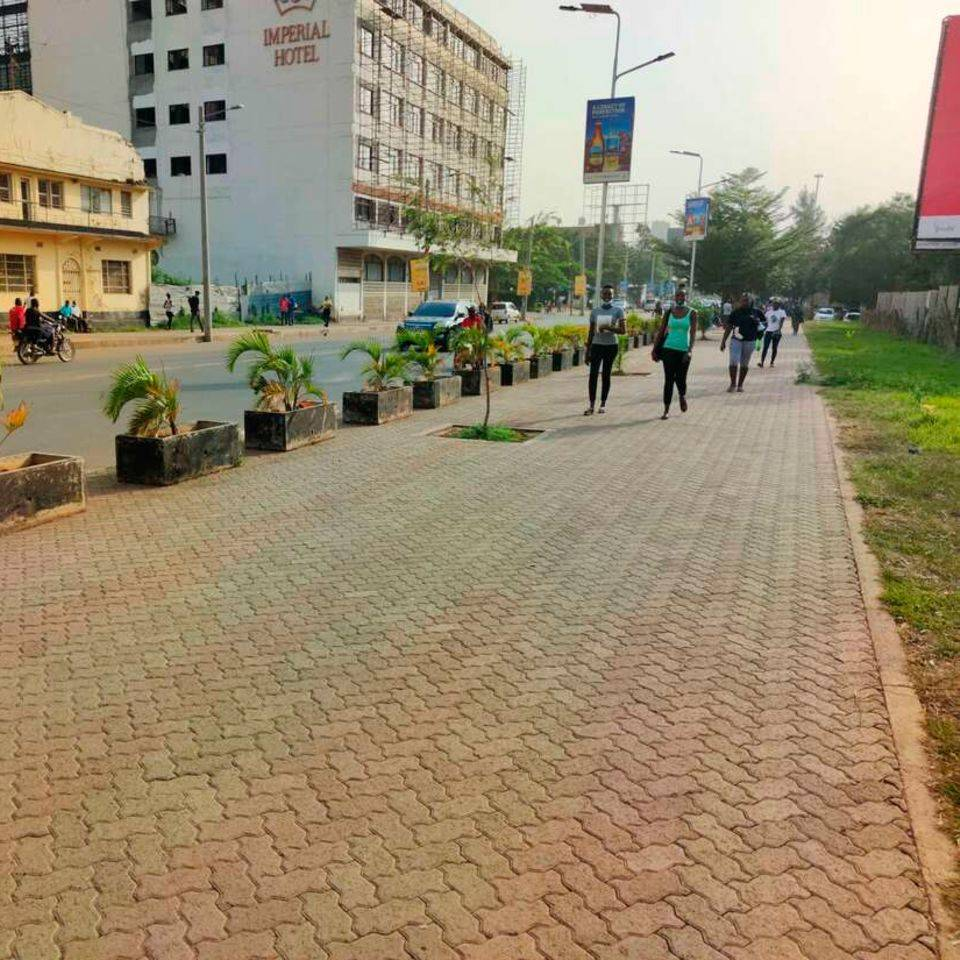
Pavement in Kisumu City
