= Winam Gulf =

Coordinates: 0°14′24″S 34°34′48″E

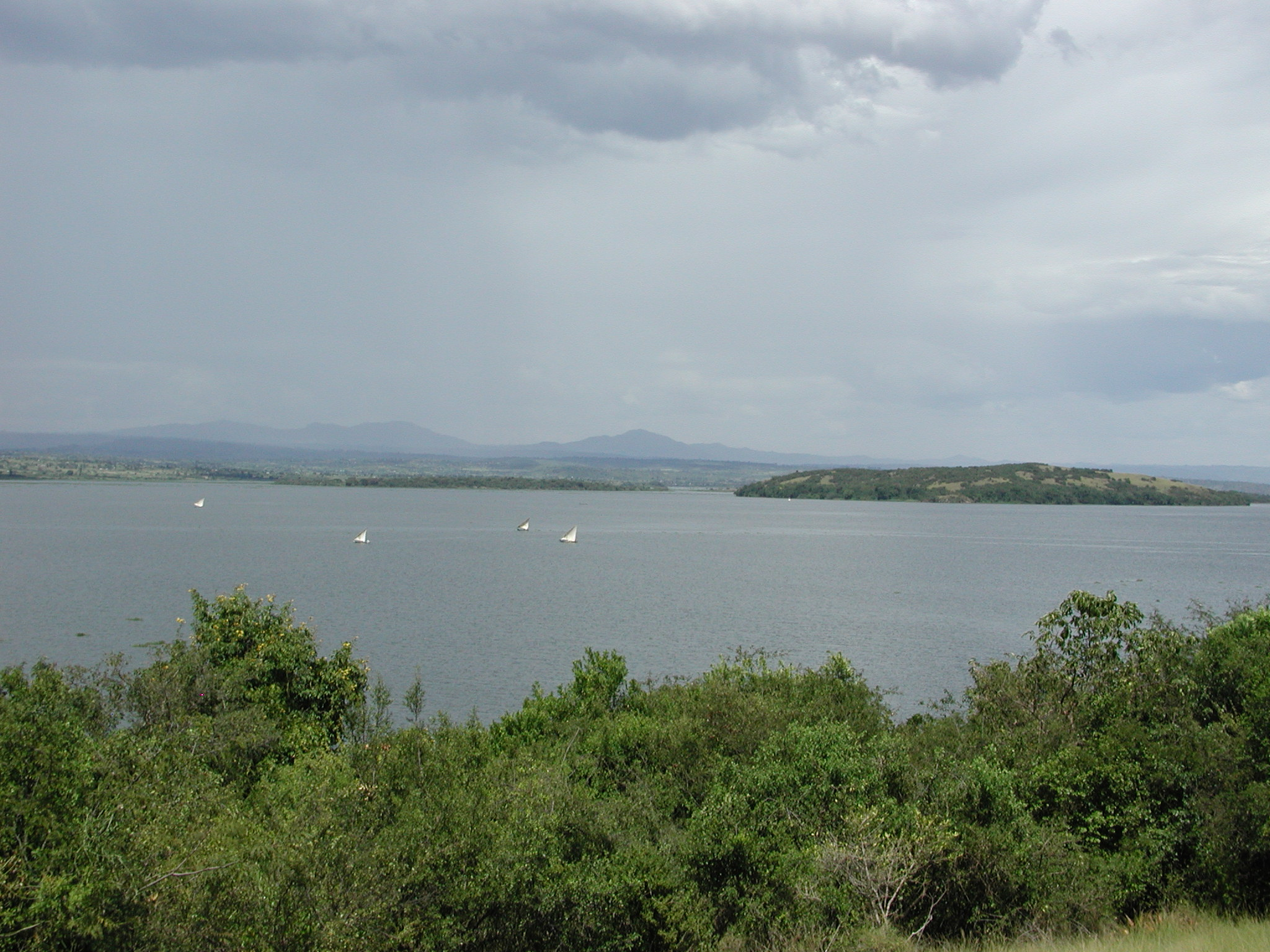
Winam Gulf, Lake Victoria, Kenya. View from atop Ndere Island, looking south.

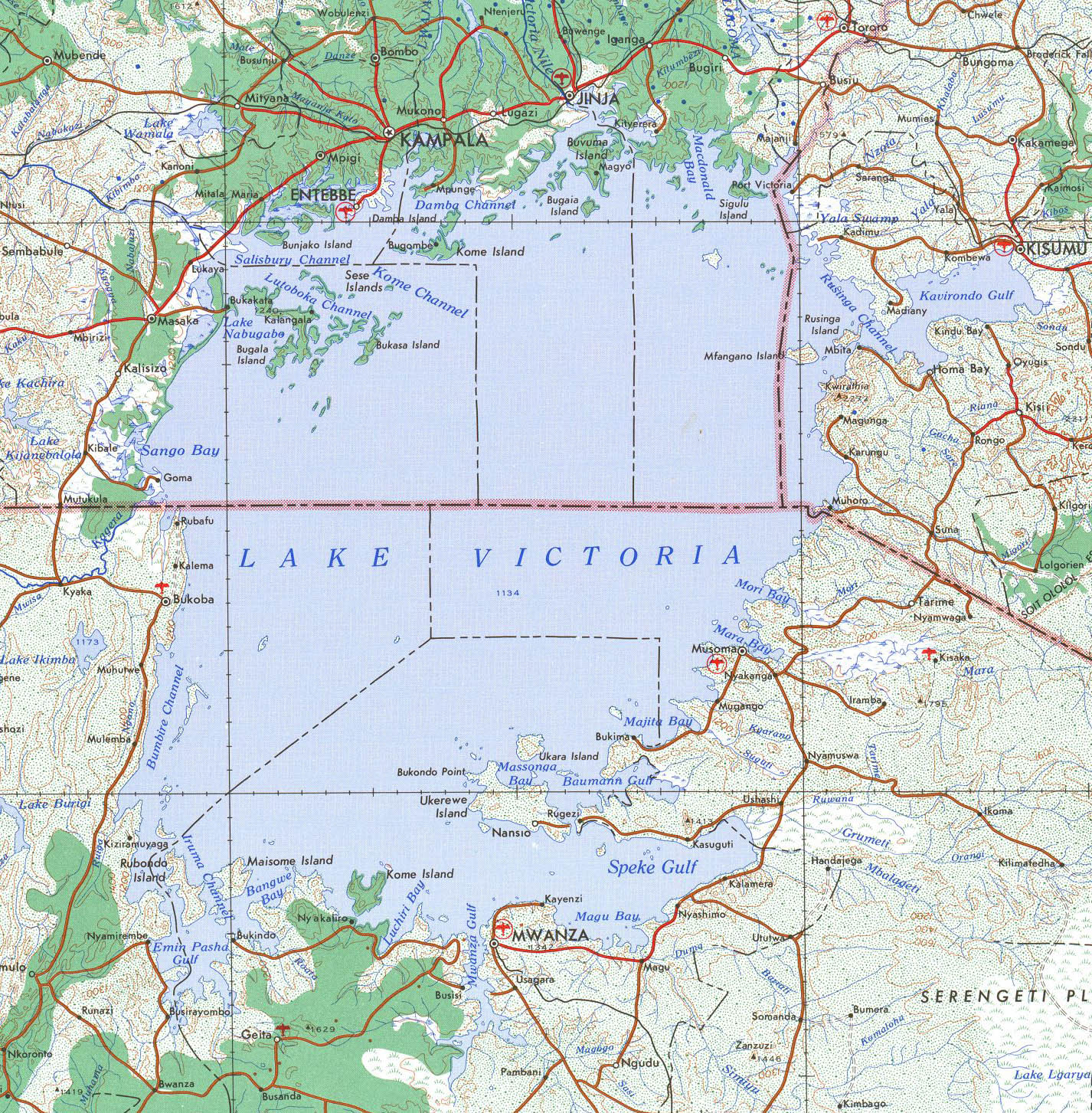
Kavirondo Gulf in the Northeast of the map of Lake Victoria

Winam Gulf is a significant extension of northeastern Lake Victoria into western Kenya. Formerly known as Kavirondo Gulf, Nyanza Gulf, and Lake Nyanza Gulf, it is a shallow inlet and is connected to the main lake by Rusinga Channel (3 mi (4.8 km) wide), which is partly masked from the main body of the lake by islands.

The port of Kisumu, Kenya's third-largest city, stands on its northeastern shore. The gulf has an average width of 25 km (16 mi) and extends for 64 km (40 mi) from Kisumu to the channel. Significant bays in the gulf include Naya Bay, Nyakach Bay, Osodo Bay, Kendu Bay, Homa Bay, Ruri Bay, Mirunda Bay, Asembo Bay, and Olambwe Bay. Islands in the gulf include Maboko, Rusinga, and Ndere Islands.
