= Charity Waciuma =

Kenyan writer (born 1936)

- Born: Charity Wanjiku Waciuma; 1936 (age 89–90)
- Occupation: Writer
- Notable work: Daughter of Mumbi (1969)

Charity Waciuma (born 1936) is a Kenyan writer, who wrote several novels for adolescents and an autobiographical novel, Daughter of Mumbi (1969). Her work draws on Kikuyu legends and storytelling traditions. In the 1960s Waciuma and Grace Ogot became the first Kenyan women writers to be published in English.

== Biography ==
Charity Wanjiku Waciuma grew up in pre-Independence Kenya, during the violent anti-colonial struggle between the Mau-Mau and British rulers. In accordance with Kikuyu naming traditions she was given her father's younger sister's name Wanjiku(one of the Gikuyu nine daughters ), her last name Waciuma, meaning "beads", being a nickname of her grandmother's father "because he had as many goats as beads in a necklace".

She became one of Kenya's pioneering writers for children with the publication in 1966 of her first book Mweru, the Ostrich Girl, which was followed by her other titles for young adults: The Golden Feather, Merry Making, and Who's Calling?. Her autobiographical work Daughter of Mumbi, published in 1969, unfolds the reactions of a sensitive Kikuyu girl to the terrible days of colonial oppression and the alarming events of the Mau Mau Emergency. The book is dedicated to Waciuma's father, who was killed during the Mau Mau Emergency.

Waciuma wrote in English hesitantly on the controversial cultural tradition of female genital excision, at a time when not all authors of African descent in the 1960s did so. Her works were published before the decolonization of Kenya, and writing on this sensitive issue was before the fight for women's rights had become prominent, and before the physical and psychological effects of that particular practice for affected women were generally acknowledged or given global attention.

Waciuma is included in the 1992 anthology Daughters of Africa, edited by Margaret Busby.

== Works ==
- Mweru, the Ostrich Girl (Nairobi: East African Publishing House, 1966)
- The Golden Feather (Nairobi: East African Publishing House, 1966)
- Daughter of Mumbi (Nairobi: Jacques Compton, 1969)
- Merry-Making (Nairobi: East African Publishing House, 1972)
- Who's Calling? (Nairobi: East African Publishing House, 1973)
