= Asembo =

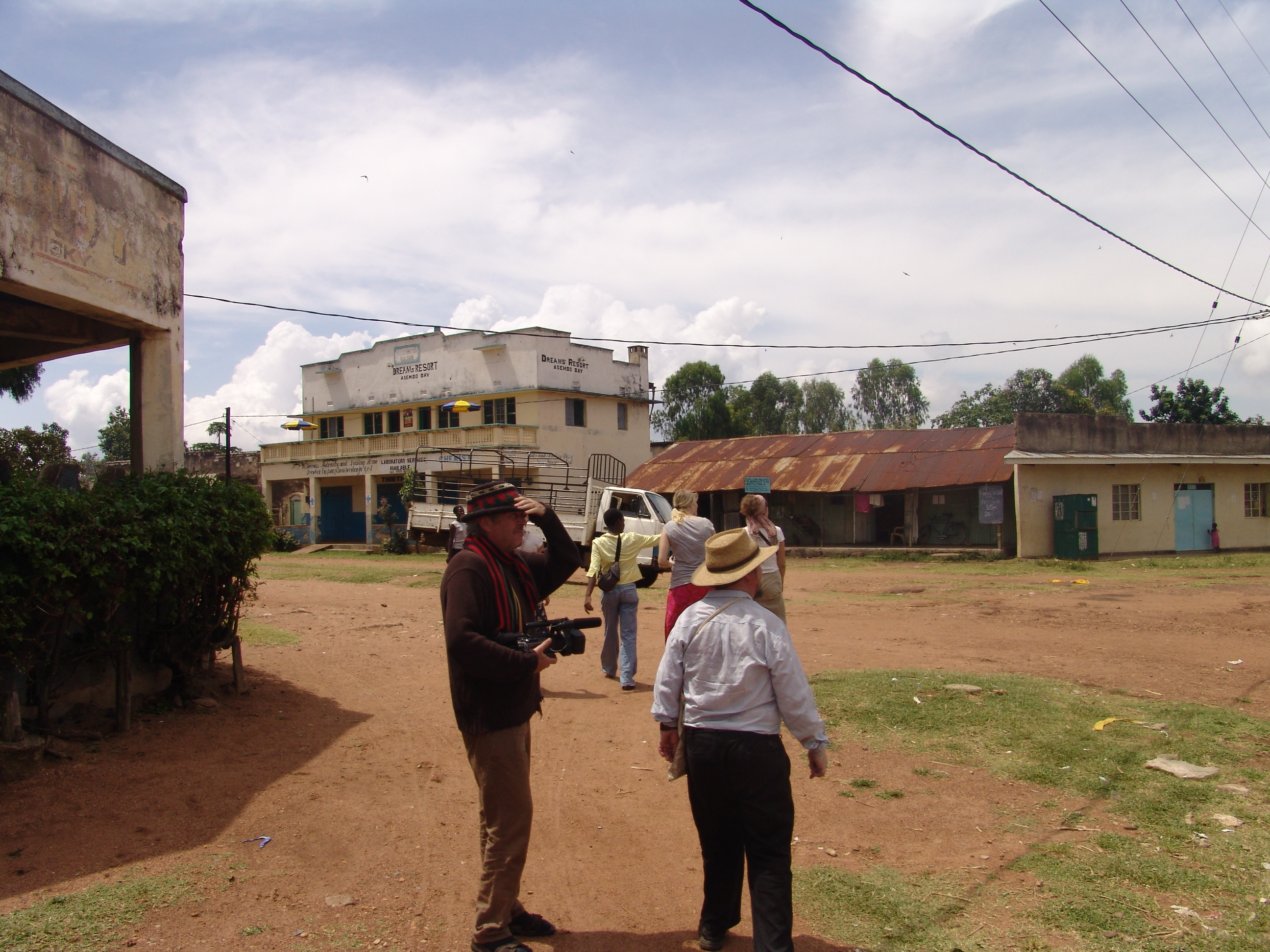

- Location within Kenya
- Coordinates: 0°10′59″S 34°23′09″E
- Country: Siaya CountyKenya
- Rarieda District: Nyanza Province
- Time zone: UTC+3 (EAT)

Asembo is a location in Kenya's Siaya County. It lies on Lake Victoria, close to the Winam Gulf. A small road connects it to the C28 highway. The bay, Asembo Bay, shares the name of the town and was once a significant port. The Asembo Bay Life Center is active in the area with humanitarian assistance.
