= Ndere Island =

National reserve in Lake Victoria in Kenya

Coordinates: 0°13′S 34°30′E

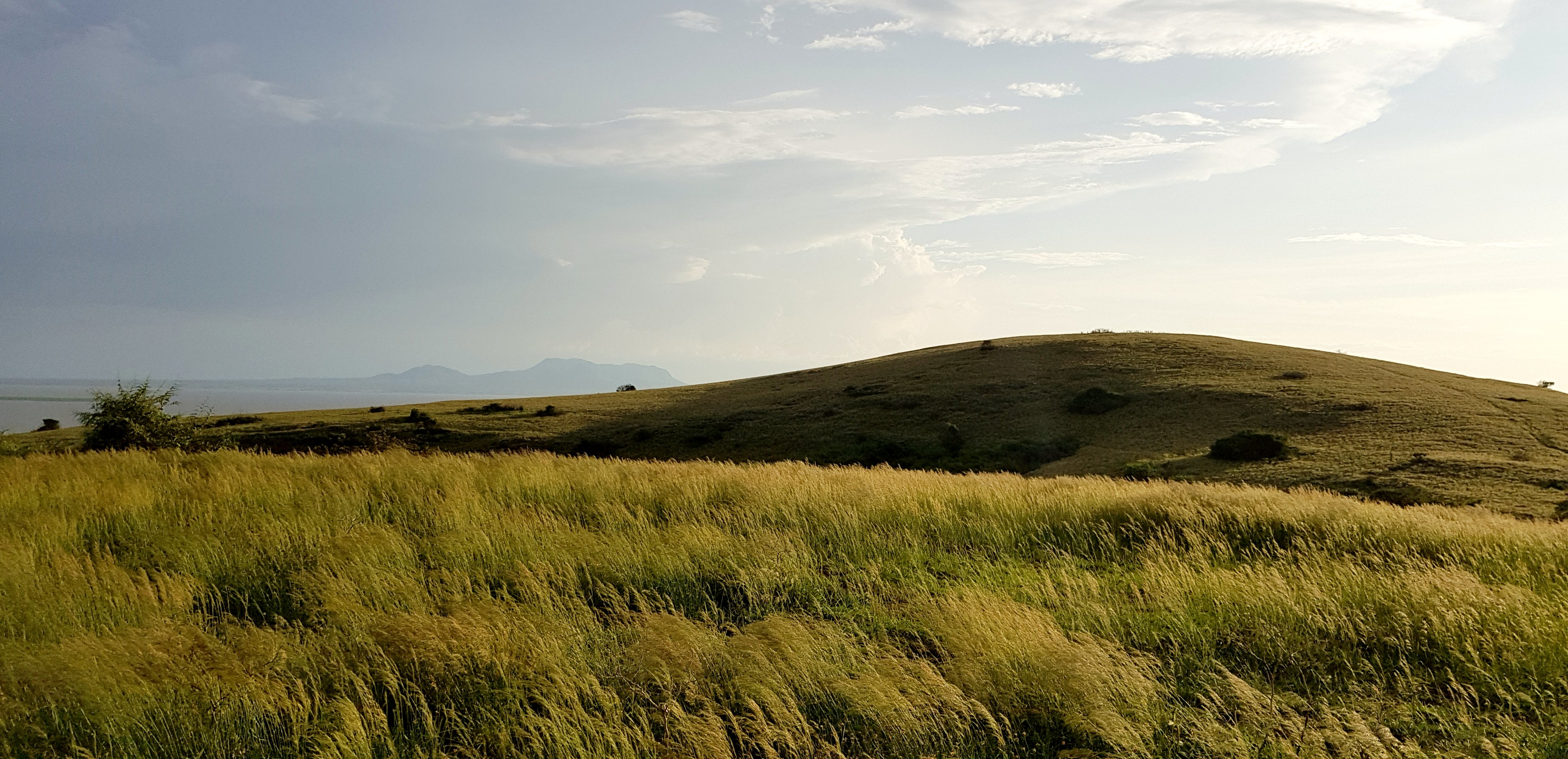
Ndere Island has sweeping views of Lake Victoria, and a remarkably serene and tranquil environment compared to the mainland.

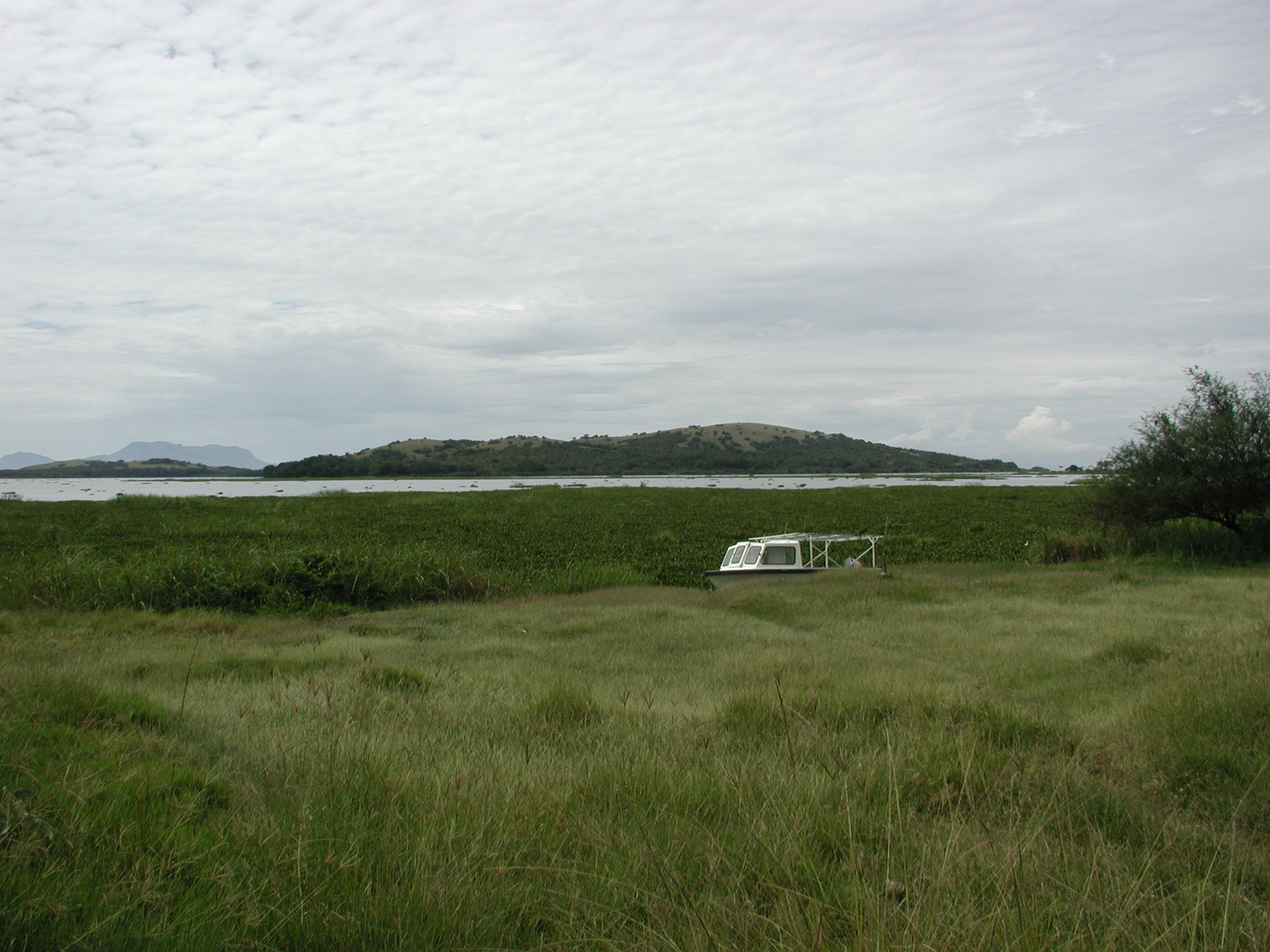
Ndere Island, Lake Victoria, Kenya. View across a hyacinth-choked lakeshore.

Ndere Island is a small island (4.2 km^{2} or 1.6 sq mi) in Winam Gulf of Lake Victoria in Kenya. It was gazetted as the Ndere Island National Reserve in November 1986 and has since that time been uninhabited.

Ndere means "meeting place" in Dholuo. According to Luo folklore, early tribal migrants rested up near Ndere after their long journey south up the Nile River Valley. They found the lush shoreline so pleasing that they stayed.

Notable fauna associated with the island include African fish eagles, swifts, hippopotamus, and Nile crocodiles. About fifty impalas have been introduced to the island.

Located on the Lake Victoria, this island is a haven for birds. Covered mostly in grassland, Ndere Island provides beautiful scenic views of the Homa hills to the south, Mageta Island to the east and the glimpses of Kampala in Uganda beyond the south west horizon. The lake shore supports a wide variety of animals including hippos, monitor lizards, Nile crocodiles, several fish species, snakes, baboons, impalas, the rare sitatunga antelopes, water bucks, zebras and warthogs. Over 100 different species of birds can be seen here including African fish eagles, black headed gonoleks,Banded snake eagle, African Jacana, great egret, white browed coucal, african green pigeon, eastern grey plantain eater and grey headed kingfishers.
